= List of leisure and entertainment in Leatherhead =

There is a variety of places in Leatherhead, Surrey which are used for leisure and entertainment:

== Clubs and activities ==
- Bocketts Farm
- Cannons Health Club
- Leatherhead Army Cadet Force
- Leatherhead & Cobham Cricket Club
- Leatherhead F.C.
- Leatherhead Golf Club
- Leatherhead Leisure Centre
- Leatherhead Museum
- Odeon Cinemas (In Epsom)
- Miniature Railway Club
- Leatherhead Theatre (Formerly the Thorndike Theatre)
- Tyrrells Wood Golf Club
- Stoke d'Abernon Cricket Club

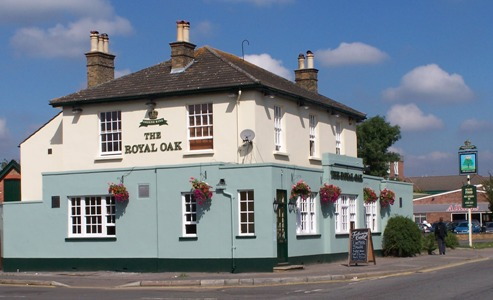
The Royal Oak, Kingston Road

== Pubs ==
- Duke's Head
- The Edmund Tilney
- The Penny Black
- The Plough
- The Royal Oak
- The Running Horse
- The Star (Surrey/Greater London County line runs through the bar.)

== Social clubs ==
- Constitutional Club (Former Conservative Club)
- Leatherhead and District Social Club, C&IU Affiliate.
- Leatherhead Royal British Legion Club, C&IU Affiliate.
- North Leatherhead Community Association (NLCA)

== Hotels ==
- Travelodge, in Leatherhead and Dorking
- Swan Lodge B&B
- Burford Bridge Hotel, historic hotel in Mickleham, where Lord Nelson spent his last hours with his love Emma Hamilton, before the Battle of Trafalgar
- Woodlands Park Hotel
