= River Mole LNR =

Nature reserve in Surrey, England

Coordinates: 51.292°N 0.338°W

River Mole
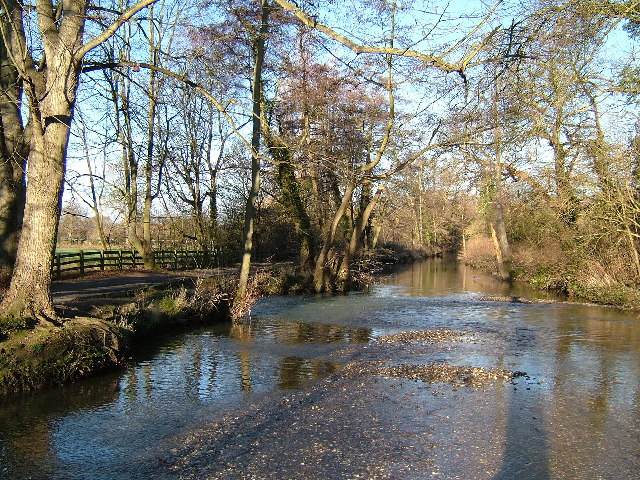
- Interactive map of River Mole
- Type: Local Nature Reserve
- Location: Leatherhead, Surrey
- OS grid: TQ 160 561
- Area: 23.3 hectares (58 acres)
- Manager: Environment Agency, Mole Valley District Council, Lower Mole Countryside Project, Leatherhead Trust, Surrey County Council and private landowners

River Mole LNR is a 23.3-hectare (58-acre) Local Nature Reserve in Leatherhead in Surrey. It is owned by private landowners and managed by the Environment Agency, Mole Valley District Council, Lower Mole Countryside Project, Leatherhead Trust, Surrey County Council and private landowners.

This site consists of two stretches of the River Mole and its banks, one in Leatherhead and the other north-west of the town. It has diverse fauna and flora.
