= St Andrew's Catholic School =

Location
- Grange Road; Leatherhead, Surrey, KT22 7JP; England; 51.3023°N 0.3156°W

Information
- Type: Voluntary aided comprehensive
- Motto: ‘Vivere, discere et amare in lumine Christi’ English: ‘To live to learn and to love in the light of christ’
- Religious affiliation: Roman Catholic
- Local authority: Surrey
- Department for Education URN: 125275 Tables
- Ofsted: Reports
- Chair: Maria Kiero-Watson
- Head teacher: Adam Brooks
- Staff: 121
- Gender: Mixed
- Age: 11 to 18
- Enrolment: 1452 pupils
- Houses: Romero (red), Parks (yellow), Theresa (blues), Kolbe (green)
- Colour: Yellow Blue
- Website: www.st-andrews.surrey.sch.uk

St Andrew's Catholic School is a Christian secondary school and sixth form college in Grange Road, Ottways Lane, Leatherhead, close to the town of Epsom, Surrey, England. Originally a convent back in the 19th century, St Andrews School was transformed into a school in 1901; it consists of three main buildings: the central building dating back to the 1900s, a sixth form and performance arts building, finished in 2008, and the Earl building which accommodates History, Geography and Languages, finished in 2017. Named in memory of John Earl who served as Chair of Governors.

The school is on the boundary of Leatherhead and Ashtead and is primarily a faith school, and has links with the local diocese and churches.

The school holds Specialist Maths and Computing College status and is one of the top 10 most popular schools in Surrey.

Due to growing demand, St Andrew's School has grown from 600 pupils in 2003 to 934 pupils in 2013 and to 1457 in 2020. The school is forecasted to continue to expand.

== Awards ==
As of 2022 St Andrew's is the Times newspaper's Comprehensive School of The Year.

This is in addition to St Andrew's being named a World Class school. One of only 34 in the country.

== Sixth Form ==
In 2003 the St Andrew's Sixth Form was small with only 39 students but has now grown to have a capacity of 300.

== History ==
=== 19th century ===
The school was originally founded as a convent in the 19th century.

=== 20th century ===
==== Second World War ====
During the Second World War, in the spring of 1941, St Andrew's Convent School was bombed and left badly damaged by a parachute mine. The nuns evacuated, turning the ruined building over to the country. This provided a training premises for the Surrey County Civil Defence and Rescue School (set up in 1940), and run by the founder Eric Claxton, to train for bringing bomb victims out of damaged buildings.

== Ofsted ==
Ofsted inspections gave the school a Satisfactory grade in 2007 and 2010. This improved to the school receiving an Ofsted result of Outstanding in 2012, which was maintained in an inspection in May 2024.

== School links ==
This school has close links to secondary schools such as Salesian School, a split-site Roman Catholic comprehensive secondary school in Chertsey, Surrey.

1. Winner of the Barbara Lee Cup for Operatic Aria - Redhill & Reigate Music Festival, May 2013
2. Winner of the Homer Cup (Song Recital) - Redhill & Reigate Music Festival, May 2013
