= Wesley House, Leatherhead =

Municipal building in Leatherhead, Surrey, England

Wesley House
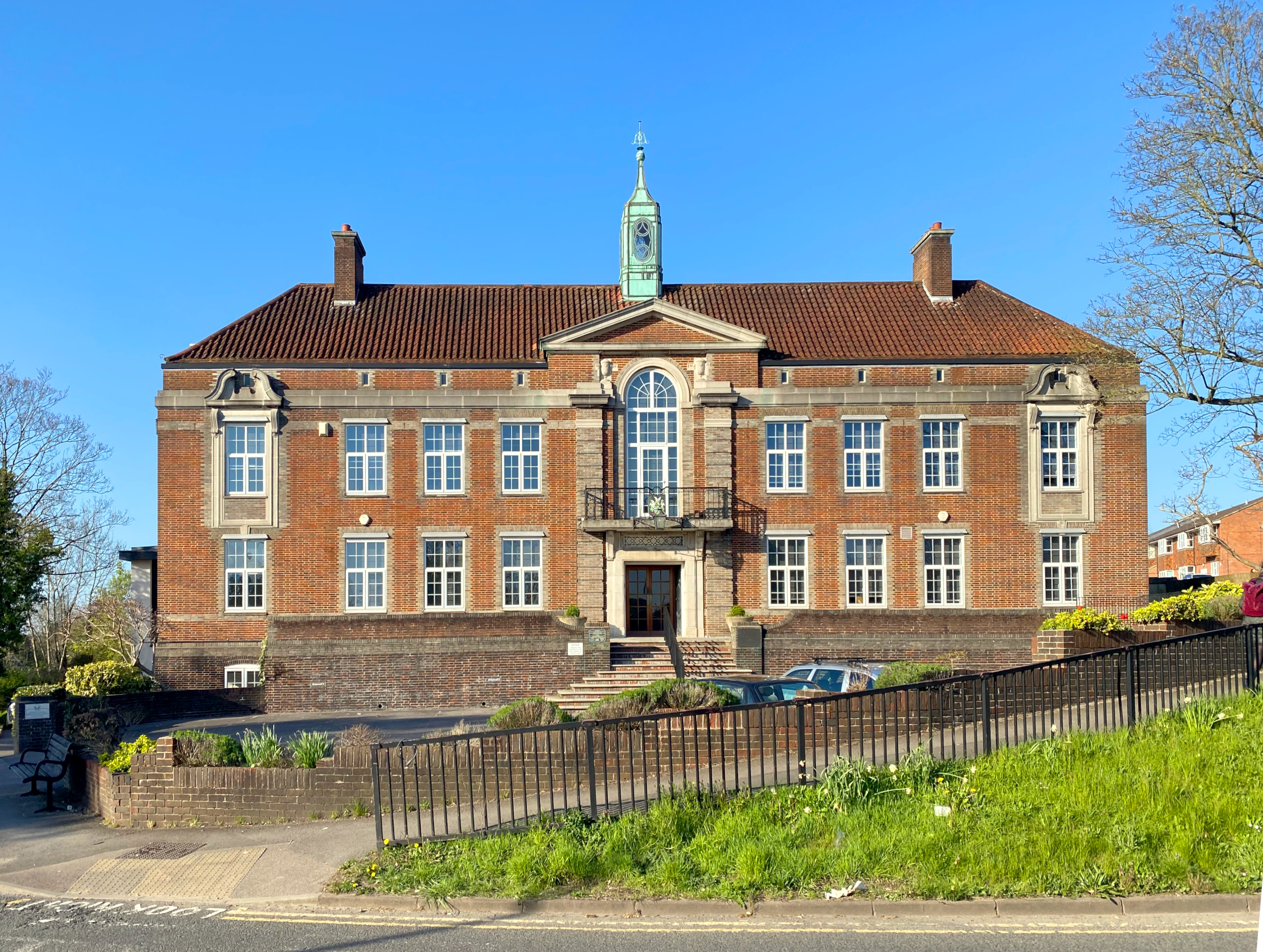
- Wesley House

- Shown in Surrey
- 51.2967°N 0.3308°W
- Location: Bull Hill, Leatherhead

History
- Built: 1935

Site notes
- Architect(s): C. H. Rose and H. R. Gardner
- Architectural style: Neoclassical style

Listed Building – Grade II
- Official name: Wesley House, with Steps and Walls to Front
- Designated: 6 April 1999
- Reference no.: 1113328

Wesley House, formerly the Council Offices, is a former municipal building on Bull Hill, Leatherhead, Surrey, England. The building, which was the headquarters of Leatherhead Urban District Council, is a Grade II listed building.

== History ==
Following significant population growth, largely associated with the development of family-based manufacturing firms, the area became an urban district in 1894. Civic leaders initially established themselves in offices in Church Street. However, as the responsibilities of local authorities increased, the council decided to procure purpose-built council offices: the site they selected on Bull Hill was occupied by an 18th-century building known as "Kingston House". (Note: Kingston House was a private dwelling which had been designed in the Queen Anne style and built in the 18th century. The house was the home of the Richard Belson who invited the Methodist theologian, John Wesley, to preach a sermon in the house on 23 February 1791.)

The works began with the demolition of Kingston House which took place in 1933. The new building was designed by C. Holland Rose and H. R. Gardner in the neoclassical style and built in red brick with stone dressings. At its official opening in May 1935, Viscount Wakefield unveiled a plaque to commemorate John Wesley's historic visit to Kingston House. The design involved a symmetrical main frontage with nine bays facing onto the corner of Bull Hill and Leret Way with the end bays featuring sash windows with swan-necked pediments on the first floor; the central bay featured a flight of steps leading up to a doorway with a stone surround and brackets supporting an entablature. On the first floor there was an iron balcony bearing the town's coat of arms and a prominent rounded headed French door flanked by full-height pilasters supporting a pediment. At roof level there was a copper flèche and a weather vane. Internally, the principal rooms were an entrance hall, which was decorated in an Art Deco style, and a semi-circular council chamber which jutted out to the rear of the building and featured fine wooden panelling.

The council offices continued to serve as the headquarters of Leatherhead Urban District Council for much of the 20th century and remained a meeting place for the enlarged Mole Valley District Council after it was formed in 1974. However, it ceased to be the local seat of government when the district council moved to modern offices at Dorking in 1983.

Renamed Wesley House to commemorate the connection with the Methodist theologian, the building was then occupied by the local Citizens Advice Bureau and by a security alarms business before being sold to a developer in December 1999. The developer refurbished the council chamber, converted the remainder of the building for commercial use and added a glass and steel west wing onto the complex.
