= Goblin Vacuum Cleaners =

British brand of vacuum cleaners

- Industry: Vacuum cleaner manufacturer
- Founded: 1926
- Fate: Acquired by RKW

Goblin Vacuum Cleaners was a British brand of vacuum cleaners made from the early 1900s until the early 2000s.

== History ==
In the early 1930s, Goblin vacuum cleaners were manufactured by the British Vacuum Cleaner and Engineering Co. Ltd. (BVC). The managing director was Hubert Cecil Booth who, the company claimed, had invented the vacuum cleaner in about 1900, although it was subsequently copied in the USA and elsewhere.

The Court Circular for 25 October 1902 recorded that Booth had shown the king and queen the vacuum cleaning process at Buckingham Palace, and that as a result of this, BVC vacuum cleaners were installed there and at many other royal palaces throughout Europe. By the 1930s, many public buildings were equipped with forty or more centralised vacuum cleaners using a common extraction system. These centralised systems consisted of an air exhauster, a dust filter (with detachable dust container), and wrought iron pipes run through the building, to which flexible hoses could be fitted for use in individual rooms. Important users included the Houses of Parliament, Imperial Chemical House, the Bank of England, and the headquarters of the State Savings Bank in Victoria, Australia.

Goblin was the trade name of the company's domestic cleaners. Their industrial cleaning systems using similar technology were used in power stations and factories, and include chimney cleaning devices, in Birmingham, Edinburgh, Calcutta, Barcelona, Shanghai and in HM Dockyards worldwide. The company also made washing machines and Teasmade automatic tea-making machines. By 1947 they had a large factory – previously an artificial silk works – at Ermyn Way, Ashtead, near Leatherhead in Surrey.

From the 1970s, Goblin became a well-known budget domestic brand. Whilst Hoover and Electrolux dominated the top end of the British vacuum cleaner market, Goblin continued to sell large numbers of cheaper cleaners. Popular models included the 1970s "Housemaid" cleaner (with an advertising campaign featuring Jenny Tomasin of Upstairs, Downstairs fame) and the compact "Rio" cleaner of the 1980s. In the early 1980s the company changed its name to BVC, British Vacuum Cleaners, though the new name never stuck with staff and locals. In 1984 the company decided to cease operations at the Leatherhead plant and move to Gosport, Hampshire, and its former site was redeveloped as a headquarters for Esso (now ExxonMobil).

In 1973, Goblin was bought by Birmingham Sound Reproducers (BSR), alongside their Swan Brand subsidiary. BSR sold Goblin to American company Shop-Vac in 1984, who sold their European business – including a vacuum cleaner plant at Tralee, Ireland – to Glen Dimplex in 1998. Glen Dimplex, who also manufactured Morphy Richards vacuum cleaners and other small appliances, continued to manufacture Goblin vacuum cleaners until the mid-2000s. Most of these were budget cylinder models similar to their Morphy Richards cleaners but with lesser build quality and fewer features. From the mid-2000s, the Goblin name was phased out in favour of the Morphy Richards brand.

British Vacuum Cleaners continued as a maker of industrial vacuum cleaners and central vacuum cleaning systems. By 2006 it was part of the South African Barloworld conglomerate. BVC and Lamson were bought by Quirepace, who continue to produce BVC cleaners from their site at Fareham, Hampshire.

As of 2020, the brand has been revived and is used for floorcare products sold at Asda.

In 2023, RKW acquired Goblin from Glen Electric.
