= Harold Auten =

Royal Naval Reserve officer

Commander Harold Auten VC DSC RD
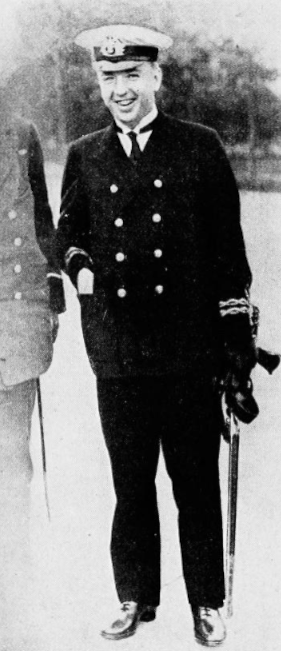
- Born: 22 August 1891; Leatherhead, Surrey, England
- Died: 3 October 1964 (aged 73); Bushkill, Pennsylvania, US
- Burial place: Sandhill Cemetery, Bushkill
- Military career
- Allegiance: United Kingdom
- Branch: Royal Navy
- Service years: 1910–1945
- Rank: Commander
- Conflicts: First World War: Naval campaign; English Channel campaign; Second World War: Atlantic War; Atlantic convoys
- Awards: Victoria Cross; Distinguished Service Cross; Decoration for Officers of the Royal Naval Reserve; Legion of Merit (United States); Order of Orange-Nassau (Netherlands)
- Other work: Movie executive

Commander Harold Auten (22 August 1891 – 3 October 1964) was a Royal Naval Reserve (RNR) officer who was awarded the Victoria Cross, the highest award for gallantry in the face of the enemy that can be awarded to British and Commonwealth forces. He received his medal for an action during the English Channel campaign of the First World War.

A former pupil of Wilson's School, Wallington, London, Auten had joined the RNR before the outbreak of the First World War during which he served in Q-ships. He was promoted to lieutenant in 1917, and was awarded the Distinguished Service Cross "for services in Vessels of the Royal Navy employed on Patrol and Escort duty" in that year.

== Citation ==
He was awarded the Victoria Cross in 1918 following an action when he was commanding a Q-ship, HMS Stock Force:

H.M.S. "Stock Force," under the command of Lieutenant Harold Auten, D.S.C., R.N.R., was torpedoed by an enemy submarine at 5 p.m. on the 30th July, 1918. The torpedo struck the ship abreast No. 1 hatch, entirely wrecking the fore part of the ship, including the bridge, and wounding three ratings. A tremendous shower of planks, unexploded shells, hatches and other debris followed the explosion, wounding the first lieutenant (Lieutenant E.J. Grey, R.N.R.) and the navigating officer (Lieutenant L.E. Workman, R.N.R.) and adding to the injuries of the foremost gun's crew and a number of other ratings. The ship settled down forward, flooding the foremost magazine and between decks to the depth of about three feet. "Panic party," in charge of Lieutenant Workman, R.N.R., immediately abandoned ship, and the wounded were removed to the lower deck, where the surgeon (Surgeon Probationer G.E. Strahan, R.N.V.R.), working up to his waist in water, attended to their injuries. The captain, two guns' crews and the engine-room staff remained at their posts.

The submarine then came to the surface ahead of the ship half a mile distant, and remained there a quarter of an hour, apparently watching the ship for any doubtful movement.

The "panic party" in the boat accordingly commenced to row back towards the ship in an endeavour to decoy the submarine within range of the hidden guns. The submarine (SM UB-80) followed, coming slowly down the port side of the "Stock Force," about three hundred yards away. Lieutenant Auten, however, withheld his fire until she was abeam, when both of his guns could bear. Fire was opened at 5.40 p.m.; the first shot carried away one of the periscopes, the second round hit the conning tower, blowing it away and throwing the occupant high into the air. The next round struck the submarine on the water-line, tearing her open and blowing out a number of the crew.

The enemy then subsided several feet into the water and her bows rose. She thus presented a large and immobile target into which the "Stock Force" poured shell after shell until the submarine sank by the stern, leaving a quantity of debris on the water. During the whole of the action one man (Officer's Steward, 2nd Class, R.J. Starling) remained pinned down under the foremost gun after the explosion of the torpedo, and remained there cheerfully and without complaint, although the ship was apparently sinking, until the end of the action.

The "Stock Force" was a vessel of 360 tons, and despite the severity of the shock sustained by the officers and men when she was torpedoed, and the fact that her bows were almost obliterated, she was kept afloat by the exertions of her ship's company until 9.25 p.m. She then sank with colours flying, and the officers and men were taken off by two torpedo boats and a trawler.

The action was cited as one of the finest examples of coolness, discipline and good organisation in the history of "Q" ships.

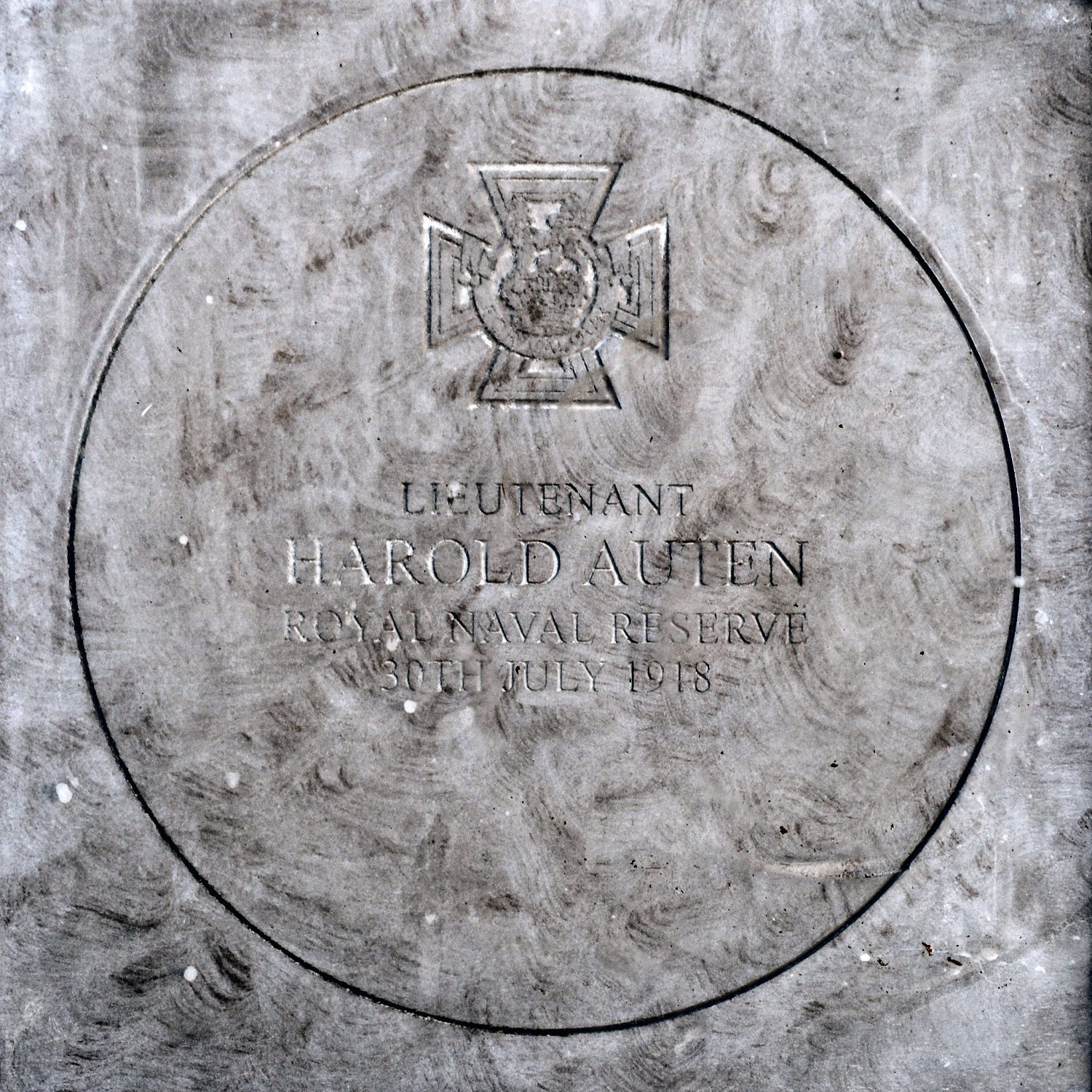
Commemorative stone, Leatherhead

(Note: the "panic party" was a group of the crew who would pretend to "abandon ship" when a Q-ship was attacked.)

Auten's Victoria Cross is on display at the Royal Naval Museum, in Portsmouth, England.

== Later work ==
Harold Auten wrote Q Boat Adventures, the first book on Q-ships in 1919.

After the war he became an executive vice-president of the Rank Organisation in New York and lived for thirty years in Bushkill, Pennsylvania, where he owned a hotel and cinema. However, he remained a member of the RNR and in 1941 he was awarded the Royal Naval Reserve Officers Decoration.

During World War II, he held the rank of Commander (later acting Captain) in the RNR and served as senior staff organizing trans-Atlantic convoys. He was made an Officer of the United States Legion of Merit "for distinguished service to the Allied cause throughout the war" and a Commander of the Order of Orange-Nassau "for service to the Royal Netherlands Navy during the War". He was a Younger Brother of Trinity House.
