= Bocketts Farm =

Demonstration farm in Surrey, England

Coordinates: 51°16′55″N 0°20′35″W

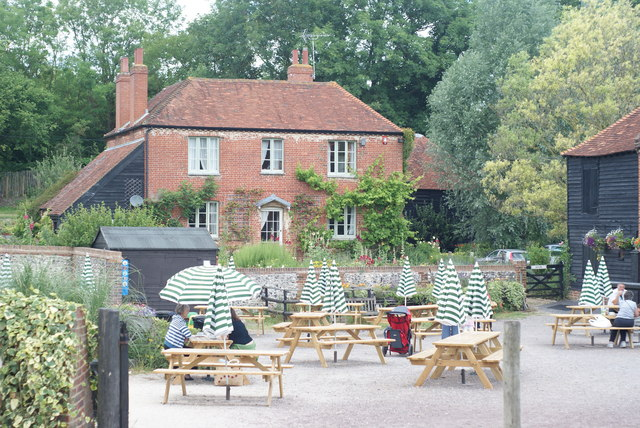
Bocketts Farm

Bocketts Farm in Surrey, England is a visitor attraction farm set in the countryside on the slopes of the North Downs 1.6 miles (2.6 km) due south of Leatherhead.

== Facilities ==
Animals on the farm include lambs, piglets, goat kids, chicks and ducklings. The farm also trades as a visitor attraction with approximately 50,000 visits per year, centred on children's educational visits by having extensive play areas and facilities for children of all ages. Inside are two 'playbarns' with a 70 ft 4-lane astroslide, trampolines and rides on tractors. Outside are adventure trails, a giant slide tower and a jumping pillow. The farm also has an 18th-century barn converted into a cafeteria.

== Operational and environmental context ==
The land which the business and its hedgerow and narrow wooded buffer zones occupy is one of three let farms of Norbury Park, an estate of 520 hectares (1,300 acres) within the Surrey Hills AONB (Area of Outstanding Natural Beauty). The estate is west of the Mole Gap part of the River Mole and the A24 between Westhumble and the borders of Leatherhead, Fetcham and Great Bookham which also has Metropolitan Green Belt status, and is within 3 miles (4.8 km) of the M25 London Orbital Motorway.
