= The Running Horse =

Pub in Leatherhead, Surrey, England

Coordinates: 51.295°N 0.331°W

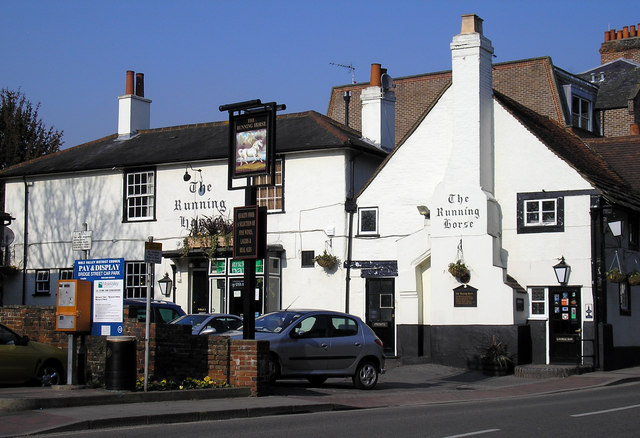
The Running Horse

The Running Horse is a Grade II* listed pub in the town of Leatherhead, Surrey, England. Dating back to 1403, on the bank of the River Mole, the Running Horse is located in one of the oldest buildings in Leatherhead.

== History ==
Built in the 15th century on land belonging to the church, The Running Horse was originally known as Rummings House, after Eleynor Rumminge who was written about by Henry VIII's poet John Skelton. The poem can be found on a wall in the pub.

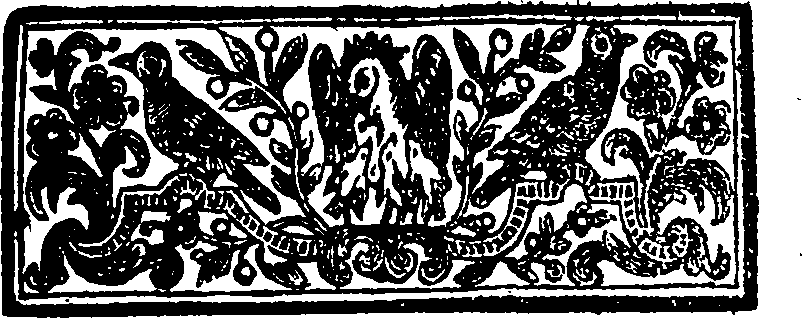
The tunning of Elinor Rumming a poem. Fleuron from 1718 edition.

The composer Ralph Vaughan Williams, who spent his childhood at nearby Leith Hill, set Skelton's poem, and The Tunning of Elinor Rumming was one of his Five Tudor Portraits (1935).
