= Box Hill, Surrey =

Hill and beauty spot in Surrey, England

Box Hill
- Part of the Mole Gap to Reigate Escarpment SSSI
- IUCN category IV (habitat/species management area)
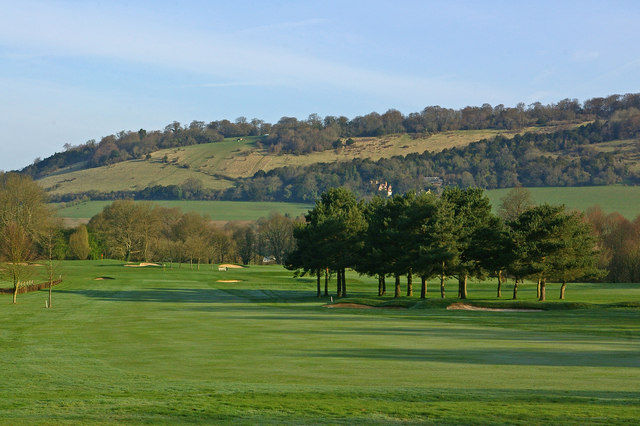
- Box Hill viewed from the south. Photograph taken from Betchworth Park Golf Course.

- Location within Surrey
- Nearest town: Dorking, Surrey, England
- Coordinates: 51°15′18″N 0°18′31″W
- Area: 11 km^{2} (4.2 sq mi)
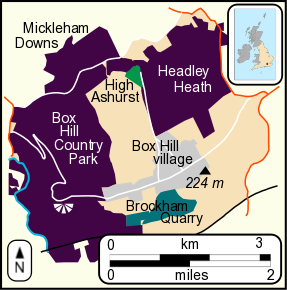
- Map of Box Hill, showing the areas managed by the National Trust (purple), Surrey Wildlife Trust (turquoise) and Surrey County Council (green). The urban area of Box Hill village is shown in grey.

Highest point
- Elevation: 224 m (735 ft)
- Prominence: 49 m (161 ft)

Geography
- Parent range: North Downs
- OS grid: TQ 178 514
- Topo map: OS Landranger 187

Geology
- Rock age(s): Cretaceous and Eocene
- Mountain type: Cuesta
- Rock types: Chalk; Clay-with-Flints

Box Hill is a summit of the North Downs in Surrey, approximately 31 km (19 mi) south-west of London. It is named after the ancient box woodland found on the steepest west-facing chalk slopes overlooking the River Mole. The western part of the hill is owned and managed by the National Trust, whilst the village of Box Hill lies on higher ground to the east. The highest point is Betchworth Clump at 224 m (735 ft) above OD, although the Salomons Memorial (at 172 metres) overlooking the town of Dorking is the most popular viewpoint.

Box Hill is part of the Surrey Hills National Landscape and forms part of the Mole Gap to Reigate Escarpment Site of Special Scientific Interest. The north- and south-facing slopes support an area of chalk downland, noted for its orchids and other rare plant species. The hill provides a habitat for 38 species of butterfly, and has given its name to a species of squash bug, now found throughout south-east England.

An estimated 850,000 people visit Box Hill each year. The National Trust visitors' centre provides both a cafeteria and gift shop, and panoramic views of the western Weald may be enjoyed from the North Downs Way, a long-distance footpath that runs along the south-facing scarp slope. Box Hill featured prominently on the route of the 2012 Summer Olympics cycling road race events.

== Geography ==
Box Hill, approximately 31 km (19 mi) south-west of central London, stands at the south-eastern corner of the Mole Gap, the valley carved by the River Mole through the North Downs. Its summit, 224 metres (735 ft) above Ordnance Datum, is the 12th highest in Surrey. The western boundary of the hill is defined by the River Mole, which has cut a steep cliff, exposing the chalk bedrock. The Vale of Holmesdale lies immediately to the south, below the scarp slope. The northern and eastern boundaries are defined by dry river valleys, which were created during the last Ice Age. The total area of the hill is approximately 11 square kilometres (4.2 sq mi), of which half is owned by the National Trust.

== The village ==
Box Hill
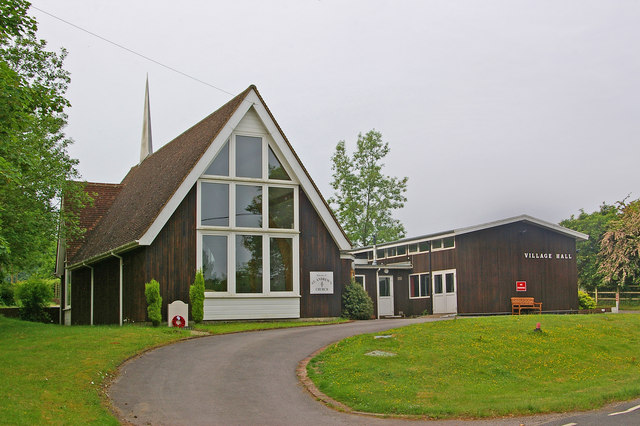
- St Andrew's Church, Box Hill village
- Population: 1,320 (2019 estimate)
- Civil parish: n/a
- District: Mole Valley
- Shire county: Surrey
- Region: South East
- Country: England
- Sovereign state: United Kingdom
- Post town: Tadworth
- Postcode district: KT20
- Dialling code: 01306 / 01737
- Police: Surrey
- Fire: Surrey
- Ambulance: South East Coast
- UK Parliament: Dorking and Horley

The village of Box Hill is to the east of the summit and to the west of the Country Park owned by the National Trust. The earliest flint cottages date from the 1800s, although much of the village was constructed in the first half of the 20th century. By 2005 there were more than 800 dwellings, of which over five hundred were mobile homes. An estimated 41% of the community is aged 60 or over. St Andrew's Church, part of the ecclesiastical parish of Headley, was consecrated in 1969 and the village hall opened in 1974. The village is not part of a civil parish.

== History ==
=== Early history ===
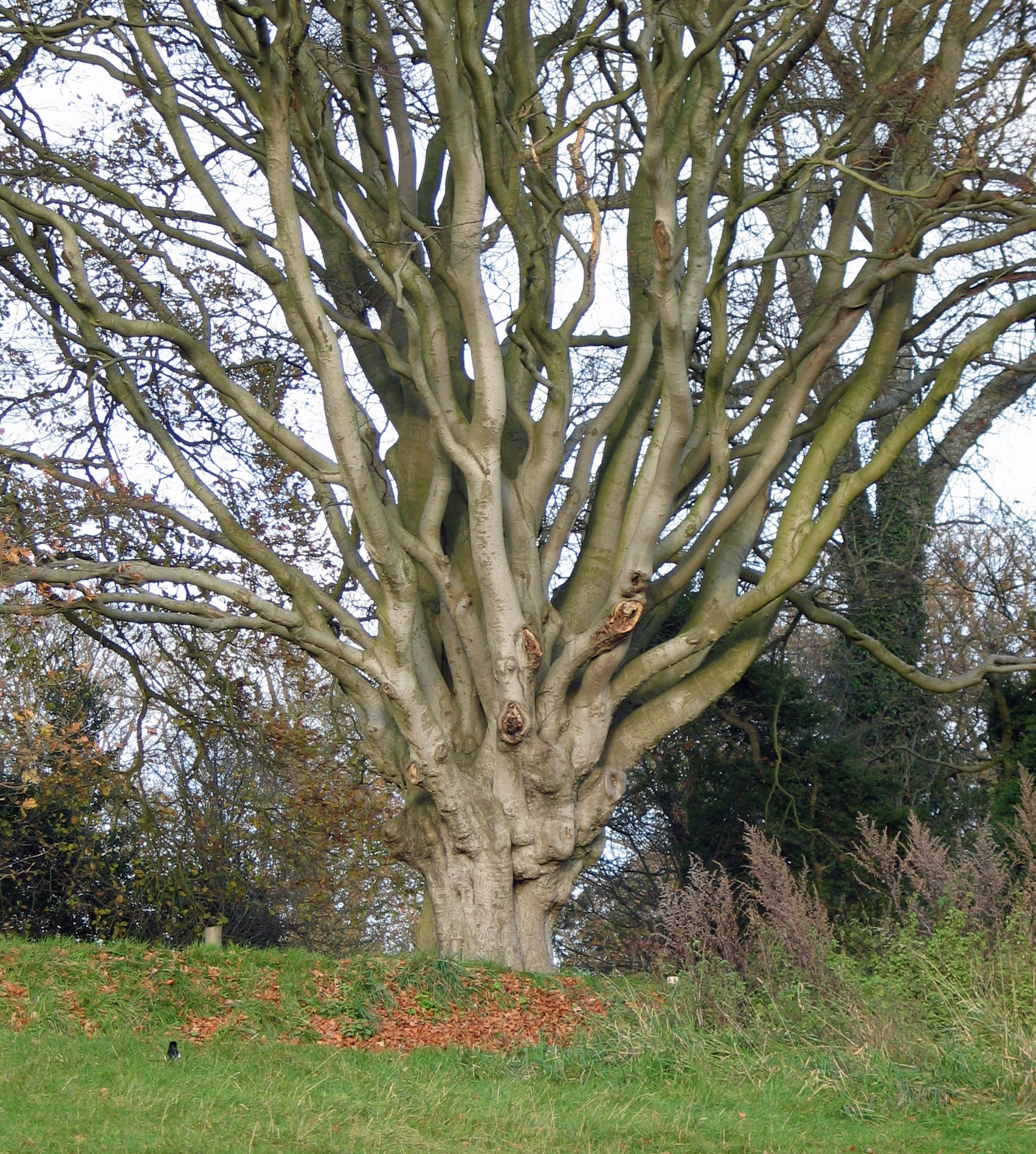
Ancient pollarded beech tree between the Viewpoint and the Donkey Green. (Note: The tree marks the boundary between two parishes: Mickleham (to the north) and Dorking (to the south).)

Two Bronze Age round barrows, located close to the Salomons Memorial, provide the earliest archaeological evidence of human activity on Box Hill. The larger barrow is 20 m (66 ft) in diameter and 2.2 m (7 ft 3 in) high and, in medieval times, was used as a boundary marker or mere for the parish of Mickleham. Traces of prehistoric field boundaries are visible on Burford Spur and the low flint banks on the steeper and more wooded White Hill may be contemporaneous.

An ancient trackway along the North Downs escarpment can be dated to around 600–450 BC, but has probably been in existence since the Stone Age and may have crossed the River Mole at a ford close to the location of the present day stepping stones. In Victorian times this route was dubbed the Pilgrims' Way and was supposedly followed by visitors to the shrines of Thomas Becket and Swithun at Canterbury and Winchester respectively.

Stane Street was constructed by the Romans in around 60–70 AD to link London (Londinium) to Chichester (Noviomagus Reginorum) on the south coast of England. The course of the road runs in a southwesterly direction across Mickleham Downs, before turning south to cross the River Mole at a ford close to the site of the Burford Bridge Hotel. A hoard of nine Roman coins, including bronze folles dating from the reigns of Diocletian, Maximian and Constantius I, was discovered on Box Hill close to Broadwood's Folly in 1979.

=== Medieval and early modern periods ===
The pillow mounds to the north-east of the Salomons Memorial are thought to date from the medieval period and were probably constructed as artificial warrens for rabbits. High Ashurst warren is recorded as remaining in use until the late 18th century. A second warren was probably situated close to Warren Farm in the Headley Valley and it has been speculated that the present farmhouse was originally the warrener's cottage.

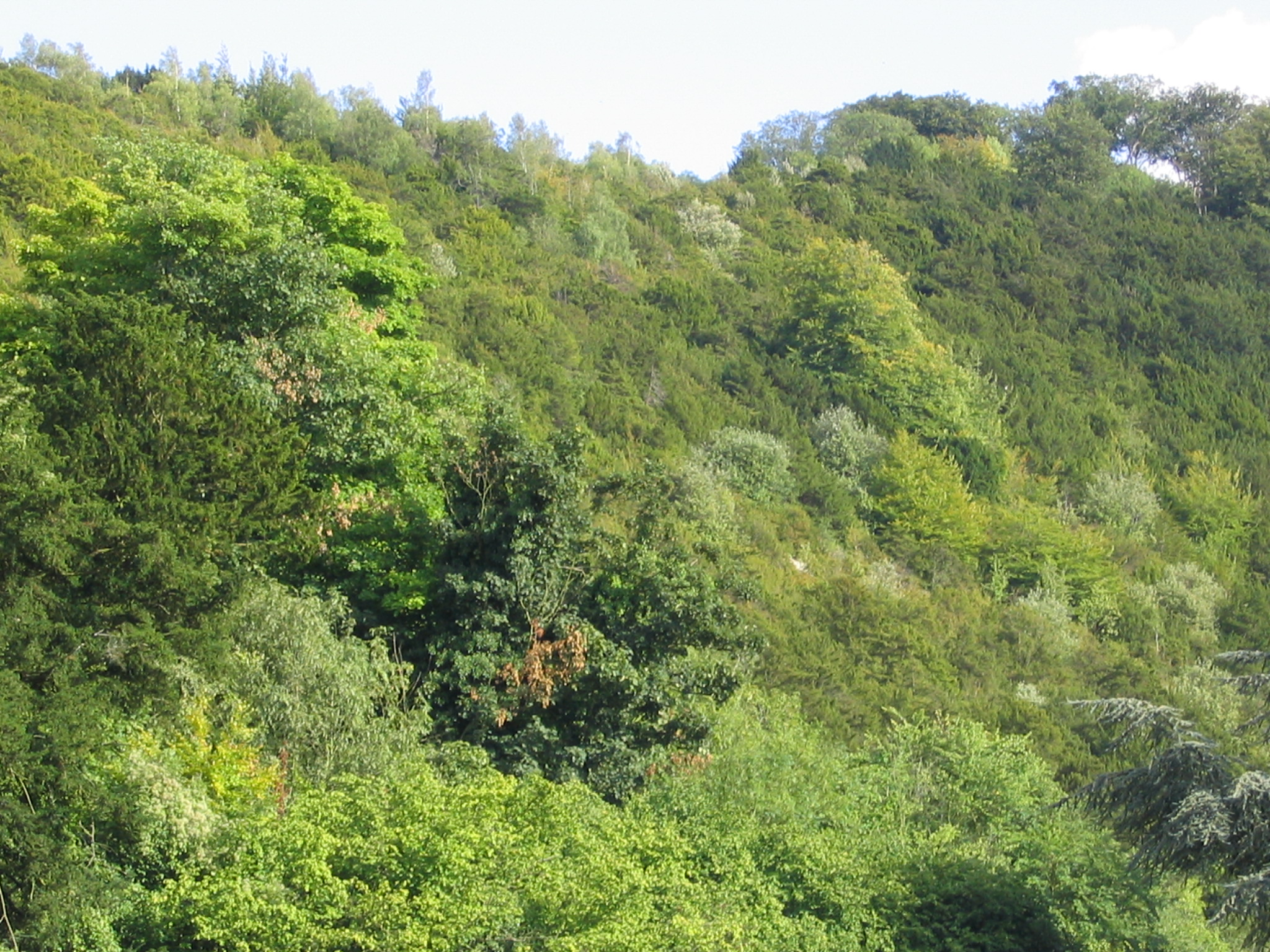
Box and yew trees growing on the steep, western slope of Box Hill, above the River Mole.

The origin of the box trees growing on the hill is disputed. Several sources from the late 18th century suggest that they were planted by Thomas Howard, 21st Earl of Arundel during the reign of Charles I. However Howard never owned the Box Hill estate and older medieval documents make reference to local individuals with surnames including Atteboxe, de la Boxe and Buxeto, suggesting that the trees were already common in the area by the 13th century. The diarist John Evelyn records a visit to the hill in August 1655 to view "those natural bowers, cabinets and shady walks in the box copses".

The close grain of the box wood made it highly prized for its timber for carving and there are numerous accounts of the sale of trees from the hill throughout the 17th and 18th centuries. At the end of the eighteenth century, imports from Portugal reduced the market value of box wood and commercial exploitation of timber from Box Hill appears to have ended with a final sale in 1797.

=== Agriculture ===
Despite the commercial importance of timber in the early modern period, the woodland on Box Hill was much less extensive at the start of the 19th century than at the start of the 21st. The 1801 Betchworth Estate Map shows that there was a network of irregularly shaped fields on the top of the hill, where the more fertile clay-with-flints overlays the chalk. These ‘clearings’ (each up to 1 hectare (2.5 acres)) were cultivated for arable crops, but by the 1830s changes in farming practices meant that they were too small to be worked economically and many were over-planted with beech (with some oak). These deciduous plantations may be distinguished from older yew- and box-dominated woodland on the hill by the uniform age of the trees.

Remnants of a few of these arable fields still exist, notably at the head of Juniper Bottom and around the old Box Hill Fort and Swiss Cottage. The Donkey Green (immediately north of the Salomons Memorial) was used as a cricket ground in the 1850s. It acquired its current name in Edwardian times, when donkey rides were offered to younger day trippers, although this practice had ceased by World War II.

The soil covering the north- and south-facing chalk slopes of the hill is too thin and insufficiently fertile to allow cultivation. These areas are indicated as sheep-walk on the 1801 map and were used as pasture, especially during the winter months when lower ground was too wet for productive grazing. Grazing of these slopes has continued into the 21st century and a herd of Belted Galloway cattle is used by both Surrey Wildlife Trust and the National Trust to control growth of grasses, thereby allowing wild flowers (including orchids) to flourish.

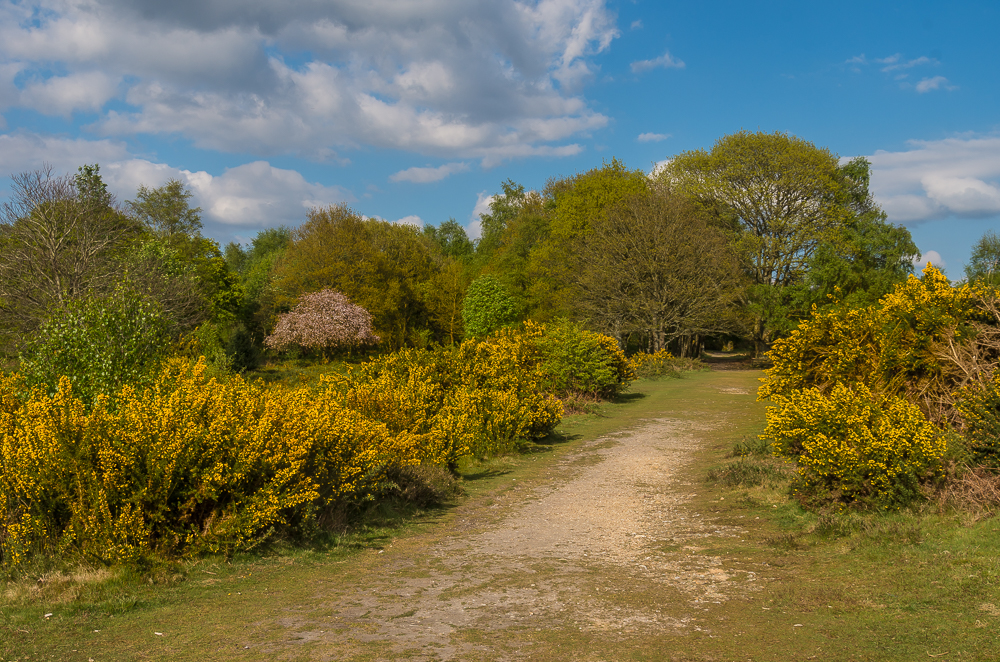
Common gorse in bloom on Headley Heath.

Throughout its history, Headley Heath has been used for grazing and local villagers have collected heather, gorse and turf for bedding and making fires. Although most Rights of Common connected with the heath were abolished by Act of Parliament in 1965, the inhabitants of one nearby cottage still have the right to graze geese.

=== Ownership and public access ===
The hill was purchased by Thomas Hope, shortly before his death in 1831. (Hope was the owner of The Deepdene, the mansion to the east of Dorking.) The Mickleham Parish Records credit Hope's widow, Louisa de la Poer Beresford (whom he had married six years previously), with allowing "free access to the beauties of this hill", however day-trippers had been arriving in significant numbers for more than a century before that.

Developments in local transport infrastructure over the course of the 18th and 19th centuries, enabled increasing numbers to visit the area. Following the completion of the turnpike road between Leatherhead and Dorking in 1750, stagecoaches stopped regularly at the Burford Bridge Hotel. As late as 1879, a daily coach ran non-stop to Box Hill from Piccadilly with a journey time of 2.5 hours. (Note: In March 1879 the coach left Piccadilly at 10:30am every day, arriving at the Burford Bridge Hotel at 1pm. The return journey left Box Hill at 4pm, arriving back in London at 6:30pm.)

The South Eastern Railway opened the first railway station in Dorking in 1849, followed by the London, Brighton and South Coast Railway (LBSCR), which opened the station in the village of Westhumble in 1867. The LBSCR ran dedicated excursion trains to Box Hill on Bank Holiday weekends and over 1300 day-trippers were recorded arriving at Westhumble station on 6 August 1883.

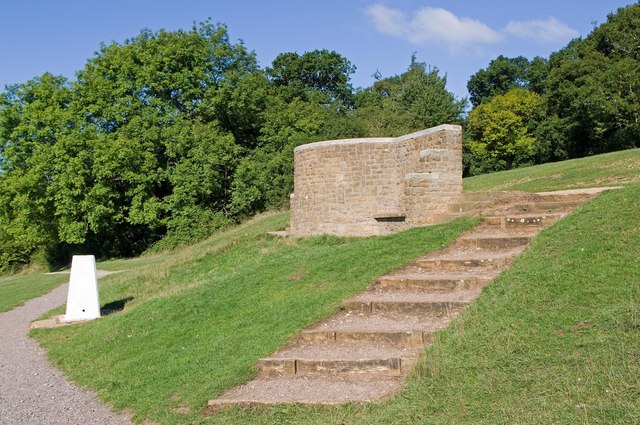
The Salomons Memorial commemorates the gift of 95 ha (230 acres) of land on Box Hill to the National Trust in 1914. (Note: Salomons died in September 1915, just over a year after donating the land on Box Hill to the National Trust. His widow opened the Memorial at the viewpoint in August 1920.)

The proposals for a land value tax outlined by Chancellor David Lloyd George in his People's Budget of 1909 prompted the trustees of the Deepdene estate to start to sell the unimproved land on the western side of Box Hill. As a result of negotiations led by Sir Robert Hunter, Leopold Salomons of Norbury Park purchased 95 ha (230 acres) of Box Hill in 1913 for £16,000. The following year, Salomons donated the land, which included the Old Fort, Swiss Cottage and the western flank of the hill above the River Mole, to the National Trust.

Two further purchases of 28 ha (69 acres) and 102 ha (250 acres) transferred Lodge Hill and Ashurst Rough to National Trust ownership in 1921 and 1923. Following World War II, National Trust acquired Headley Heath, a geologically distinct area of heathland which lies to the north-east of Box Hill village, the majority of which was given as a single donation in 1946. (Note: In 1946 Mr and Mrs Crookenden gave 195 hectares (480 acres) of Headley Heath (and the Lordship of the Manor of Headley) to the National Trust. The family of Lady Warburg donated the 9-hectare (22-acre) Heath Plantation following her death in 1952.) The Trust continued to purchase land, and by the mid-1980s the estate comprised some 500 ha (1,200 acres). The most recent additions to the Box Hill Estate include farmland at Westhumble and at the foot of the hill, purchased in the late 1990s.

=== Military history ===
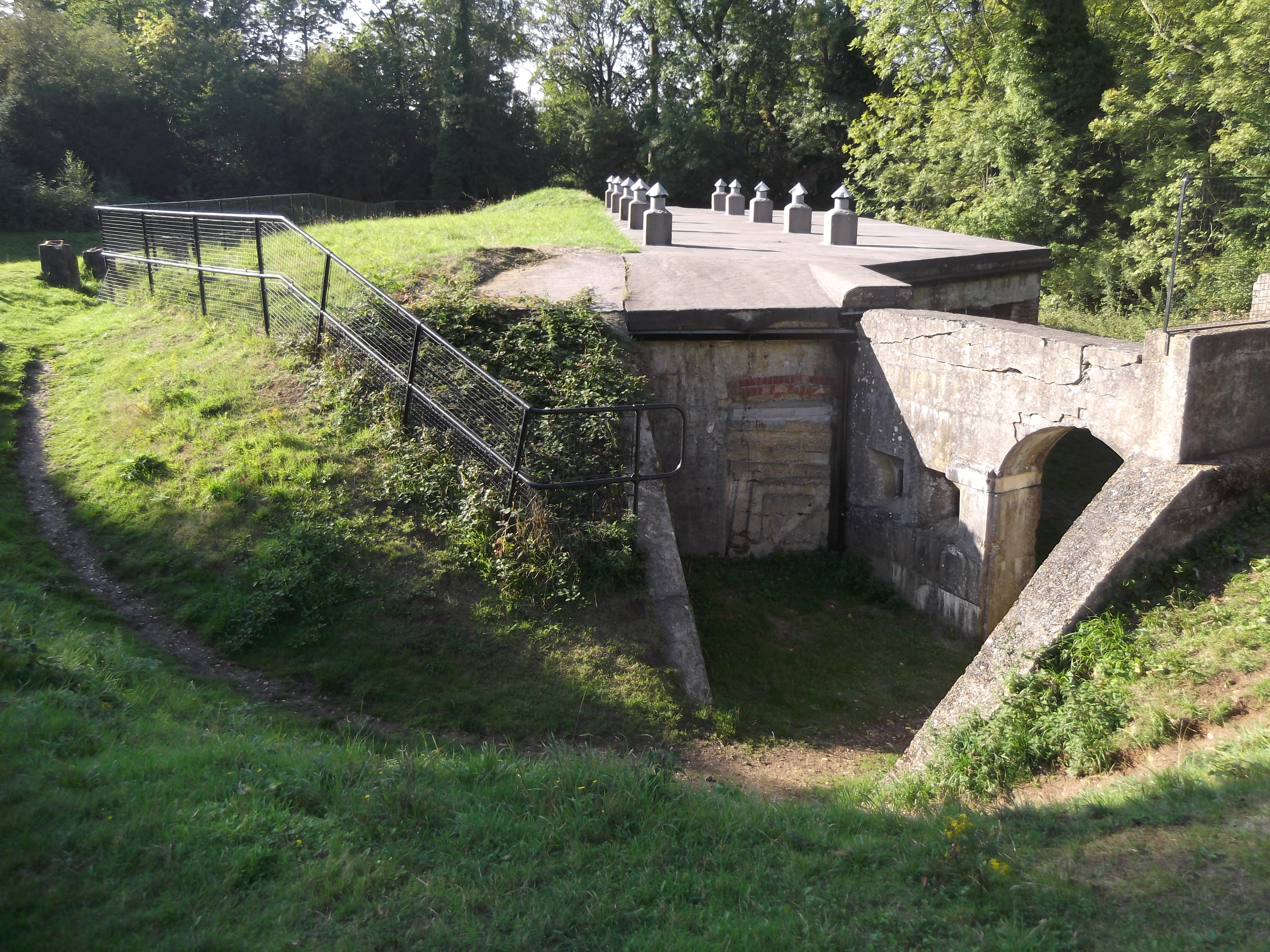
Box Hill Fort, constructed in 1899. Note the earth blast bank (left) which protects the south west face of the flat-roofed main building (right).

In the latter half of the 19th century, growing public concern over the ability of the British armed forces to repel an invasion (stoked, in part, by the serialisation of George Tomkyns Chesney's 1871 novella The Battle of Dorking), prompted the government to announce the construction of thirteen fortified mobilisation centres, collectively known as the London Defence Positions. (Note: A common misconception is that the forts were built to protect against invasion by the French Emperor Napoleon, however he had died in 1821, almost 80 years before construction began. The aftermath of the Franco-Prussian War of 1870 (which led to the unification of Germany), the reform of the Russian Army following the Crimean War and colonial disputes with France, prompted British fears of a war against an alliance of the main European powers. Lobbying by Sir Edward Hamley MP resulted in the Secretary of State for War, Edward Stanhope, presenting the bill for construction of the London Defence Positions to Parliament in 1889.) Two centres were built on Box Hill, approximately 2.5 km (1.6 mi) apart: one close to the present National Trust visitor centre (commonly called Box Hill Fort) (Note: The bridle path that leads from the bottom of the Burford Spur to the National Trust café, is generally known as the ‘Old Military Road’. Although it is mistakenly believed to have been constructed at the same time as Box Hill Fort, it is visible on the 1869 Ordnance survey map and may pre-date the Zig Zag Road.) and the other close to the summit of the hill, to the south of the present day Box Hill village (known as Betchworth Fort).

The sites were purchased from the trustees of the Hope estate by the Ministry of Defence in 1891, and construction began in 1899. The two centres were laid out in the form of infantry redoubts typical of the period, but also included magazines (partially below ground level) for the storage of shells and cartridges. (In common with the majority of the eleven other mobilisation centres, the forts were designed for the use of the infantry only and the stored ammunition was intended for the use of mobile field artillery which would be deployed nearby as required.) The main flat-roofed buildings were built in brick and reinforced concrete and were protected from artillery fire by crescent-shaped earth blast banks, surrounded by an outer ditch.

A reform of defence policy by the Secretary of War Viscount Haldane in 1905 resulted in all 13 centres being declared redundant, and both forts were sold back to the estate trustees in 1908. Both forts are protected by a Scheduled Monument listing. The National Trust owns the Box Hill Fort and a metal grill has been placed over the entrance to allow bats to access to their roosts. The Betchworth Fort is in private ownership and is not accessible to the public.

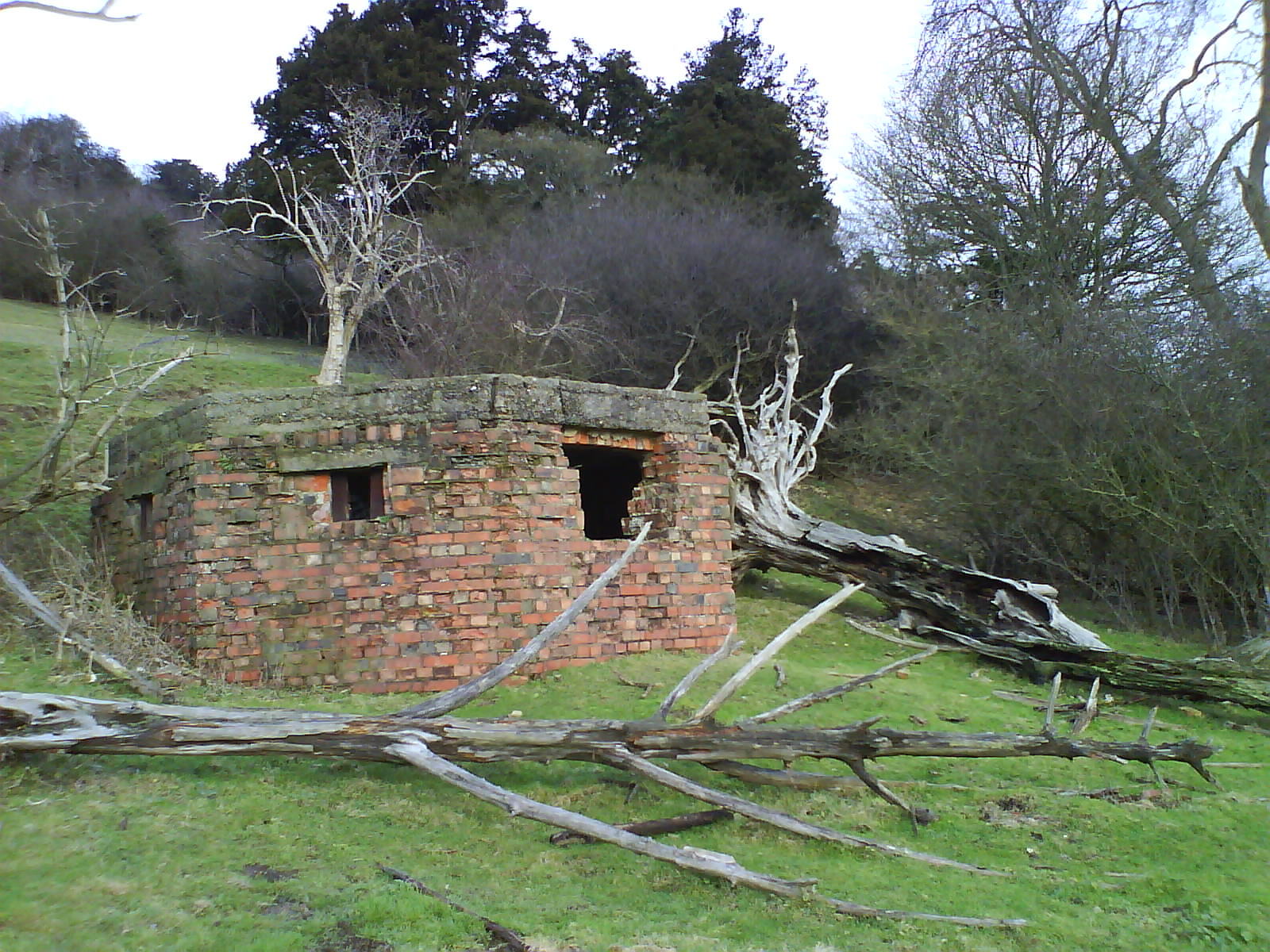
Pillbox on the south-facing scarp slope of Box Hill (to the north of Betchworth Castle).

During World War II, the River Mole comprised part of the fortified GHQ Line B. This defensive line ran along the North Downs from Farnham via Guildford to Dorking, before following the river to Horley. Between Betchworth and Box Hill, the north bank of the River Mole was stabilised and made steeper to prevent wheeled vehicles from crossing. At Boxhill Farm, where access to the river from the north bank was required for the herd of dairy cows, a row of twelve concrete cylinders were cast as an anti-tank measure. Gun mounts were also installed to protect both Boxhill and Deepdene bridges and several pillboxes were constructed. The Stepping Stones at the foot of the hill were removed as an anti-invasion measure.

From 1940, Headley Court was used as the Headquarters for the VII Corps and later for the Canadian Corps and Canadian troops were billeted at High Ashurst. Bellasis House was used as training centre both for Czech agents of the Special Operations Executive and for German Prisoners of War. In preparation for D-Day, Headley Heath was used for tank and combat training by the Canadian armed forces, and the area known as The Pyramids is named after the piles of ammunition that they kept on the heath. Betchworth Quarry was used by the British Army in early 1944, to test the firing capabilities of Churchill tanks.

== Geology ==
=== Rock types ===
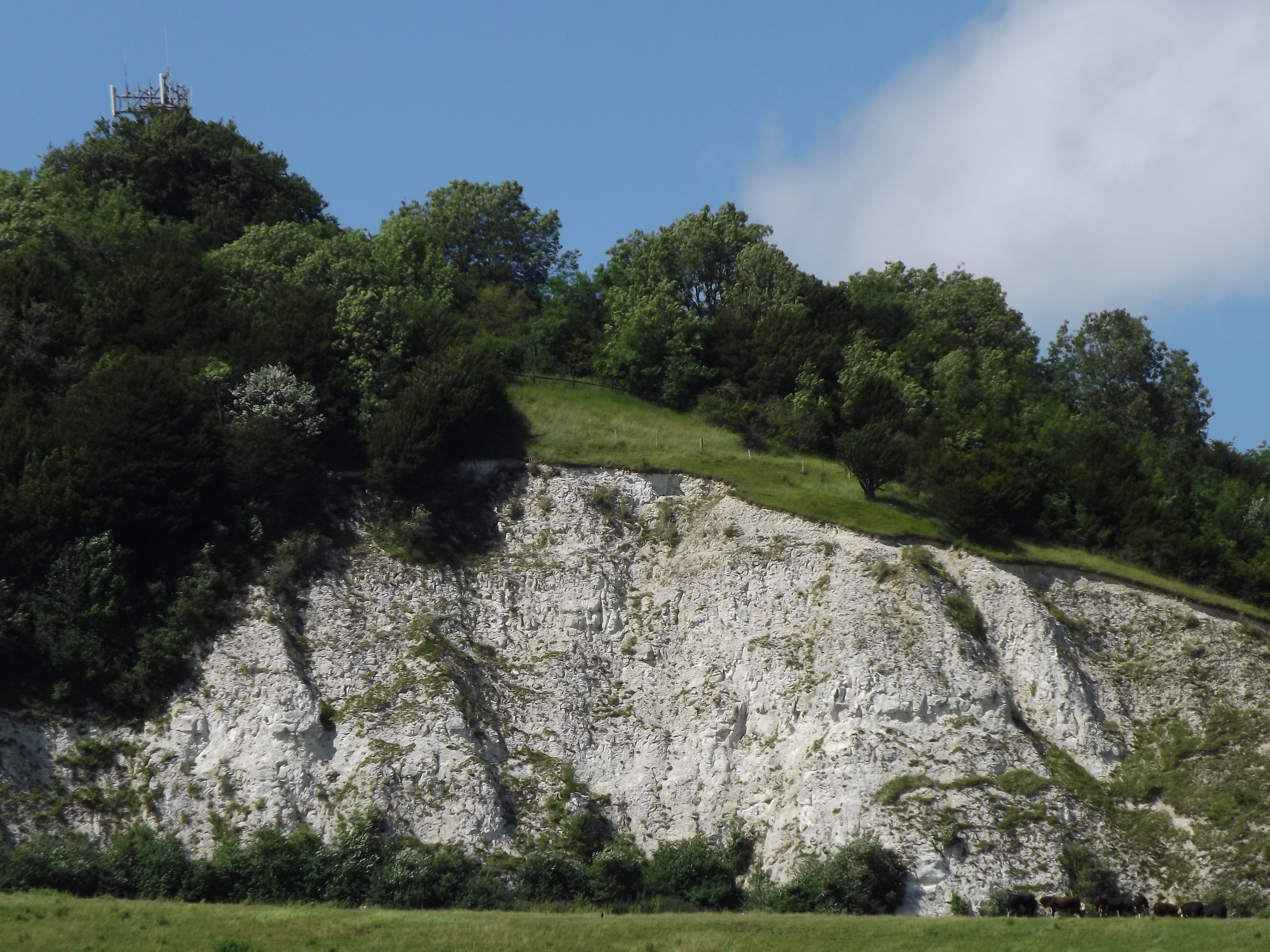
The exposed chalk workings of the former Betchworth Quarry on the south-facing scarp slope of Box Hill. (Note: Note the transmitter mast in the top-left corner of the photograph which, together with the adjacent water tower (not visible in the picture), marks the true summit of Box Hill at 224 m (735 ft) above OD.)

The chalk which comprises the majority of Box Hill (and the rest of the North Downs), has its origins in the late Cretaceous (approximately 100 – 66 million years ago). For the entirety of this period, south east England was covered by a warm, shallow sea in which coccolithophores, single-celled algae with small calcite skeletons, thrived. As the phytoplankton died, their calcium-rich shells were deposited on the sea bed and, over time, formed the chalk we know today.

Overlying the chalk across much of the higher ground on the hill, is a deposit of clay-with-flints. Although the origins of this layer are uncertain, the clay is thought to have been formed during several periods of glaciation and was produced by cryoturbation and decalcification of the chalk. This hypothesis is supported by the presence of flint, which is also found in the underlying strata.

The sandy deposits on Headley Heath have their origin in the Quaternary. The sand and gravels found in this area, indicate the presence of the sea shore. On Headley Heath, these deposits are thin and the chalk also comes to the surface in several places, allowing acid-loving plants to thrive alongside those that prefer alkaline conditions, producing the rare chalk heath habitat.

=== Wealden uplift and erosion of the North Downs escarpment ===
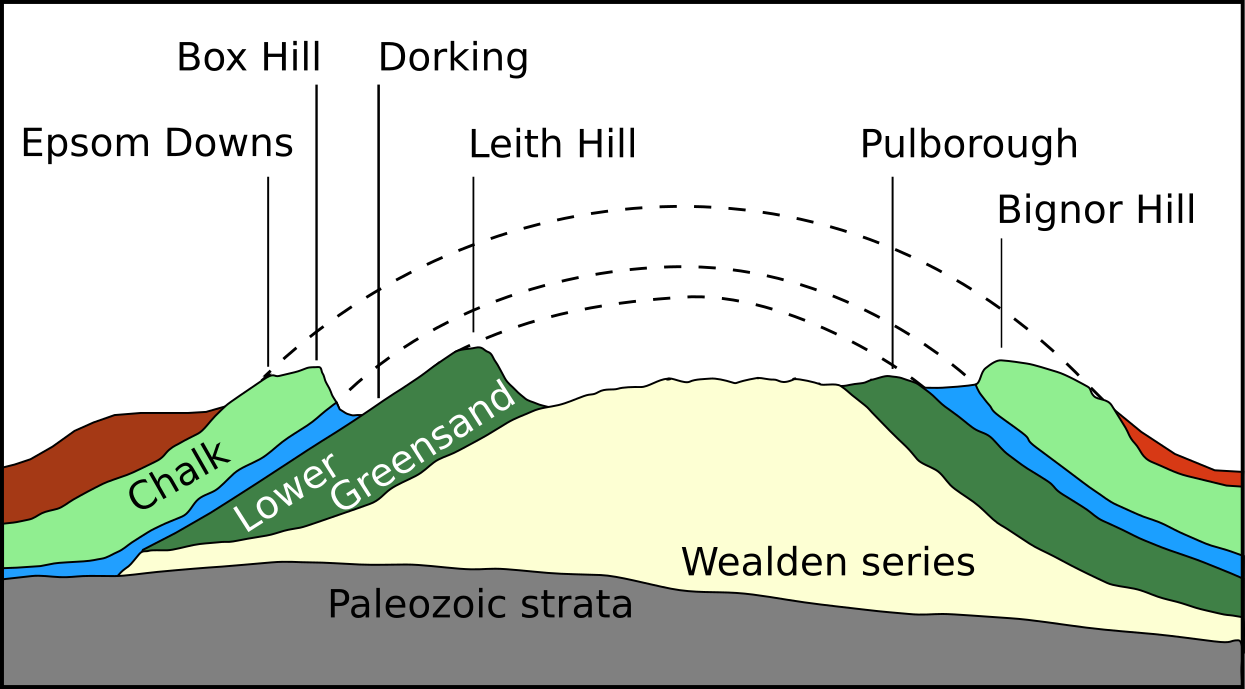
Simplified geological cross section of the western Weald, showing how the land was uplifted to form the Weald-Artois anticline (dashed lines) and the strata as they are today (solid lines).

Following the Cretaceous, the sea covering the south of England began to retreat and the land was pushed higher. The Weald (the area covering modern day south Surrey, south Kent and north Sussex) was lifted by the same geological processes that created the Alps, resulting in an anticline which stretched across the English Channel to the Artois region of northern France. Initially an island, this dome-like structure was drained by the ancestors of the rivers which today cut through the North and South Downs (including the Mole, Wey, Arun and Adur). The dome was eroded away over the course of the Cenozoic, exposing the strata beneath and resulting in the escarpments of the Downs and the Greensand Ridge.

Chalk is a relatively soft rock that may be eroded or weathered in a number of different ways. It is porous, able to absorb up to 20% of its dry weight in water, and therefore highly susceptible to weathering by freeze-thaw action, which may occur over repeated annual or diurnal cycles. This frost weathering produces a mix of rubble and viscous mud, which may be washed downhill, further eroding the landscape (a process known as solifluction). At the west side of Box Hill, the hydraulic action of the River Mole has cut a cliff known as The Whites and the river bed contains coarse chalk rubble (clast), which has fallen from the steep slopes above. Since the chalk contains a very high percentage of calcium carbonate, it can be dissolved by ground water and solubilisation of the rock at the base of the hill may have produced the slabwise slumping or subsidence visible at the top of the Burford Spur. Finally, rainwater, which is mildly acidic, will dissolve and react with the chalk.

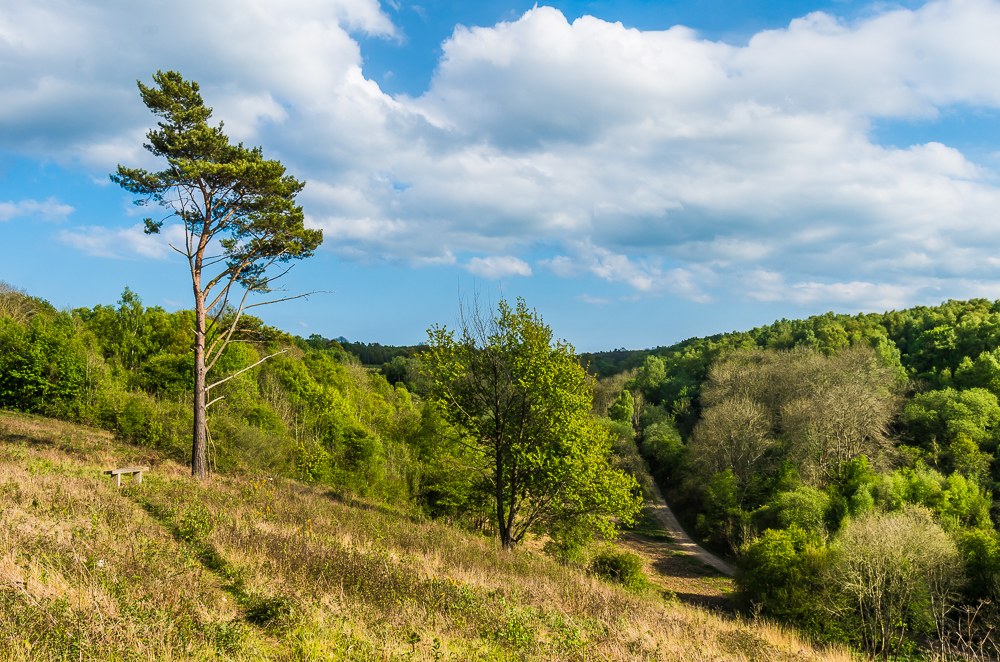
One of two steep-sided combes (dry river valleys) on the western side of Headley Heath.

The eastern and northern boundaries of Box Hill are defined by dry river valleys, now occupied by Pebblehill Road and Headley Lane respectively. These valleys were active during the last ice age, when the chalk bedrock became frozen and impermeable, forcing water to run over the surface in streams rather than percolating into the ground. Both valleys are narrow, twisting and deep, suggesting that they were created by fast flowing torrents, possibly released during periods of rapid snowmelt. (Note: Unlike much of Great Britain, Surrey was never covered by permanent ice sheets. During the Last Glacial Maximum (corresponding to Marine Isotope Stage 5 - 130,000 to 80,000 years ago), the ice sheets reached as far south as St Albans, approximately 55 kilometres (34 mi) north of Box Hill.)

The northern side of Box Hill (corresponding to the dip slope of the cuesta of the North Downs) is cut by six combes, also created by Ice Age watercourses. The westernmost of these combes (between the Burford Spur and Lodge Hill) is climbed by the Zig Zag Road. There is a small reservoir to the west of High Ashurst at the base of the Bullen Wood combe, which is not accessible to the public. All six combes contained tributaries of the stream that created the Headley Valley, which joined the River Mole near Fredley, Mickleham.

=== Quarries and lime kilns ===
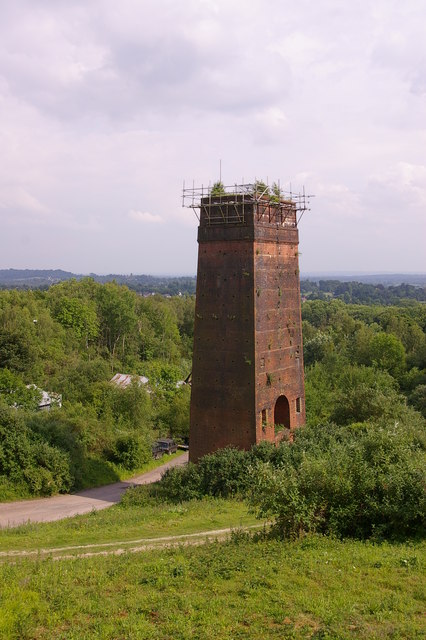
The Smidth Kiln at Betchworth Quarry was constructed in around 1901.

Chalk and flint have been quarried from Box Hill and the surrounding area for many centuries. There are limited surviving examples of the incorporation of chalk blocks (or clunch) into the stonework of local buildings (including Mickleham Church). Walls made of flints, bound together by lime mortar, are particularly common in Surrey and quicklime could be produced with relative ease, by heating chalk above 825 °C (1,517 °F) in a kiln.

Evidence remains of the small-scale chalk quarrying that occurred prior to the Industrial Revolution, including chalk pits both at Warren Farm and close to the Burford Bridge Hotel. The opening of the Dorking to Reigate railway line at the bottom of the hill in 1849, enabled new quarry faces to be opened at Brockham and Betchworth. Sidings were provided adjacent to the main line and there was an extensive network of narrow-gauge railway tracks at both sites. The Brockham Limeworks closed in 1935, however a battery of eight kilns (dating from 1870) still stands and is Grade II listed. The larger Betchworth Quarry and Lime Kilns (approximately 1 km to the east) closed in 1960 and a variety of different kiln types have been preserved and protected with a Grade II listing. The two sites have been designated as Nature Reserves and are managed by Surrey Wildlife Trust. A wide range of bat species now roost in the former kilns.

Gravel was quarried on the northern side of Headley Heath during the 18th and early 19th centuries, most likely to provide material for building local roads.

=== Fossils ===
Numerous fossils, typical of species living in a warm, shallow sea, have been found in the chalk at Box Hill, including brachiopods (Terebratulina gracilis, Terebratulina carnea and Rhynchonella cuvieri), arthropods (Janira quinquecostatus), bivalves (Spondylus spinosus and Ostrea hippodium), urchins (Holaster planus, Micraster leskei) and sponges (Plinthosella squamata).

== Ecology ==
=== Conservation ===
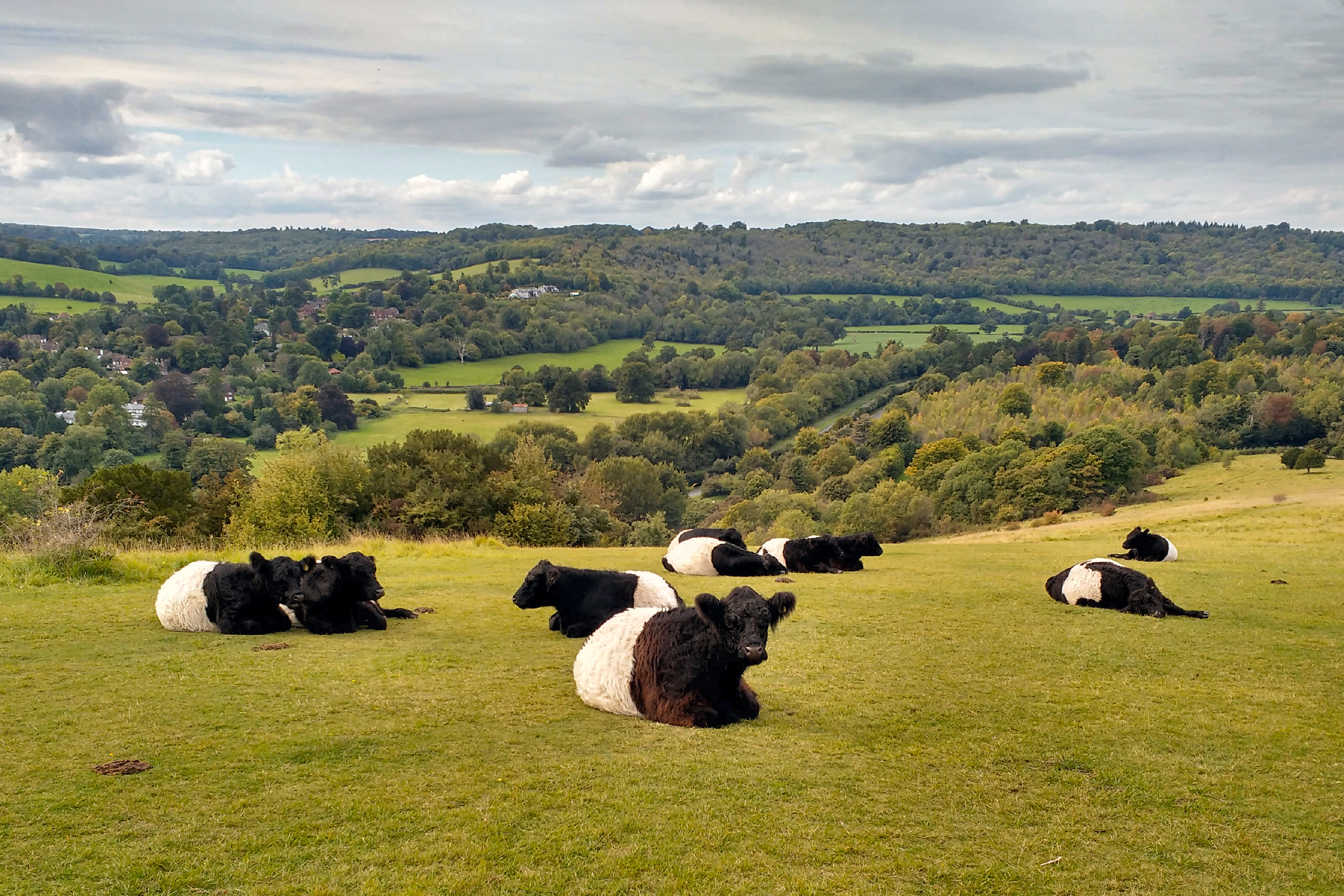
Belted Galloway cattle grazing the Burford Spur on the north western side of the hill.

Box Hill is part of the Surrey Hills National Landscape. The vast majority of the publicly accessible areas of the hill that are managed by the National Trust and Surrey Wildlife Trust, form part of the Mole Gap to Reigate Escarpment Site of Special Scientific Interest and have been designated a Special Area of Conservation.

The chalk downland of Box Hill provides a habitat for a wide range of plant species, which in turn support a varied population of insect species. The alkaline soils are thin and nutrient poor, which prevents deeper-rooted lush grasses (with a high water demand) from dominating. Each square metre of chalk downland may support up to 40 different species.

Without careful management, the grassland would revert to woodland and so these areas of the hill are grazed in order to prevent scrub from becoming overestablished. (Note: Although its spread is often considered undesirable, scrub provides valuable habitat for a range of invertebrates on Box Hill, including the Roman snail, rufous grasshopper and the dark green fritillary.) Both the National Trust and Surrey Wildlife Trust use Belted Galloway cattle (affectionately nicknamed 'Belties'), which crop the grass less hard than other grazers and allow the more delicate wild flowers (including orchids) to flourish. At Betchworth Quarry, Surrey Wildlife Trust allows goats to graze, which can eat woodier plants such as gorse and bramble. Rabbits also make a significant contribution to the control of scrub and coarse grasses on the hill, although their numbers have declined since the introduction of myxomatosis in 1953.

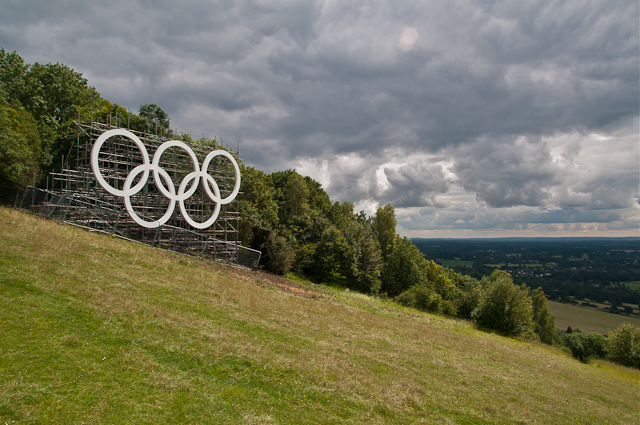
Olympic Rings were installed at the viewpoint in July 2012.

For any conservation area, it is important to find a balance between the interests of people visiting and the needs of the wildlife that it seeks to protect. After the announcement that the Olympic cycling road races would be routed over the hill, concerns were expressed that habitats would be damaged during the event. Scrub clearance along the side of the Zig Zag Road to provide space for spectators began in January 2012, after a pre-race survey (commissioned by the London Organising Committee of the Olympic and Paralympic Games) showed that the work was likely to increase biodiversity. A second ecological survey, performed after the Games, showed that no significant damage had occurred, although some areas were subsequently reseeded.

=== Biodiversity ===
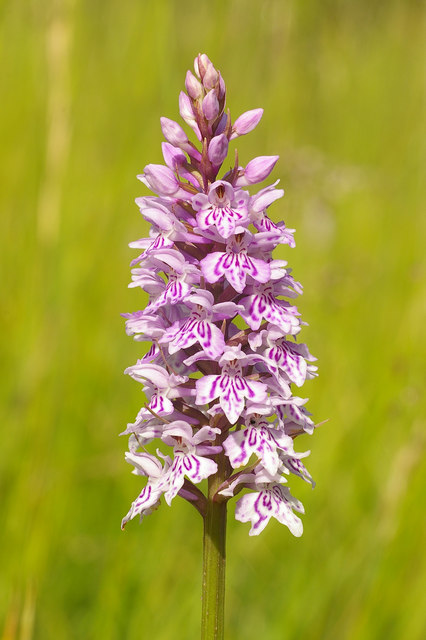
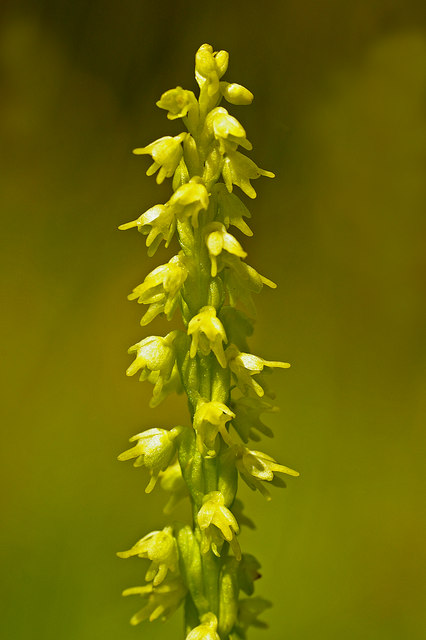
Common spotted (left) and musk (right) orchids growing on Box Hill.

The chalk downland environment supports notable populations of bats, lepidopterans, orchids and the hill's namesake, the box tree (Buxus sempervirens).

==== Orchids ====
A large number of species of orchid have been recorded on Box Hill, including autumn lady's-tresses, bee orchids, bird's-nest orchids, broad-leaved helleborines, common spotted orchids, common twayblades, fragrant orchids, pyramidal orchids and white helleborines.

==== Other wild flowers ====
Wild garlic grows alongside bluebells under the tree canopy beside the River Mole at the western edge of the hill, giving the area its distinctive smell in springtime.

==== Aquatic plants ====
Damasonium alisma (starfruit) was reintroduced to Headley Heath in 2013 using seeds from the Millennium Seed Bank, having been absent since 2000. It is now found in Brimmer Pond (half of which is enclosed to prevent habitat disturbance by dogs) and also in Heath House Pond.

==== Trees ====
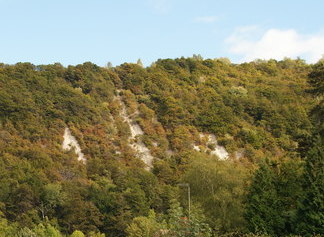
Yew and box trees growing on the west side of the hill. (Note: The cliff above the River Mole is so steep and the soil is so shallow that the bare chalk rock is exposed in several places.)

The box and yew woodland, on the steep-sloping sides of the hill above the River Mole, is of international importance. Common canopy-layer species include beech, ash and oak. Understorey species include holly, hazel, elder and honeysuckle.

Invasive species found on the hill include buddleia, cherry laurel, Japanese knot weed and Canadian goldenrod. Boxwood blight, a fungal disease caused by Cylindrocladium buxicola, is widespread.

==== Bats ====
Several abandoned brick and concrete structures provide habitats for bats and grills have been placed over their entrances to protect the roosting sites. Three species are known to inhabit the old Box Hill Fort: the brown long-eared bat, the noctule bat and Natterer's bat. The brown long-eared bat, Natterer's bat, the whiskered bat and Daubenton's bat have been recorded at both Betchworth and Brockham quarries. Brandt's bat has been recorded at Betchworth; Bechstein's bat and the common pipistrelle have been recorded at Brockham.

==== Butterflies and moths ====
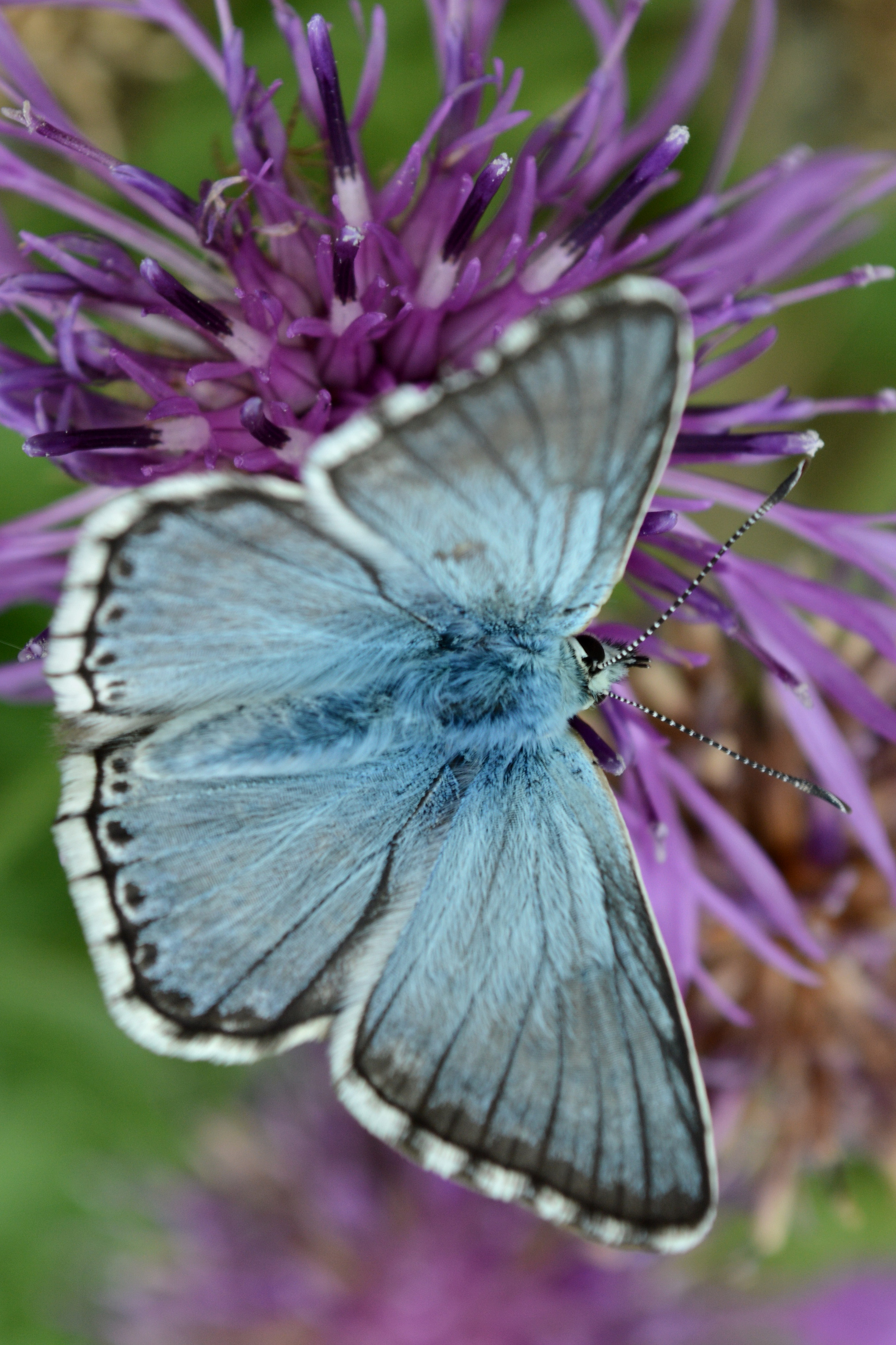
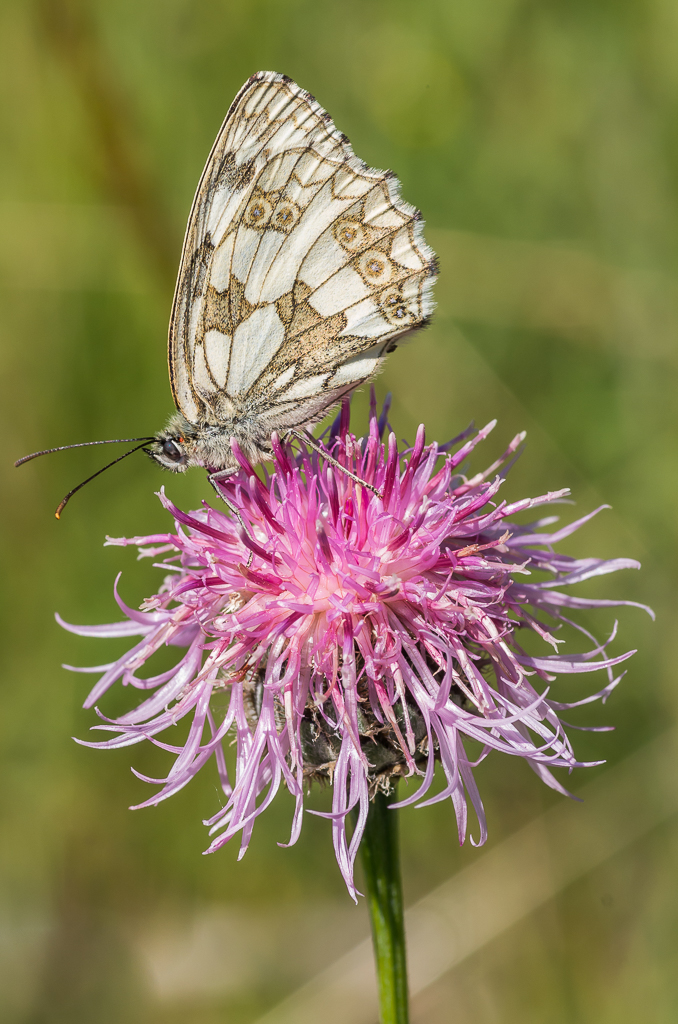
Chalkhill blue (left) and marbled white (right) butterflies on knapweed flowers on Box Hill.

Box Hill supports 38 different species of butterflies. Species include silver-spotted skipper, Adonis blue and chalkhill blue (grassland); brown hairstreak (scrub); purple emperor and white admiral (woodland). The small pearl-bordered fritillary was present on the hill in the 1970s, but has not been recorded locally since 1997.

Kidney vetch, growing in the Zig Zag Valley and below the Viewpoint, supports populations of the small blue. To create new habitats for the butterflies, a number of ‘scrapes’ were excavated in the late 2010s, exposing bare chalk on which vetch can become established with minimal competition. Buddleia removal was also initiated as part of the same programme.

Rare moth species found on the hill include the straw belle, chalk carpet, lace border, orange-tailed clearwing and the Surrey midget moth.

==== Other insects ====
The hill has given its name to a species of squash bug, now found throughout south-east England.

== Recreation ==
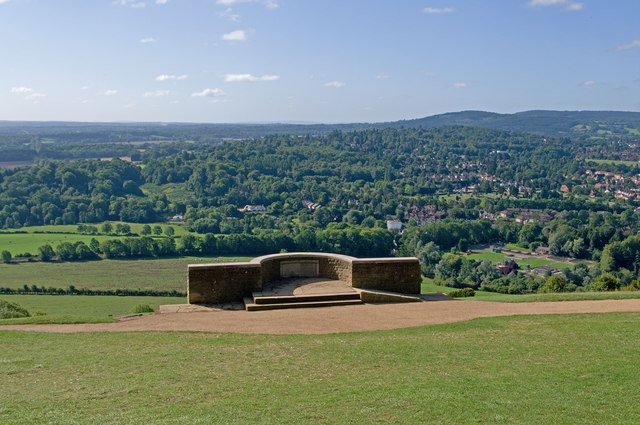
Salomons Memorial viewpoint, looking south, in 2010

=== Box Hill Country Park ===
The western part of Box Hill, managed by the National Trust, was designated a Country Park in 1971 and some of the outbuildings associated with the Box Hill Fort are in use as a visitor centre, gift shop and servery. In 2011, a Natural Play Trail was constructed close to the visitor centre, cofunded by the National Trust and the Friends of Box Hill.

On the hill there are car parks and a panoramic view over the Weald towards the South Downs may be enjoyed from the Salomons Memorial (more commonly known as the viewpoint). (Note: A common misconception is that the Salomons Memorial (at 172 m (564 ft) above OD) marks the highest point of the hill, however the land continues to rise to the east. The true summit of the hill is at Betchworth Clump at 224 m (735 ft) above OD and is currently occupied by a water tower and transmitter mast.) Juniper Top, on the northern side of the hill, offers views to the northwest towards Windsor Castle.

The Country Park is crisscrossed by a large number of footpaths and bridleways, and there are several signposted, self-guided trails.

=== Cycling ===
Zig Zag Road
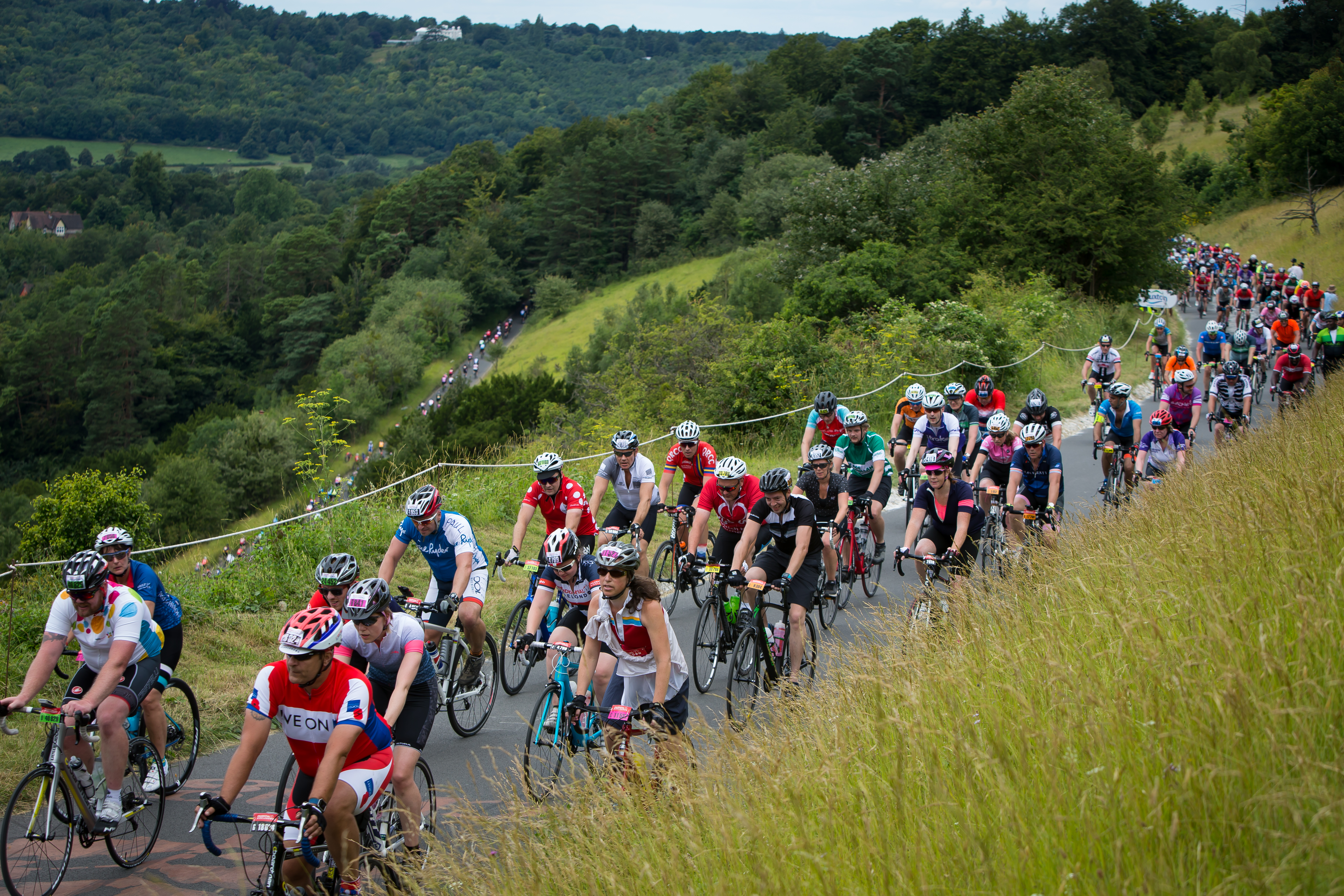
- Prudential Ride-London 100: Amateur cyclists ascending the Zig Zag Road (July 2016)
- Location: Box Hill, Surrey
- Gain in altitude: 120 m (390 ft)
- Length of climb: 2.5 km (1.6 mi)
- Maximum elevation: 175 m (574 ft)
- Average gradient: 5.0 %
- Maximum gradient: 7.3 %
- Website: Box Hill Olympic Circuit

Box Hill has been popular with cyclists since the 1880s and by the 1890s, Dorking Cycle Club was organising camps for amateur cyclists from across the south east of England. (Note: In February 2017 the Sunday Times newspaper identified Box Hill as one of the top six rural cycling accident blackspots in the UK, stating that seven accidents on the Zig Zag Road had been reported to the Police in 2015.) The 2012 Summer Olympic cycling road races included 15.8 km (9.8 mi) mid-race circuits of Box Hill. An estimated 15,000 spectators travelled to the hill on 28 July 2012 to watch the men's race, which included nine circuits and the following day, competitors in the women's race climbed Box Hill twice.

The 15.8 km (9.8 mi) Box Hill Olympic circuit is generally cycled in an anticlockwise direction and begins to the south of the village of Mickleham with an ascent of the hill via the Zig Zag Road. From the National Trust Visitor Centre, the route turns eastwards, running along the escarpment and through the urban area of Box Hill village, reaching a maximum elevation of 216 metres (709 ft) above Ordnance Datum. After 6.6 kilometres (4.1 mi) the route turns northwest along the B2033, passing through the village of Headley. After 9.5 kilometres (5.9 mi), the circuit begins a continuous descent to the valley of the River Mole, passing to the south of Leatherhead, before turning southwards again through Mickleham to return to the start.

The Zig Zag Road is a steady climb of 120 metres (390 ft) over 2.5 kilometres (1.6 mi) and has, although on a much smaller scale, been likened to the Alpe d'Huez in the French Alps. (Note: On 15 August 2014 Ciaran O'Hara and Roger Barr cycled up the hill 73 times to complete a challenge known as Everesting, in which cyclists repeatedly climb a hill to gain the same vertical elevation (8848 m) as Mount Everest.) The exact date of construction is uncertain: The road first appears on the Ordnance Survey map of 1869, but is not shown in a watercolour painting dated 1861 by William Leighton Leitch, which is owned by the Royal Collection. The Zig Zag Road is not a public right of way and is closed for one day each year by the National Trust, to preserve its private road status.

As part of the 2011 London Prepares series, the London–Surrey Cycle Classic for professional cyclists was organised to test the Olympic course. The Prudential RideLondon-Surrey 100 and London–Surrey Classic, for amateur and professional cyclists respectively, have taken place annually following the Games and, although the course has undergone several alterations from the 2012 Olympic course, the two races always include a climb of Box Hill.

=== High Ashurst ===
High Ashurst is an outdoor education and activity centre on the northern side of Box Hill, adjacent to Headley Heath. The centre is run by Surrey Outdoor Learning and Development on behalf of Surrey County Council. Previously the site comprised the grounds of a country house, which was demolished in the 1970s, having been derelict for several decades.

=== Boidier Hurst campsite ===
The District Scout Associations of Leatherhead and Epsom and Ewell own a 4.0-hectare (10-acre) campsite, located between Box Hill village and Headley Heath. There are 11 areas for pitching groups of tents, set within coppiced chestnut woodland. Washing, toilet facilities and a kitchen are available. Use of Boidier Hurst is restricted to members of The Scout Association, The Guide Association and to local school groups on Duke of Edinburgh's Award expeditions.

== Points of interest ==
=== Betchworth Clump ===
The highest point on Box Hill is immediately to the east of Box Hill village at 224 m (735 ft) above OD. The area is known as Betchworth Clump after a distinctive group of beech trees, which were present at the start of the 20th century. Today, the dense woodland at the summit conceals a water tower and transmitter mast, neither of which are accessible to the public.

The concrete water tower was built in 1930 by East Surrey Water, the forerunner of SES Water. The structure was refurbished in 2009 to extend its working life by at least 25 years; modifications included the relining of the water bowl, repair of cracks in the walls and roof, as well as the provision of a new access staircase.

The 30m-high mobile phone mast was constructed in 2003 and is operated by Vodafone and EE Limited.

=== Broadwood's Folly ===
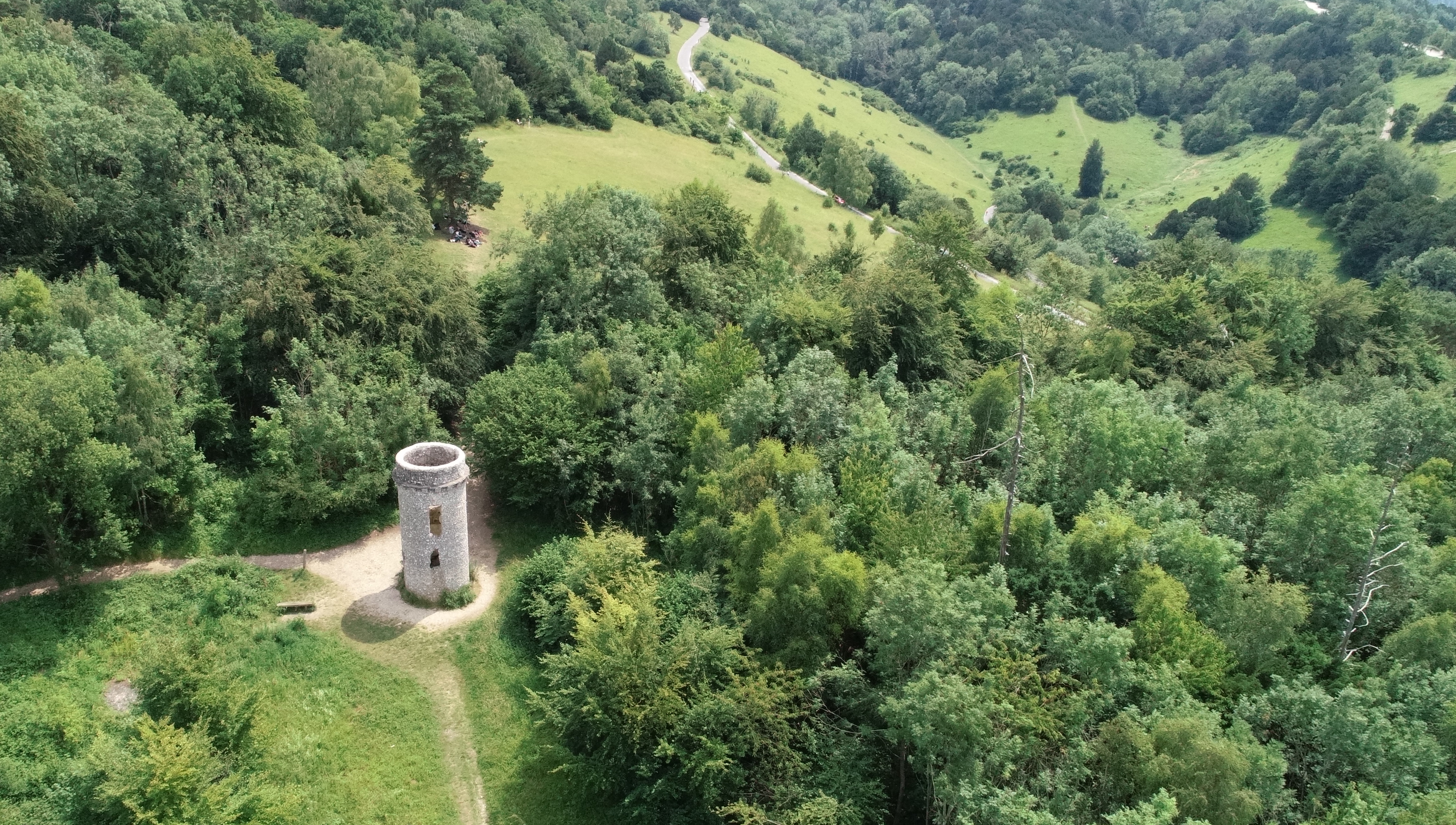
Broadwood's Folly was built in around 1820. Part of the Zig Zag Road is visible to the right of the tower.

The circular flint tower located on the northern tip of Lodge Hill was built for the piano maker Thomas Broadwood, who purchased Juniper Hall in 1815. It is approximately 8 metres (26 ft) high and originally had two internal floors, linked by a spiral staircase. The original doorway is visible on the east side, but has been sealed with rough flints. An avenue of beech trees linked the folly to Juniper Hall, although these were destroyed by the Great Storm of 1987. The tower may have been built to commemorate the Battle of Waterloo.

A sparkling wine, produced by Denbies Wine Estate for the Lidl supermarket chain, has been named after the folly.

=== Labilliere's grave ===
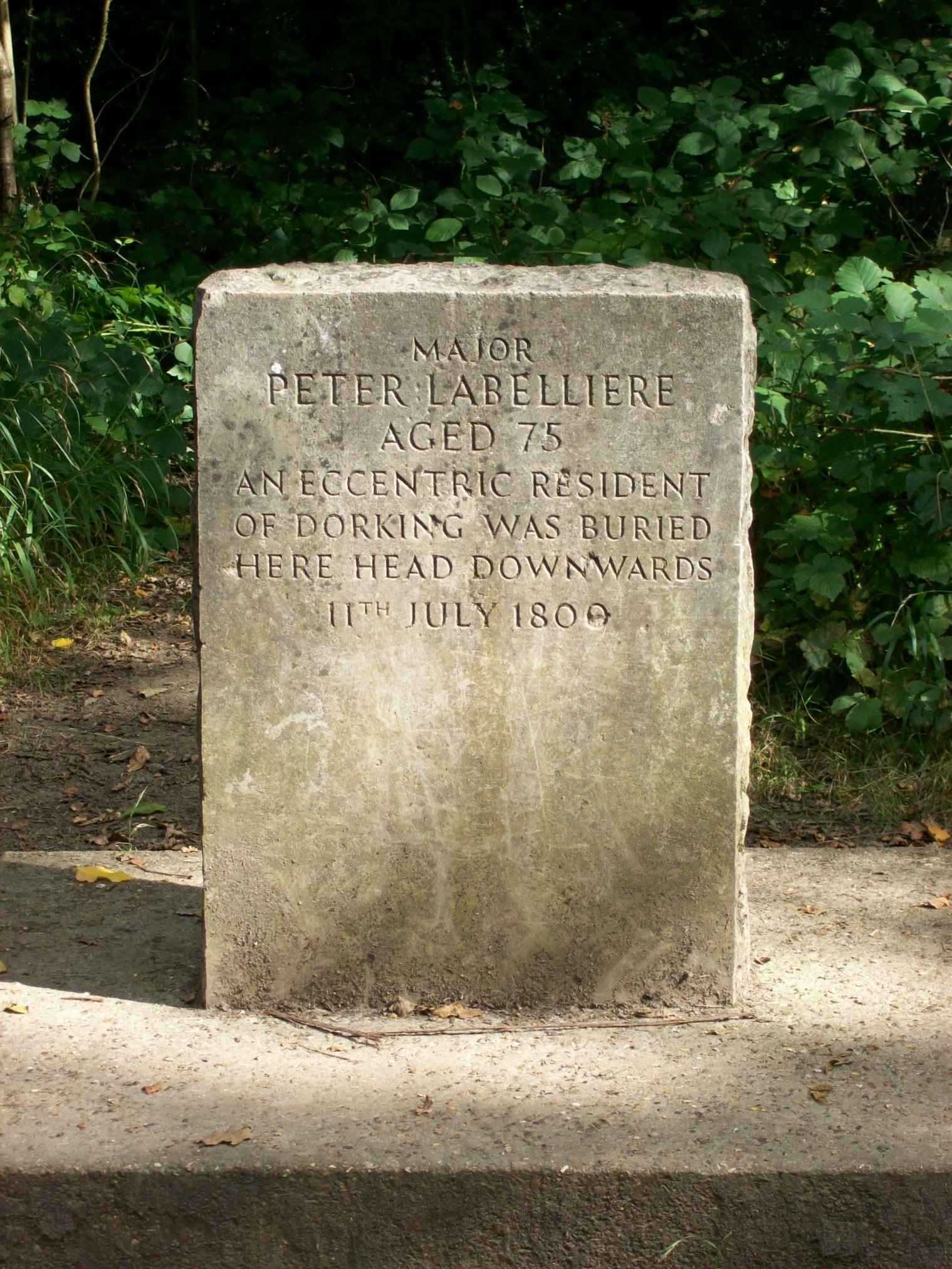
Labilliere's tombstone

Peter Labilliere was born in Dublin on 30 May 1725 to a family of French Huguenot descent. He joined the British Army at the age of 14, becoming a major in 1760. After leaving the army he became a political agitator and was accused in 1775 of bribing British troops not to fight in the American War of Independence, although he was never tried for treason.

After moving to Dorking in around 1789, Labilliere often visited Box Hill to meditate. With old age he became increasingly eccentric and neglected his own personal hygiene to such an extent that he acquired the nickname "the walking dung-hill". He died on 6 June 1800. In accordance with his wishes he was buried head downwards, on 11 June on the western side of Box Hill above The Whites. In the presence of a crowd of thousands that included visitors from London as well as the local "quality gentry", Labilliere was buried without any religious ceremony, having reportedly said that the world was "topsy-turvey" and that it would be righted in the end if he were interred thus. However, in his "Book of Devotions", he wrote that he wished to emulate the example of St Peter, who was crucified upside-down according to tradition.

The current memorial stone on Box Hill is not believed to mark the exact location of his burial (which is thought to be several metres to the west on a steep incline). There are two errors on the stone itself: He was buried in June 1800 (rather than July) and all surviving manuscripts indicate that he spelt his name Labilliere (rather than Labelliere).

=== Weypole and Stepping Stones ===
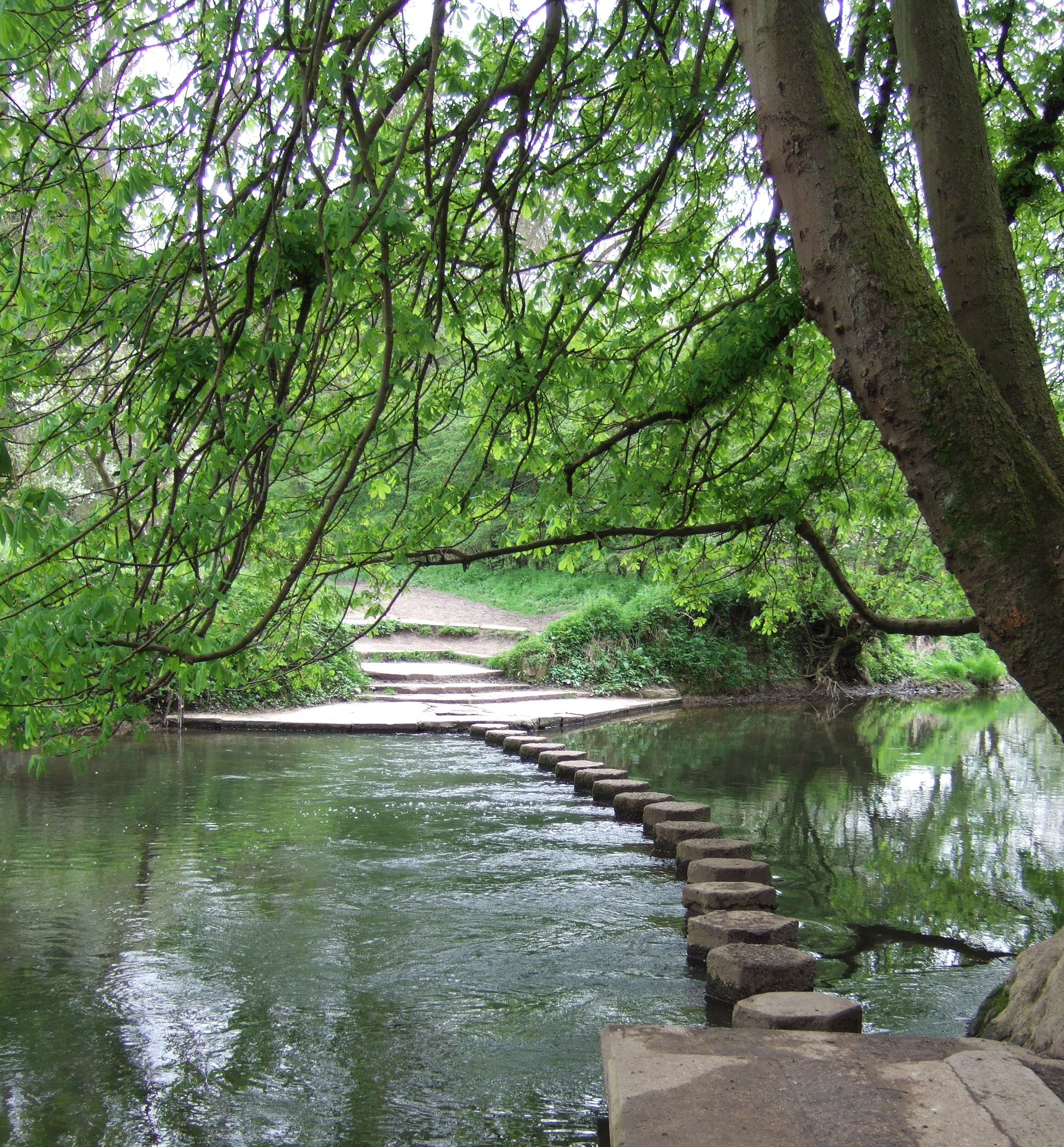
The Stepping Stones at the foot of Box Hill. The photograph is taken from the west bank of the Mole, looking across the river to the Weypole.

The Weypole (or Waypole) is a roughly semi-circular 2.4 ha (5.9-acre) area of level ground at the foot of Box Hill, between The Whites and the River Mole. It was originally part of the grounds of Burford Lodge, built by John Eckersall in 1776, and the prevalence of apple and cherry trees suggests that it was used as an orchard for a time. The Burford Lodge estate was later owned by the horticulturalist Sir Trevor Lawrence, who created a garden along the banks of the Mole for his collection of orchids.

A ford across the River Mole is thought to have existed here since prehistoric times. The way-pole was a notched post, secured in the riverbed to indicate the depth of the water. Stepping stones at this site are first recorded in 1841 and they may have been installed by an owner of Burford Lodge to facilitate access to the Weypole orchard. The crossing was formally reopened on 11 September 1946 by Prime Minister Clement Attlee, at the request of James Chuter Ede, a local politician and Attlee's Home Secretary. The new stones replaced those removed during the Second World War as an anti-invasion measure. (Note: Chuter Ede paid for the reinstatement of the stones, a total of £156 19s 6d. He commented that the cost of the work was "considerably higher than I expected".)

The location is popular with both anglers and families, although swimming is strongly discouraged. The stones give their name to the pub in the nearby village of Westhumble.

=== Other ===
The Burford Bridge Hotel and Juniper Hall Field Studies Centre lie at the foot of Box Hill close to the river Mole. Both are rich in historical associations with famous visitors and residents.

== Notable former residents ==
=== John Logie Baird ===
John Logie Baird (1888-1946), the inventor of the first working television system, lived at Box Hill from 1929 until 1932. He had first demonstrated the new technology in early 1926, and continued with his work when he moved to Swiss Cottage on the top of the hill. He installed a small-scale electricity generating plant in a purpose-built outbuilding, to provide electrical power for his experiments, which included test transmissions to the roof of the Red Lion pub in Dorking High Street. He also demonstrated his Noctovisor, an infrared viewing device, which was designed to enable ships to see each other at night or in fog.

Swiss Cottage was built in the mid-19th century and is protected by a Grade II listing. It is not accessible to the public.

=== Brodie family ===
Brockham Warren was the family seat of the Brodie baronets. Sir Benjamin Collins Brodie, 1st Baronet (1783-1862) was a physiologist and surgeon, who performed pioneering research into bone and joint diseases. He served as sergeant-surgeon to both William IV and subsequently Queen Victoria. He was made a baronet in 1834 and was President of the Royal Society from 1858 to 1861. His son, Sir Benjamin Collins Brodie, 2nd Baronet (1817-1880), was a Chemistry Professor at Oxford University from 1865 to 1872, and is chiefly known for his investigations into the allotropic states of carbon and for his discovery of graphitic acid.

=== George Meredith ===
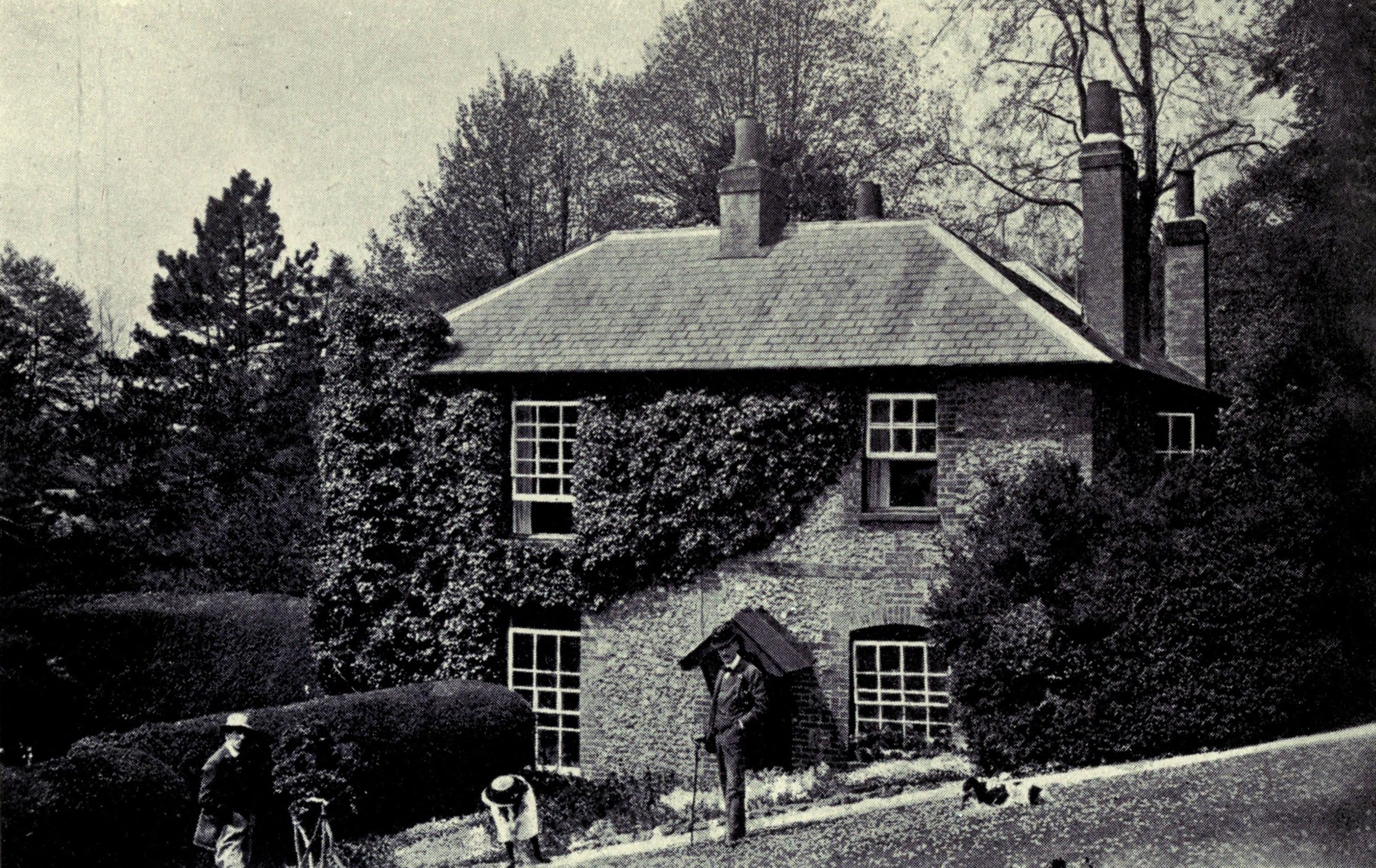
George Meredith and family members, photographed in the rear garden of Flint Cottage, Box Hill.

The author George Meredith (1828-1909) lived in Flint Cottage from 1868 until his death. He built a chalet in the garden in which he wrote. Today the house is protected by a Grade II listing and is not accessible to the public.

Among several works written at Box Hill, Meredith's poem The Lark Ascending, published in 1881, inspired Ralph Vaughan Williams to compose the musical work of the same name. A second poem, Love in the Valley (published in 1883 as part of a collection entitled Poems and Lyrics of the Joy of Earth), is said to have been inspired by the part of Box Hill known as Juniper Bottom or Happy Valley.

The part of the hill immediately opposite the cottage is known as Barrie's Bank, because the author J. M. Barrie supposedly waited there, while summoning the courage to introduce himself to Meredith.

=== E. F. Warburg ===
The botanist Edmund Frederic ("Heff") Warburg (1908-1966) grew up at Boidier, a house close to the southeastern corner of Headley Heath. His father was a keen gardener and had assembled a large collection of exotic plants at the family home. Heff became reader in plant taxonomy at Oxford University and was a fellow of New College.

His mother, Lady Warburg, gave the land for Boidier Hurst Camp Site to the District Scout Associations of Leatherhead and Epsom and Ewell in 1946 and her family donated the neighbouring, 9-hectare (22-acre) Heath Plantation to the National Trust following her death in 1952.

=== Edvard Westermarck ===
The Finnish philosopher and sociologist Edvard Westermarck (1862-1939) rented Keeper's Cottage as his summer residence between 1910 and 1927.

== Registered charities ==
The National Trust owns around half of the land on Box Hill (principally the Country Park in the west and Headley Heath in the north-east). Surrey Wildlife Trust manage Brockham Limeworks (owned by Surrey County Council) as well as Betchworth Quarry and Lime Kilns (privately owned). Both Trusts rely on the support of volunteer groups, working alongside paid employees, to carry out conservation and education work.

The Friends of Box Hill (FoBH) is a local organisation, which supports the National Trust in its work in the Country Park. Several of its members advise the Trust on its wildlife management plans and the FoBH also fund specific projects, including the purchase of equipment and improvement of visitor facilities. They also organise a programme of social events, which includes regular talks by Trust staff.

The Friends of Headley Heath (FoHH) coordinate volunteer working parties to assist National Trust Rangers and also run a series of social events.

(Both the FoBH and FoHH are independent of the National Trust.)

== Transport links ==
=== Public transport ===
Box Hill & Westhumble is the closest railway station to the National Trust Country Park (approximately 500 m) and is served by trains from both London Victoria and London Waterloo. Both Dorking Deepdene and Dorking (Main) stations are around 1 km from the south western corner of the hill. Betchworth station is at the south eastern corner of the hill.

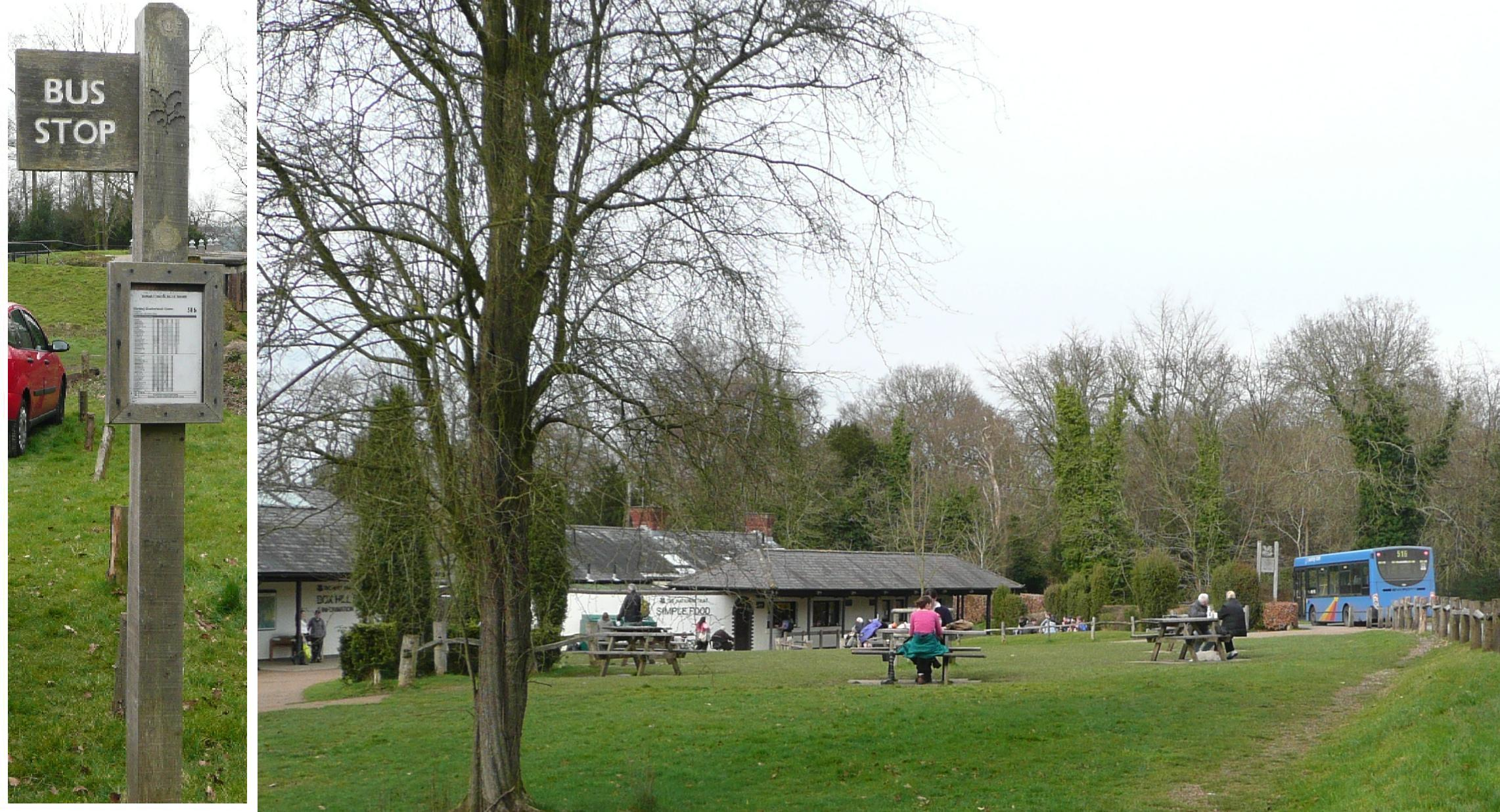
A Sunray Travel bus passing the visitor centre. Inset left shows the special wooden National Trust bus stop, with logo engraved.

Box Hill is served by local and London bus routes.

=== Access for motor vehicles ===
Access to the National Trust Country Park from the A24 dual carriageway is via the B2209 and the Zig Zag Road, however this route is not suitable for buses or coaches. Alternative access is via the B2033 and Boxhill Road, which leads through Box Hill village and approaches the Country Park from the west. Headley Heath is directly accessible from the B2033.

=== Cycle routes ===
National Cycle Route 22 runs along the northern boundary of the hill via Lodgebottom Road and Headley Lane, before turning south along the A24 close to the western boundary. The Surrey Cycleway approaches Box Hill from the west via Westhumble, before turning to the south towards Dorking.

=== Walking ===
The North Downs Way long-distance footpath from Farnham to Dover, crosses the River Mole at the Stepping Stones and then runs from west to east at the top of the scarp slope, passing in front of the Salomons Memorial.

The Thames Down Link follows the course of Stane Street across Mickleham Downs, to the north of Box Hill, and meets the North Downs Way close to the Burford Bridge Hotel.

== Cultural references ==
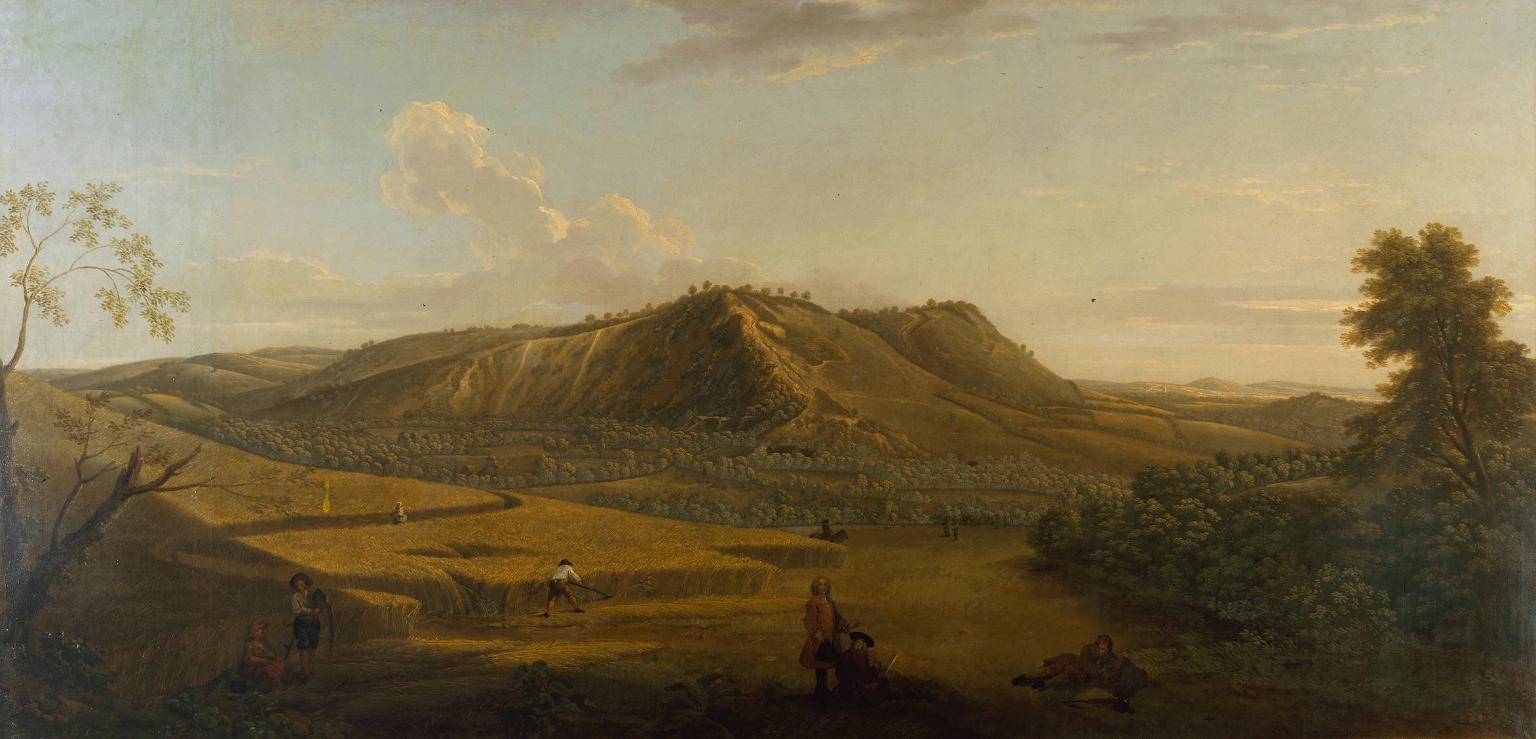
A view of Box Hill, Surrey (1733) by George Lambert – held by The Tate.

=== Art ===
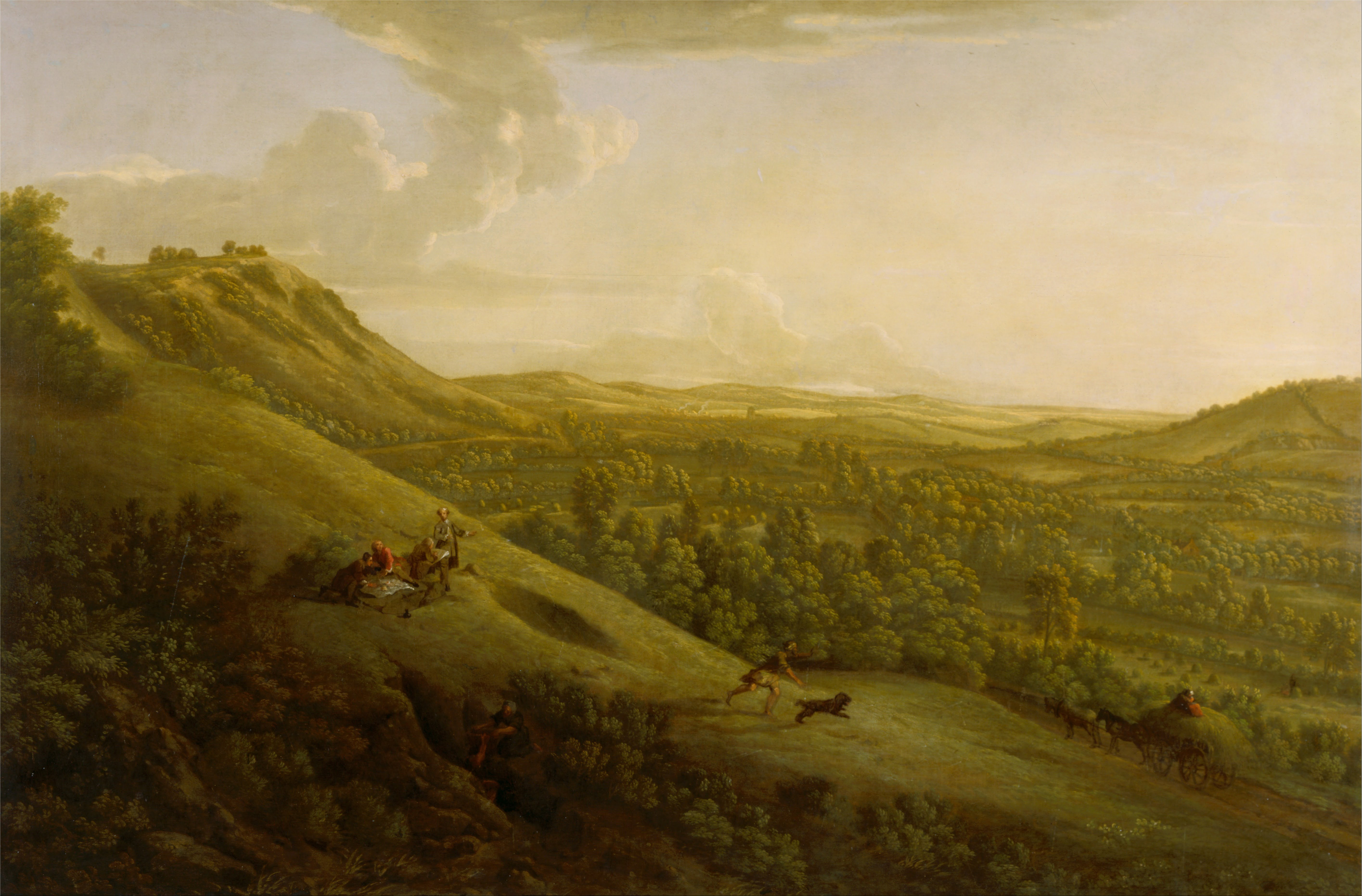
Box Hill, Surrey with Dorking in the distance (1733) by George Lambert – held by the Yale Center for British Art.

In 1733, George Lambert painted two views of Box Hill, now held by The Tate and the Yale Center for British Art.

The Stonebreaker (1857 -1858), a painting by John Brett (1831–1902), depicts a young boy breaking stones for road mending, with Box Hill in the background.

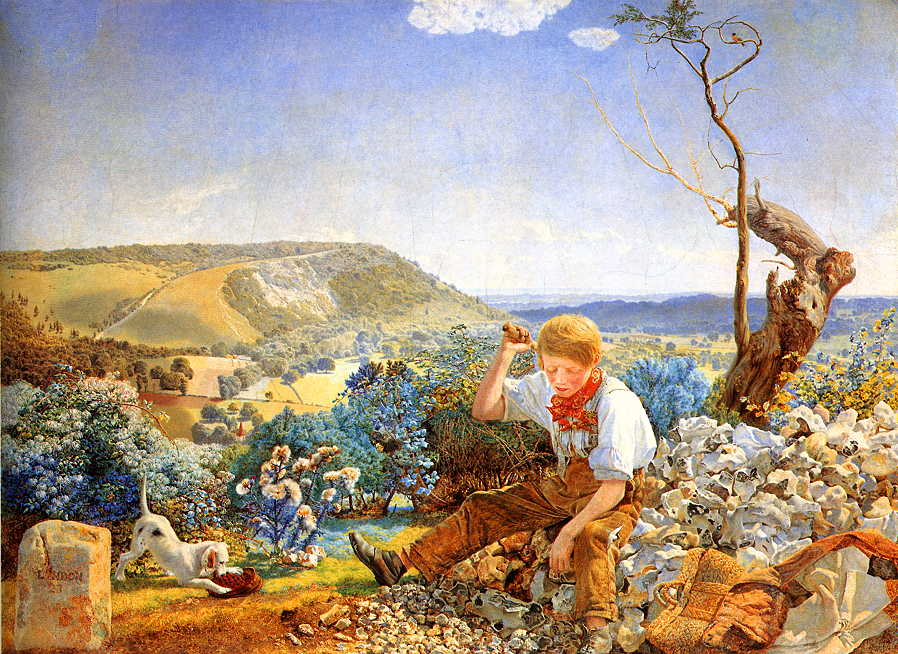
Box Hill forms the backdrop to The Stonebreaker, painted by John Brett in 1857–1858.

A watercolour entitled Box Hill, Surrey dated 1861 by William Leighton Leitch (1804–1883), which depicts the view looking northwards from the top of the Burford Spur before the Zig Zag Road was built, is part of the Royal Collection.

The Box Hill Road River, a highly curved, 100-metre (330 ft) line painted onto the surface of the Zig Zag Road by the British sculptor and land artist Richard Long, was commissioned jointly by the London 2012 Festival and the National Trust to celebrate the route of the Olympic Cycling road races.

=== Literature ===
John Evelyn notes in his Diary in 1662 that Box Hill was frequented by the ladies and gentlemen from nearby Epsom spa.

Daniel Defoe (the author of Robinson Crusoe) was educated for five years (until around the age of fourteen) at the Rev. James Fisher's boarding school in Pixham Lane, Dorking. He writes extensively about the area around Box Hill in his travelogue, A tour thro' the whole island of Great Britain (1724–1727), which describes the country shortly before the start of the Industrial Revolution. He records that in the late 17th century, Sir Adam Browne the then landowner, approved the fitting out of a cave or vault close to what is now the Salomons Memorial, to supply 'refreshment' to visitors to the hill. A group of young Dissenters from Dorking were so disgusted by the 'debauched' behaviour that the sale of alcohol encouraged (which took place even on Sundays), that they stormed up the hill one Saturday night and blew up the cavern with gunpowder.

The writer Edward Beavan describes the hill and the surrounding area of Surrey in his poem Box-Hill, a descriptive poem, published in 1777.

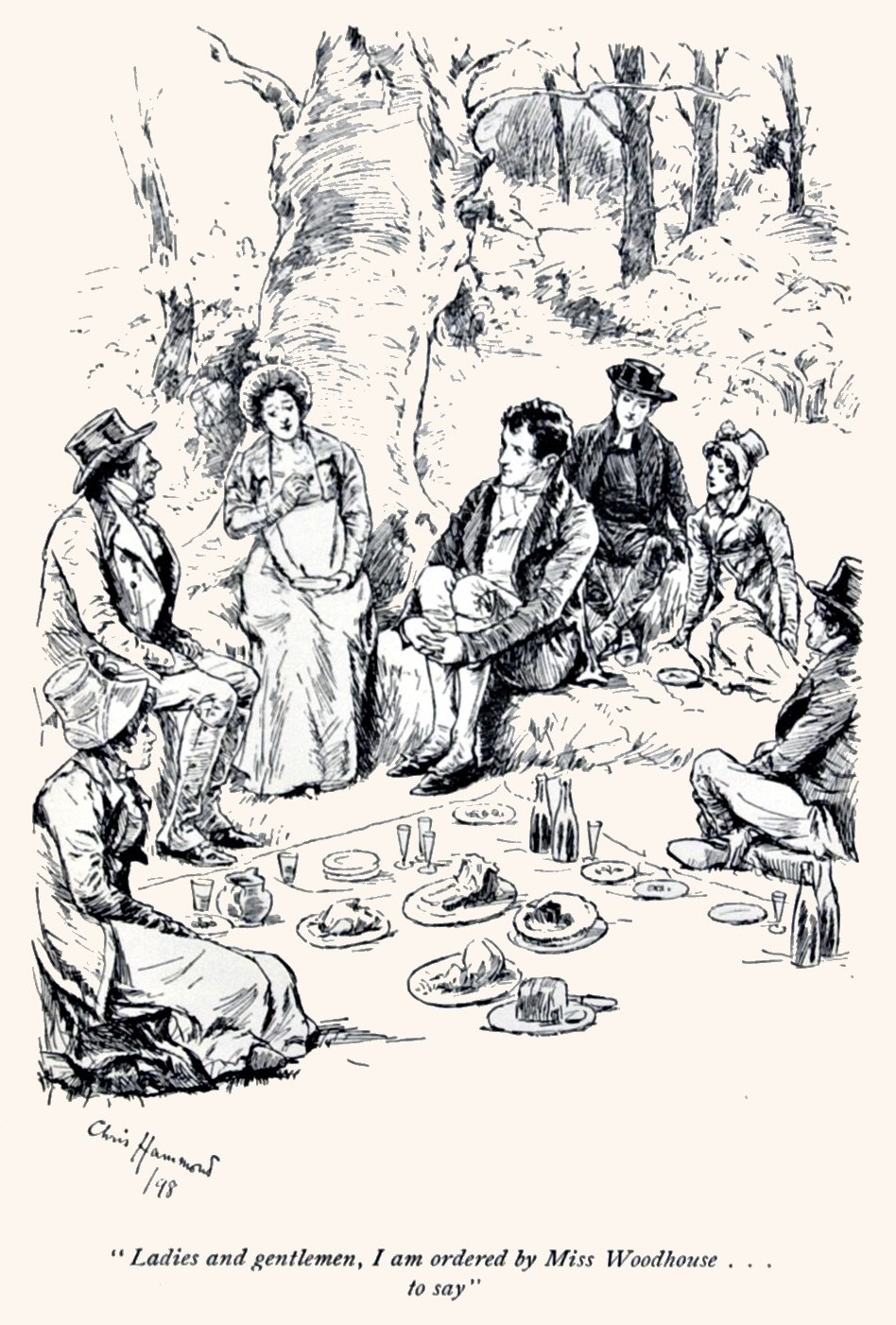
The Picnic at Box Hill: Pen-and-ink drawing by Chris Hammond (1860–1900) for the 1898 edition of Emma by Jane Austen.

The 'picnic scene', a pivotal passage of Jane Austen's novel Emma (first published in 1815) is set at Box Hill.

Celia Fiennes, a contemporary of Defoe, described Box Hill in her travel memoirs, which were published in 1888 (almost 150 years after her death) under the title Through England on a Side Saddle.

"Box Hill… is the Continuation of the Ridge of hills I mentiond by Maidstone; its a Greate height and shows you a vast precipice down on the farther side, and such a vast vale full of woods Enclosures and Little towns. There is a very good river that runs by a Little town Called Darken just at the foote of this hill, very famous for good troutts and great store of ffish. On this hill the top is Cover'd with box whence its name proceeds, and there is other wood but its all Cutt in Long private walks very shady and pleasant, and this is a great diversion to the Company and would be more ffrequented if nearer Epsom town."

In England: A Nation, (London: R. Brimley Johnson, 1904), edited by Lucian Oldershaw, and in a chapter entitled "The Patriotic Idea" written by G. K. Chesterton, the beauty of Box Hill violated by an invading army is used to express a healthy patriot's love for his nation as opposed to the jingoistic nationalism of tabloid newspapers:

"But just as a man who has been in love will find it difficult to write a whole frantic epic about a flirtation, so all that kind of rhetoric about the Union Jack and the Anglo-Saxon blood, which has made amusing the journalism of this country for the last six years, will be merely impossible to the man who has for one moment called up before himself what would be the real sensation of hearing that a foreign army was encamped on Box Hill."

Mystery author Cyril Hare sets his 1954 novel, That Yew Tree's Shade (published in the US as Death Walks the Woods), at "Yew Hill", which Hare admits in an introduction is modelled on Box Hill.

In his novel, Box Hill, published in 2020, British author Adam Mars-Jones tells the story of a same-sex relationship between a teenager and an older man, set within the Surrey motorbiking fraternity of the mid-1970s.

=== Music ===
British biker rock band Dumpy's Rusty Nuts released a single called Box Hill or Bust in 1984. The song is something of a cult anthem for bikers and reflects the popularity of Box Hill among the biking community.

In Public Image Limited's song Flowers of Romance, John Lydon sings "I've got binoculars. On top of Box Hill".

In Richard Thompson's song 1952 Vincent Black Lightning (released in 1991), Box Hill is the location to which James and Red Molly ride on James' motorcycle. In cover versions of this song by American musicians, Box Hill is sometimes changed to Knoxville, a city in Tennessee.

The first song on Ben Watt's 1983 debut album North Marine Drive is entitled On Box Hill.

Actor and singer Tom Felton's song called Time Well Spent mentions him going to "chill out on Box Hill".

=== Film ===
The racing scenes during the opening credits of the 1968 film Chitty Chitty Bang Bang were filmed on the Zig Zag Road.

The 2012 British film Berberian Sound Studio contains a short film-within-the-film – a spoof 1970s-style documentary about the outstanding natural and man-made features of Box Hill.

== In the news ==
In 1963 Great Train Robber, Jimmy White, hid £30,440 (approximately one fifth of his share of the stolen cash), in a caravan at Clovelly Caravan Park at the top of Box Hill.

In 1995 teenager Ruth Wilson disappeared after being dropped off by taxi on Box Hill.

In 2013 a body that had lain undiscovered for two years was found on Box Hill. It was identified as missing teacher Brian Hynard who had left two suicide notes before disappearing.

== Notes ==
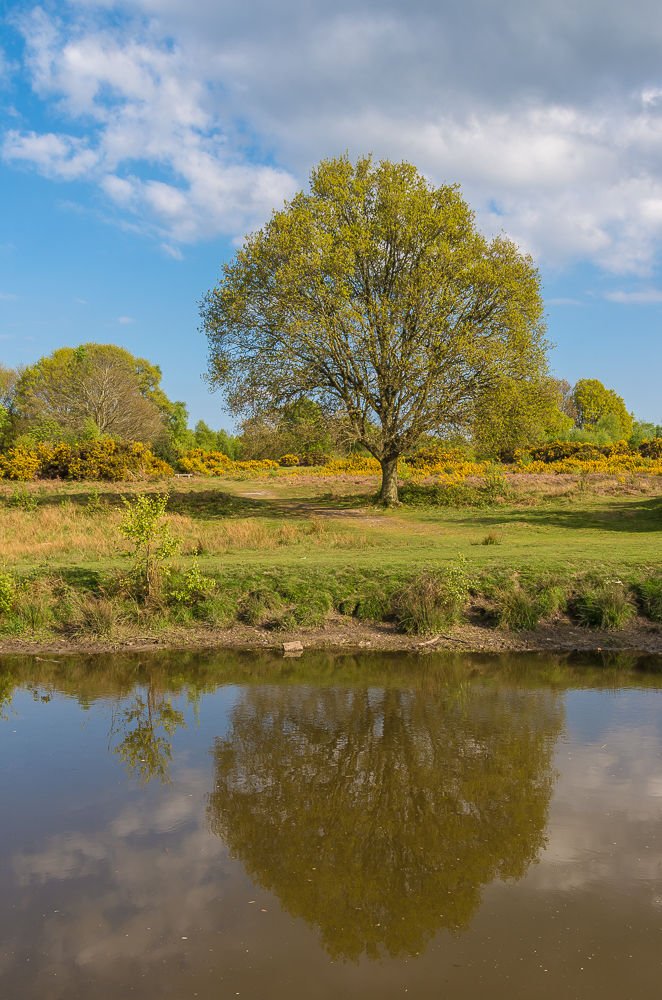
Bellamoss Pond, Headley Heath. (Note: There are six ponds on Headley Heath: Aspen Pond, Bellamoss Pond, Brimmer Pond, Browns Pond, Heath House Pond and Hopeful Pond. Only Brimmer Pond is of significant age.)

== Bibliography ==
- Ashton, S; Blight, G (2006). The South East of England: Exploring Woodland. London: Frances Lincoln. ISBN 978-0-7112-2659-3.
- Bannister, NR (1999). The Box Hill Book of Archaeology. Dorking, Surrey: Friends of Box Hill. ISBN 0-9534430-1-9.
- Beanse, Alec; Gill, Roger (2011). The London Mobilisation Centres. Hampshire: David Moore. ISBN 978-0954845377.
- Beavan, E (1777). Box Hill, a descriptive poem. London: Wilkie.
- Belloc, H (1911). The Old Road. London: Constable and Company. Archived from the original on 1 February 2019.
- Brayley, E. W.; Britton, J. (1841). A topographical history of Surrey. Surrey: Dorking.
- Burns, RW (2000). John Logie Baird: Television pioneer. History of Technology. Vol. 28. London: Institution of Electrical Engineers.
- Chadwick, AA; Chadwick, AE (2006). The Classic Cattleyas. Portland, Oregon: Timber Press. ISBN 978-0-88192-764-1.
- Chapman, GM; Young, RHD (1979). Box Hill. Lyme Regis: Serendip. ISBN 0-9504143-1-X.
- Dines, HG; Edmunds, FH; Chatwin, CP; Stubblefield, CJ (1933). The geology of the country around Reigate and Dorking : Explanation of one-inch geological sheet 286, new series. London: British Geological Survey. Archived from the original on 2 January 2021.
- Evelyn, John (1870). Memoirs illustrative of the life and writings of John Evelyn, Esq., F.R.S., author of the "Sylva," &c., &c.: comprising his diary, from the year 1641 to 1705-6, and a selection of his familiar letters. New York: GP Putnam.
- Fiennes, Celia (1888). Through England on a Side Saddle in the Time of William and Mary. London: Leadenhall Press.
- Hart, Stephen (2021). James Chuter Ede: Humane Reformer and Politician. Barnsley: Pen & Sword. ISBN 978-1-52-678372-1.
- Headley, G; Meulenkamp, W (1986). Follies: A National Trust Guide. London: Jonathan Cape. ISBN 0-224-02105-2.
- Hutchings, GE; Bridges, EE; Sankey, JHP (1969). Box Hill, Surrey. Dorking, Surrey: Box Hill Management Committee.
- Lander, J (2000). Peter Labilliere: The Man Buried Upside Down on Box Hill. Chertsey: Post Press. ISBN 978-0-9532424-1-2.
- Littledale, H; Locock, L M; Sankey, J H P (1984). Box Hill. Dorking, Surrey: Box Hill Management Committee.
- Margary, Ivan D (1948). Roman Ways in the Weald. London: J M Dent. ISBN 0-460-07742-2.
- Mountford, F (1974). The Box Hill Guide. Tadworth: Mountford. ISBN 0-9503540-0-7.
- Sankey, A (2000). The Box Hill Book of Orchids. Dorking, Surrey: Friends of Box Hill. ISBN 0-9534430-2-7.
- Shepperd, Ronald (1991). Micklam the story of a parish. Mickleham Publications. ISBN 0-9518305-0-3.
- Timbs, J (1877). English Eccentrics and Eccentricities. Vol. 1. London: Chatto and Windus.
- Tuson, Dan (2013). Box Hill. London: The National Trust. ISBN 978-1-84359-367-6.
- Wainwright, D (1982). Broadwood by Appointment: A History. London: Quiller Press. ISBN 0-907621-10-4.
- Warren, S (2010). 100 Greatest Cycling Climbs: A road cyclist's guide to Britain's hills. London: Frances Lincoln. ISBN 978-0-7112-3120-7.
- Wooldridge, SW; Hutchings, GE (1957). London's Countryside : Geographical Field Work for Students and Teachers of Geography. London: Methuen.
