= Betchworth Quarry and Lime Kilns =

Nature reserve in Surrey, England

Coordinates: 51.259°N 0.260°W

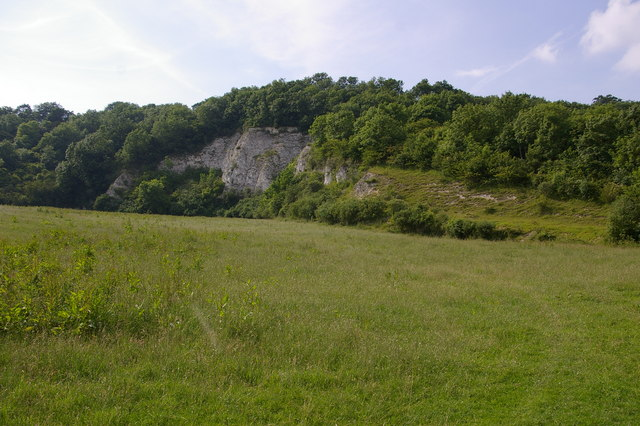
- Interactive map of Betchworth Quarry and Lime Kilns
- Type: Nature reserve
- Location: Betchworth, Surrey
- OS grid: TQ198511
- Area: 27 hectares (67 acres)
- Manager: Surrey Wildlife Trust

Betchworth Quarry and Lime Kilns is a 27-hectare (67-acre) nature reserve north of Betchworth in Surrey. Betchworth Quarry only is managed by Surrey Wildlife Trust. It is part of the Mole Gap to Reigate Escarpment Site of Special Scientific Interest and Special Area of Conservation.

This chalk downlands site is part of the North Downs and the Surrey Hills Area of Outstanding Natural Beauty. It has a rich variety of flowering plants, including orchids. The lime kilns house a variety of bat species, such as the whiskered, Natterer's, brown long-eared, Brandt's and Daubenton's. A flight of white Doves nests in the Smidth kiln.

== History ==
Chalk has been quarried on a small scale in the area around Dorking since at least the 1600s. In 1865 the Dorking Greystone Lime Company was incorporated to open a large quarry at Betchworth by William Finlay an engineer. A standard gauge siding was laid from Betchworth railway station to the lime kilns built at the foot of the North Downs escarpment.

The form of kilns used for lime burning evolved throughout the history of the industry, from small intermittent clamp and flare kilns, to large continuously fired draw kilns that could satisfy increased demand from urban development, industrial growth and agricultural improvement.

In 1805 in "A Compendium of Modern Husbandry", James Malcom stated that "the best limestone pits in the country, if not England, were at Dorking and the lime from these is sought after by every Mason and Bricklayer in London. Both the Wapping and West India Docks are reputed to be built with Dorking lime.

In Vol.3 of the "Victorian County History of Surrey" it is noted that "chalk furnishes the chief industry. Chalkpits and limeworks have existed for time out of mind and the very extensive works of the Dorking Gray Stone and Lime Company, are in the parish, where lime is burnt and cement manufactured on a large scale" These early kilns were fired by wood obtained from the then extensive nearby forests and were worked by both men and women.

The lime kilns date from the late 19th century and include the buried remains of two Hoffman kilns (built 1865 and 1867), and were a 'ring' kiln in which chalk was burned in a series of adjoining chambers below ground level with a central flue or stack, these are now buried below the site. The standing remains of two batteries of flare kilns (1867 and 1872) with later Dietzsch kilns (1887 and 1897), and a Smidth kiln of about 1901, also still standing. All of the standing lime kilns are Listed Buildings Grade II.

In 1870 a Southern Battery of six flare kilns were built to make 'Selenitic' cement.

In 1875 the Eastern Battery of six flare kilns were built, and then replaced by continuous feed kilns, in 1923 there were three kilns at the south end of the battery

The "Dietzch" kiln for the manufacture of cement was adapted for making lime and in 1887 a pair of kilns using this system, and burning slack coal, were erected on the sites of two earlier flare kilns, which were coned-shaped kilns, fired initially by coke and then coal. Ten years later a further two "Dietzch" kilns were built on the site of a further flare kiln.

The continuous burning 'Brockham' Kilns were built from 1889 by Alfred Bishop.

The Smidth kiln 1901, is a modification of the Dietzsch kiln with two chimneys in a single tower, it has arched opening through the tower to feed fuel into the chamber below, it has never been fired.

In 1900 a new adit was driven into the beds of heathstone on the east side of the site.

In 1901 an aerial ropeway was built to a gantry over these kilns by the Ropeway Syndicate Limited, London, to Roe's Patent. This came from a point high above the main quarry near where there is a viaduct over the Pilgrim's Way.

The Flare kilns in the southern battery were last used in 1924.

During both wars, POWs were employed at the quarry, coming from Guildford by train.

The quarry had four different railway gauges, standard gauge from the main line, 3' 21/4'' kilns to quarry, 19'' to the Hearthstone mine, and a 2' line from the kilns to a hydrator plant at the Southern Battery.

In 1984, permission was granted for part of the quarry to be filled with spoil excavated during the construction of the Gatwick Airport North Terminal. Four years later, Nionisle, the quarry owners, were given permission to accept commercial and industrial waste for dumping, initially for a period of ten years, but subsequently extended to 2002.
