= Fraser Down =

Nature reserve in Surrey, England

Coordinates: 51.260°N 0.266°W

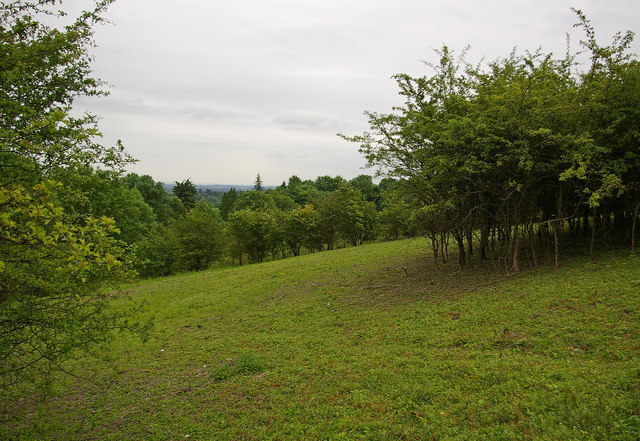
- Interactive map of Fraser Down
- Type: Nature reserve
- Location: Betchworth, Surrey
- OS grid: TQ211526
- Area: 10 hectares (25 acres)
- Manager: Surrey Wildlife Trust

Fraser Down is a 10-hectare (25-acre) nature reserve north of Betchworth in Surrey. It is managed by the Surrey Wildlife Trust. It is part of the Mole Gap to Reigate Escarpment Site of Special Scientific Interest and Special Area of Conservation.

This is mainly chalk downland with some yew and beech woodland. The grassland has the rare silver-spotted skipper butterfly and wildflowers such as cowslip and Wild Marjoram.

There is no public access to the site.
