= Burford Bridge Hotel =

Hotel in Surrey, England

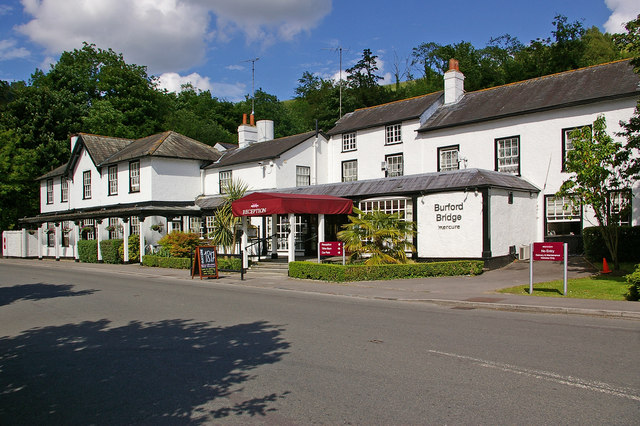
- Old London Road frontage

- Location within Surrey
- Former names: Fox and Hounds (1254-1882); Hare and Hounds (1882-1905)

General information
- Location: foot of Box Hill near Dorking, Surrey, Old London Road, Mickleham, Dorking, England
- Coordinates: 51.2542°N 0.3219°W
- Current tenants: Mercure Hotels, Accor
- Opened: 1254
- Renovated: 2014
- Owner: Moorfield Group (since 2007)

Renovating team
- Other designers: Trevillion Interiors

Other information
- Number of rooms: 57

Listed Building – Grade II
- Official name: Burford Bridge Hotel
- Designated: 11 June 1973
- Reference no.: 1028876

Burford Bridge Hotel is a historic hotel at the edge of the village of Mickleham, Surrey, England. It is to the south of Leatherhead and north of Dorking at the foot of Box Hill on the River Mole.

The hotel has been owned by Moorfield Group (a UK private equity firm) since 2007 and is operated by Accor Hotels under their mid-market Mercure brand.

== History ==
The hotel was founded in 1254 as the 'Fox and Hounds', and parts of the present buildings date back to the 16th century. The land on which the hotel stands was a detached part of the medieval Manor of Thorncroft (in Leatherhead) and was held in the mid-thirteenth century by Walter de Merton, the founder of Merton College, Oxford University.

The main building, adjoining Old London Road, dates from the early nineteenth century. In 1882 the hotel became the 'Hare & Hounds', and was commonly known as the Burford Bridge. In 1905, Surrey Public Trust purchased it from Sir Trevor Lawrence, and it changed permanently to the Burford Bridge Hotel, later merging with Trusthouses in 1948.

A 16th century mediaeval tithe barn from the nearby village of Abinger Hammer was re-erected adjoining the hotel in 1934 and now forms the core of the banqueting suite. The barn is alleged to include beams from ships of the Spanish Armada. An outdoor swimming pool was added in the same decade and the changing rooms have been restored to their original 1930s appearance. The Garden Bedrooms were built in 1973 and adjoin the main hotel.

The hotel was flooded on 24 December 2013 when the River Mole burst its banks after heavy rainfall. Nine members of staff and 27 guests were evacuated by boat. The hotel was reopened on 1 September 2014 following renovation.

=== Notable Guests ===
After leaving London, John Keats took a room overlooking the gardens, and completed his epic poem Endymion there in 1817. (Keats is said to have been recommended the hotel by the essayist and literary critic William Hazlitt.) Robert Louis Stevenson was a guest in March 1878, during which time he wrote two short stories: Story of the Young Man with the Cream Tarts and Story of the Physician and the Saratoga Trunk. Other prominent visitors included Queen Victoria, Jane Austen, William Wordsworth and Sheridan. It was here too that Lord Nelson spent secret hours with his love Emma Hamilton, before going to vanquish Napoleon's fleet at the Battle of Trafalgar.

The American businessman, Alfred Gwynne Vanderbilt, visited the hotel frequently in the 1890s, stopping to take lunch and to collect telegrams. He and a number of other millionaires, including James Hazen Hyde, practised the old English coaching techniques of the early 19th century for sport. Vanderbilt would frequently drive the coach, perfectly apparelled as a coachman or groom. His party would take a one-day, two-day, or longer trip along chosen routes through several counties, going to prearranged inns and hotels along the routes, of which the Burford Bridge was one. A memorial to Alfred still stands at Holmwood a few miles south of the hotel.
