= Dawcombe =

Nature reserve in Surrey, England

Coordinates: 51.259°N 0.260°W

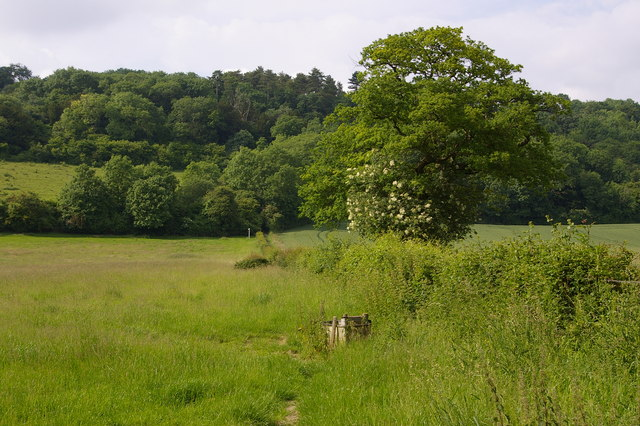
- Interactive map of Dawcombe
- Type: Nature reserve
- Location: Reigate, Surrey
- OS grid: TQ 215 525
- Area: 23 hectares (57 acres)
- Manager: Surrey Wildlife Trust

Dawcombe is a 23-hectare (57-acre) nature reserve north-west of Reigate in Surrey. It is managed by the Surrey Wildlife Trust. It is part of the Mole Gap to Reigate Escarpment Site of Special Scientific Interest and Special Area of Conservation.

This site is mainly chalk grassland with large areas of hawthorn scrub and woodland. The grassland provides a habitat for many species of orchids, including pyramidal, fly, common spotted, man, greater butterfly, fragrant and bee.

There is no public access.
