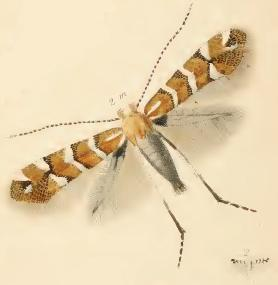

Scientific classification
- Domain: Eukaryota
- Kingdom: Animalia
- Phylum: Arthropoda
- Class: Insecta
- Order: Lepidoptera
- Family: Gracillariidae
- Genus: Phyllonorycter
- Species: P. scabiosella

Binomial name
- Phyllonorycter scabiosella (Douglas, 1853)

Synonyms
- Lithocolletis scabiosella Douglas, 1853

= Phyllonorycter scabiosella =

Species of moth

Phyllonorycter scabiosella is a moth of the family Gracillariidae. It is found from Great Britain through Germany, Poland and Ukraine to southern Russia and from the Netherlands to Spain and Italy.

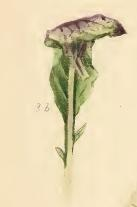
Mined Scabiosa columbaria leaf

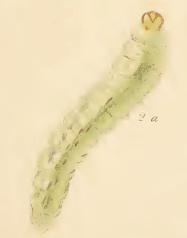
Larva

The larvae feed on small scabious (Scabiosa columbaria).
