= Clay-with-Flints =

Geological term

In geology, Clay-with-Flints describes a series of mineral deposits distributed throughout southern England. While the composition of each deposit varies in mineral types and concentrations, they typically contain mixtures of red clay with flints. Similar deposits have also been identified in northern France, referred to as "Argile à silex."

== Nomenclature and definitions ==
The name Clay-with-Flints was first proposed by William Whitaker in 1861 to describe a particular deposit located at Chiltern Hills. Over the years the name was adopted to refer to a variety of formations throughout southern England thought to be of common origin. To clear up the ambiguity several definitions have been proposed. J. Loveday proposed defined it as yellowish red or red-brown clay with up to 50% of flints, a few flint and quartzitic pebbles, and small amounts of sand, that rests in the plateau areas on an irregular, solution affected chalk surface.

== Occurrence ==
The Formation is associated with deposits of the Chalk Group, subsequent Palaeogene and Neogene strata, and occasionally Upper Greensand. It occurs in sheets or patches of various sizes over a large area in the south of England, from Hertfordshire on the north to Sussex on the south, and from Kent on the east to Devon on the west. It almost always lies on the surface of the Upper Chalk, but in Dorset, it passes on to the Middle and Lower Chalk, and in Devon, it is found on the Chert-Beds of the Selbornian group.

== Origin ==
The formation is now considered to be a combination of residual and cryoturbated strata, and to be of a variety of ages.
