= High Ashurst =

High Ashurst Outdoor Education Centre
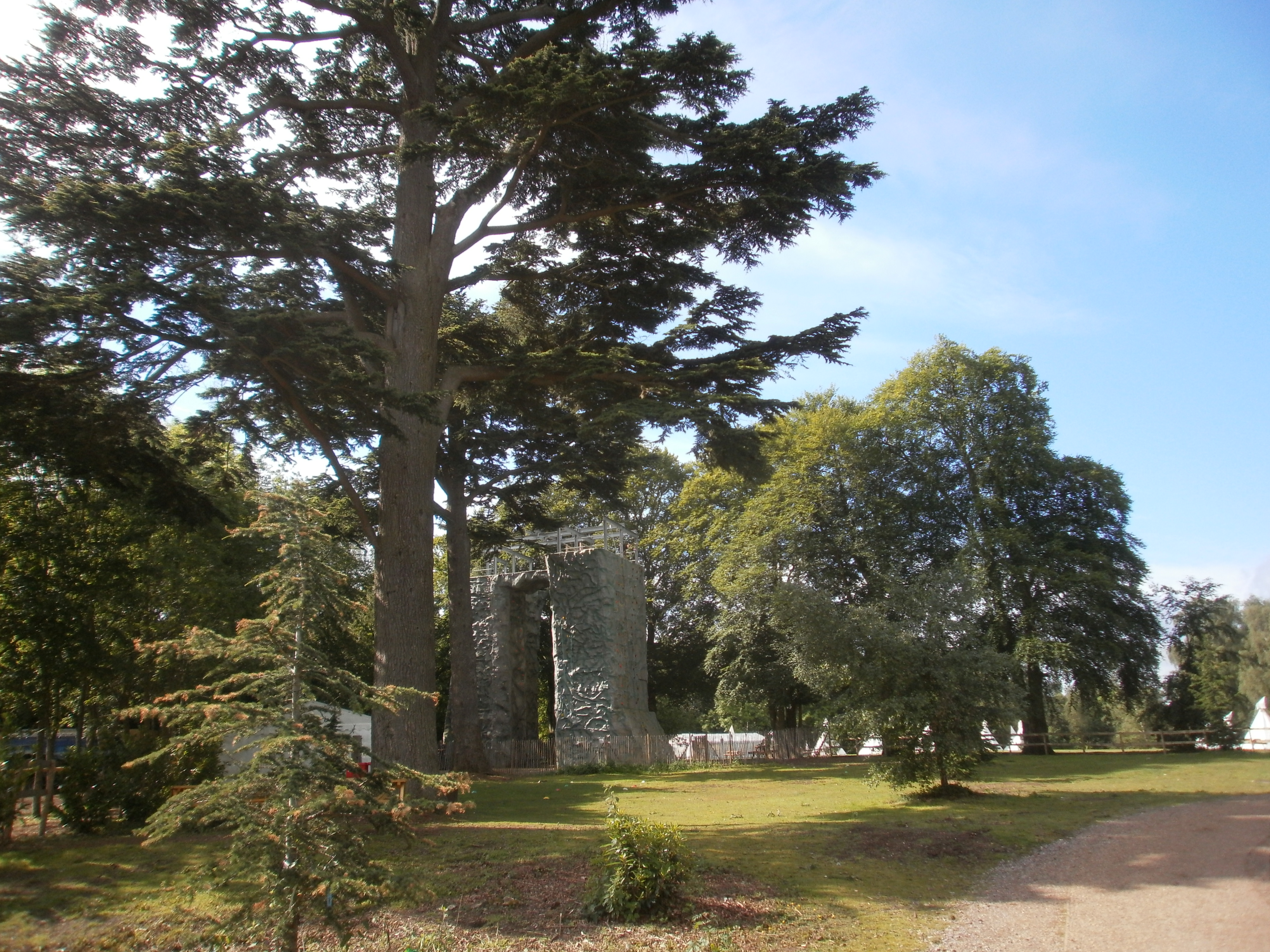
- Part of the site at High Ashurst Outdoor Education Centre, including woodland and the climbing wall.

- Location within Surrey

General information
- Location: High Ashurst Outdoor Education Centre, Headley Lane, Mickleham, Dorking, Surrey RH5 6DQ, United Kingdom
- Coordinates: 51.264304°N 0.291695°W
- Owner: Surrey Outdoor Learning & Development

Website
- www.surreyoutdoorlearning.uk/facilities/high-ashurst

High Ashurst is a large natural site of 56 acres of land in an Area of Outstanding Natural Beauty in North Downs, Surrey. The site has been host to many different people and organisations over the years, but is now a place prized for its outdoor learning opportunities.

== History ==
The High Ashurst estate has a history dating back to 1706, where the earliest records of the site refer to it as ‘High Ashes Farm’.

A number of notable figures have lived at the estate since it was expanded, including the King's Printer Andrew Strahan during the Georgian period, and subsequently his nephew William Snow, whose poor money management lead to the estate being lost to him and instead acquired by a banker, Sir Henry Muggeridge in 1855.

After being owned by a James Christopher Wilson (who is thought to have been a dealer of gunpowder), High Ashurst came into possession of Henry Ryder, 4th Earl of Harrowby in 1882, who was an Earl-in-waiting at the time. Ryder had to wait another 18 years before inheriting the title of earl for himself; his ascension did not last long, however, as he fell overboard his personal steam yacht off the coast of Algeria in 1900, just nine months after finally becoming the 4th Earl of Harrowby.

Ryder's widow remained at the estate until her death in 1913, while two of her daughters also stayed until 1918. The estate was eventually put up for sale in 1921, and the estate's original size of over 1,200 acres of land was reduced to just 56 acres by 1922.

The on-site mansion house renovated by the Earl was converted to lodgings for the Young Women's Christian Association (YWCA) until 1924, and then became a boarding school (renamed Wentworth Hall) in 1937.

The Second World War saw the estate used as a base for Canadian military personnel, including the Royal Canadian Engineers, but once the war was over the house fell into disuse and its demolition was ordered by Surrey County Council between 1961–73.

== Present ==
Today, High Ashurst serves as an outdoor education centre managed by Surrey Outdoor Learning and Development (SOLD), which offers an array of outdoor learning courses for both adults and children. In addition to this it now serves as venue for TAZ (The Adventure Zone) summer holiday day camp.

Various activities can be undertaken by visitors to the site aged 8 and up, including archery, adventure walks, challenge courses, climbing, abseiling, high ropes courses, mountain biking, orienteering, team tasks, and woodland skills.

Facilities for both short and long stay terms are available, and High Ashurst offers a number of deluxe cabins (including Pinnacle, which caters specifically for those with high mobility requirements and special educational needs), as well as camping grounds and Teepee villages are available for those who want to experience ‘the great outdoors’. Various meeting rooms are also available and catering options can be found on site.
