= Mole Gap to Reigate Escarpment =

Site of special biological and geographical interest in Surrey

Coordinates: 51.260°N 0.290°W

- Site of Special Scientific Interest
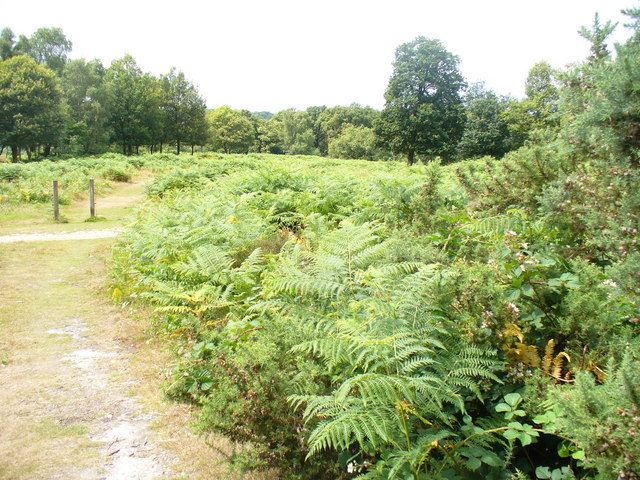
- Headley Heath
- Location of Mole Gap to Reigate Escarpment.
- Area of search: Surrey
- Grid reference: TQ 194 526
- Interest: Biological; Geological
- Area: 1,016.4 hectares (2,512 acres)
- Notification date: 1986
- Location map: Magic Map

Mole Gap to Reigate Escarpment is a 1,016.4-hectare (2,512-acre) biological and geological Site of Special Scientific Interest west of Reigate in Surrey. It is a Geological Conservation Review site and a Special Area of Conservation. Part of it is a Nature Conservation Review site, Grade I. Two small private nature reserves in the site are managed by the Surrey Wildlife Trust, Dawcombe and Fraser Down.

This eight mile long site on the North Downs contains an outstanding range of wildlife habitats, including large areas of woodland and chalk grassland. Mole Gap has a variety of Quaternary landforms and there are well developed river cliffs where alluvial fans have diverted the River Mole against the valley sides. Some of the chalk grassland is CG2 sheep's fescue - meadow oatgrass community, which is one of the most species-rich types of grazing pasture found in Britain, but the SAC is also designated for CG3, CG4, CG5 and CG6 grassland types.
