= Westhumble =

Village in Surrey, England

Coordinates: 51°15′14″N 0°19′59″W

- Village
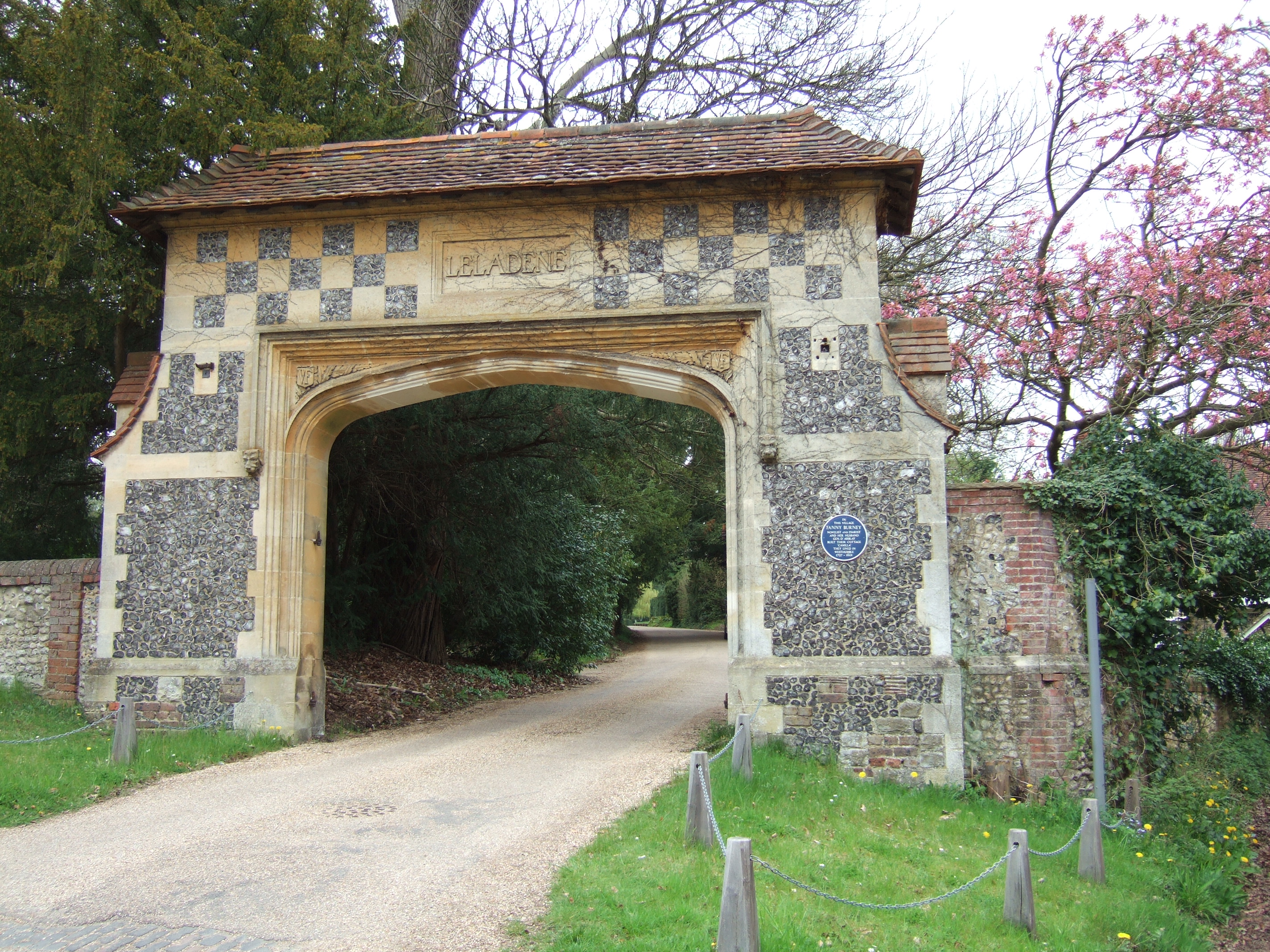
- Arch leading to Camilla Drive

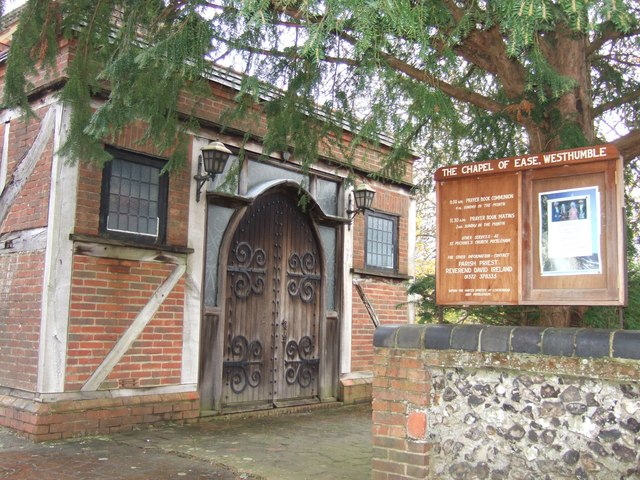
- Chapel of Ease

- Location within Surrey
- Area: 2.86 km^{2} (1.10 sq mi)
- Population: 649 (2011 census)
  - Density: 227/km^{2} (590/sq mi)
- OS grid reference: TQ1652
- Civil parish: n/a
- District: Mole Valley
- Shire county: Surrey
- Region: South East
- Country: England
- Sovereign state: United Kingdom
- Post town: Dorking
- Postcode district: RH5
- Dialling code: 01306
- Police: Surrey
- Fire: Surrey
- Ambulance: South East Coast
- UK Parliament: Dorking and Horley

Westhumble /wɛstˈhʌmbəl/ is a village in south east England, approximately 2 km (1.2 mi) north of Dorking, Surrey. The village is not part of a civil parish, however the majority of the settlement is in the ecclesiastical Parish of Mickleham.

The area is served by Box Hill & Westhumble railway station.

Norbury Park (managed by Surrey Wildlife Trust) is immediately to the north and there are several National Trust properties nearby, including Box Hill and Polesden Lacey. The Mole Gap Trail runs through the village, crossing the North Downs Way less than 0.40 km (0.25 mi) to the south.

The railway station is the southern terminus of the Thames Down Link walking route from Kingston upon Thames.

== History ==
The earliest archaeological evidence for human activity in the village is a large axe, typical of a "rough-out" axe produced during the Neolithic period, which was discovered in 1952 during building work in Burney Road. The discovery of a Flint Mine at East Horsley and flakes of flint found at Fetcham and Headley Heath of the same period, suggest that this part of the North Downs had been settled by the late Stone Age (10 000–3000 BC).

The earliest mention of the 'village' (it is more accurately a chapelry or 'hamlet') is in the Assizes Rolls of 1248, in which it appears as Wystumble. The name is thought to derive from the Old English wice meaning wych elm and the Middle English stumbel meaning tree stump. The village is not explicitly mentioned in the Domesday Book of 1086, however there are two separate entries for the Parish of Mickleham, in which much of the village is located, and it is probable that the second of these refers to Westhumble. The medieval village was centred on the present-day midpoint of Adlers Lane with gently sloping fields to the north and south. The identity of the manor house is unclear, however there are repeated references to Hadlers Hall and later Audlers Hole in the Court Roll records. It has been suggested that the hall was the original manor house. There is no trace of the house today.

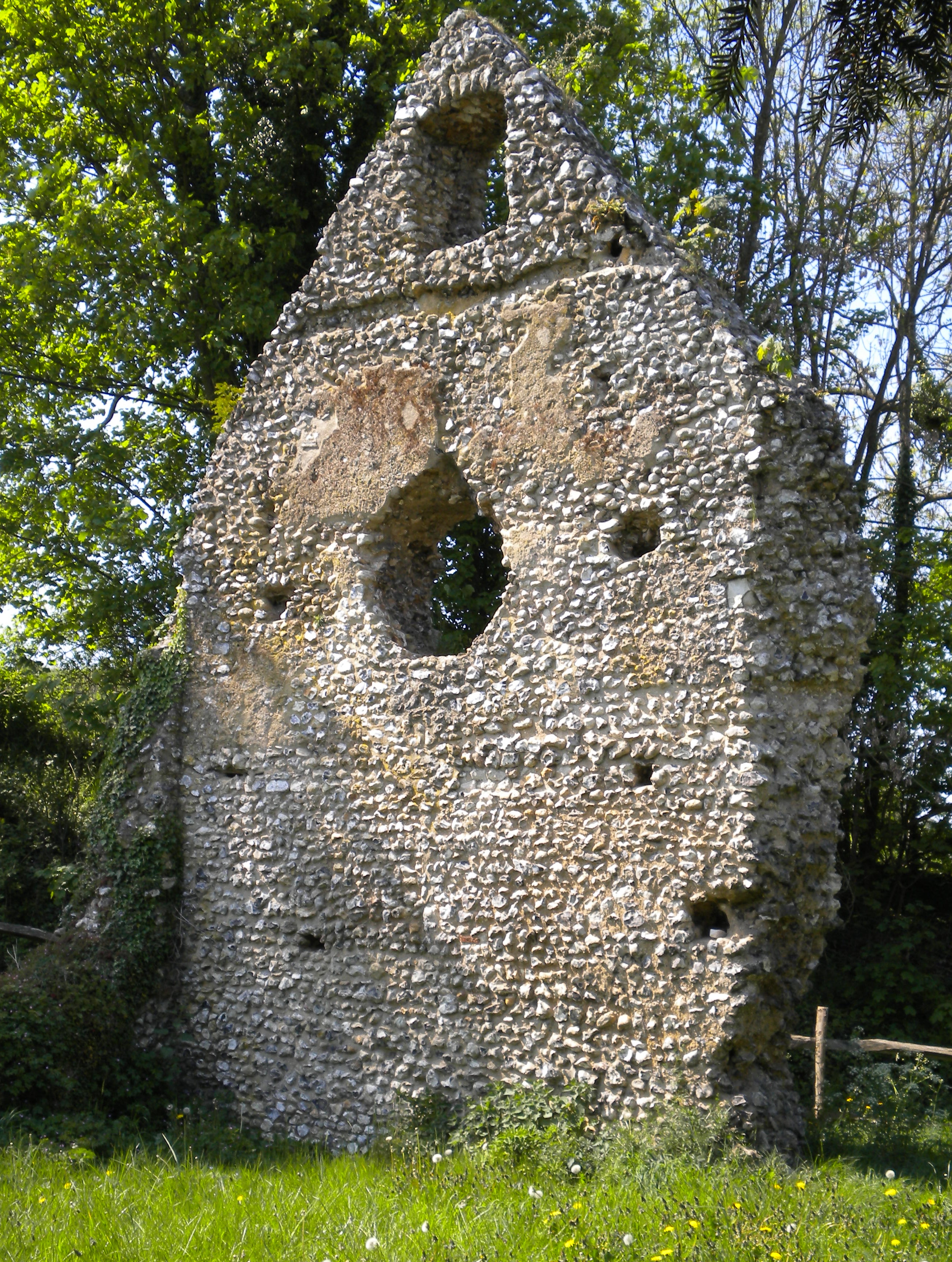
Westhumble Chapel, ruins of the west gable

The oldest building is the ruined chapel at the extreme west end of the village, of which only the west gable and parts of the east end remain. The chapel was probably not part of the medieval manor of Westhumble, but was located in the manor of Polesden (centred on Chapel Farm, which is of medieval origin). Reference is made in the Surrey Feet of Fines during the reign of King John 1199–1216 to "Adam the canon in Fecham and Polesdene" a subordinate of the Prior of Merton and it is probable that the chapel was the responsibility of this Canon. The chapel is thought to have been built during the late twelfth or early thirteenth century for the use of villagers, particularly when floods prevented them from reaching the Parish Church in Mickleham. Six skeletons were found during an archaeological survey in 1937 and the manner in which they were interred suggests that they were ordinary local burials. Clay cooking pots and jugs dating from around 1300 and a silver penny dating from 1544–1547 during the reign of Henry VIII were also found on the site. The chapel was probably abandoned as a place of worship during the mid-sixteenth century, although part of it was probably used as a farm outbuilding for some time. Repairs to the remaining walls were carried out during 1938 and the site is now owned by the National Trust.

Much of the early history of the village is uncertain, because the manorial records were deliberately destroyed by fire in 1776. During the late Middle Ages and Early Modern periods, it would appear that the focal point of the village shifted half a mile eastwards from Adlers Lane to Westhumble Street. The shift in position may have reflected the growing importance of the north-south road through the Mole Gap and the relative decrease in importance of the east-west route along the North Downs. Although the turnpike through the valley was not completed until 1755, the route was regularly being used to transport goods including charcoal and poultry to Kingston and London by the 14th century. For much of the winter the ford across the River Mole would have been impassable and so a secondary route on higher ground along the western side of the valley was used, of which Westhumble Street formed the southernmost part. The name Westhumble Street is first recorded in 1736 (some 19 years before the construction of the turnpike) and the use of the word street in the context of a village of this period, suggests that the road surface was improved with metalling. It seems likely that the villagers sought to take advantage of the passing trade and the movement of the village centre was confirmed with the construction of the new manor house, Camilla Lacey, north of Chapel Lane in 1816.

Much of the modern village dates from the two decades following the break-up and sale of the Camilla Lacey estate in 1932 following the death of the owner Victor Freeman. By the outbreak of World War II, most of the houses in Pilgrims Way had been built although those in Burney Road, Adlers Lane and Pilgrims Close were not constructed until the late 1940s.

== Demography and housing ==
2011 Census Homes
Output area	Detached	Semi-detached	Terraced	Flats and apartments	Caravans/temporary/mobile homes/houseboats	Shared between households
E00155845	110	15	5	2	0	0
E00155847	73	21	21	21	0	0

The average level of accommodation in the region composed of detached houses was 28%, the average that was apartments was 22.6%.

2011 Census Households
Output area	Population	Households	% Owned outright	% Owned with a loan	hectares
E00155845	344	132	52.3	40.2	200
E00155847	305	136	50.7	33.1	86
Regional average			35.1	32.5	

The proportion of households who owned their home outright compares to the regional average of 35.1%. The proportion who owned their home with a loan compares to the regional average of 32.5%. The remaining % is made up of rented dwellings (plus a negligible % of households living rent-free).

== Transport ==
=== Buses ===
London Buses route 465 from Dorking to Kingston passes by a stop for the Box Hill roundabout. Its service is half-hourly until the later evening when it is hourly.

=== Trains ===
Box Hill & Westhumble railway station, in the centre of the village, is on the Mole Valley Line between Leatherhead and Dorking. The station is served by both Southern and South Western Railway, who run services to London Victoria and London Waterloo respectively.

=== Cycling ===
Beside the A24 dual carriageway, following the Mole, from here south is a wide NCN standard cycle path (marked and less used by pedestrians): south and northeast of the Box Hill roundabout this is route 22 from south London to Alton, Hampshire; north this is designated Surrey Cycle route 5 with wide roads into Leatherhead or for the western A246 turn off towards Great Bookham and Guildford.

West through the village and up into the hills including Ranmore Common to Guildford is one of a choice of rural routes in the Surrey Cycleway.

The 2012 Summer Olympics road races started at The Mall in central London, extended into Surrey to the south via Weybridge, Ripley and Dorking then took the A24 next to the NCN cycling path at the foot of the village to return to The Mall via Leatherhead, Oxshott, Hampton Court Palace and Kingston-upon-Thames.

=== Roads ===
The village is immediately west of the dual A24 between Dorking and Leatherhead with easy access after those towns to the M25 motorway, outer parts of London and Brighton to the south, and before Leatherhead taking the A243 to Guildford.

== Local government ==
The area forms just under a third in terms of population of one of the wards of the United Kingdom Mickleham, Westhumble and Pixham that had in 2011 a total population of 1,932. and has the right to elect two councillors to Mole Valley Borough Council.

== Famous residents ==
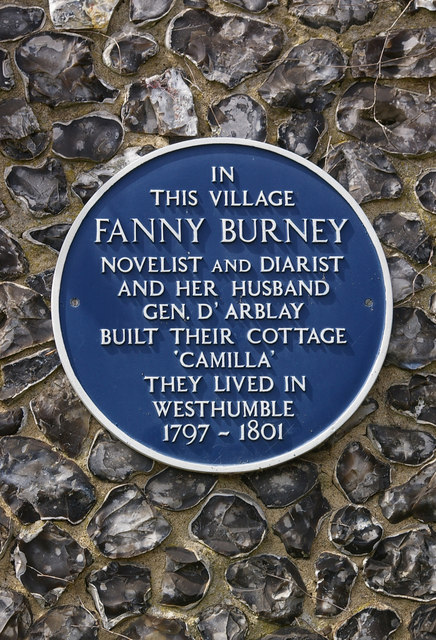
Blue Plaque on Leladene Arch at the entrance to Camilla Drive

Fanny Burney, the 18th-century novelist, built a house in the village in 1797 with her husband, the French general, Alexandre D'Arblay.

The detective story writer Cyril Hare was born in Mickleham in 1900 and lived from 1951 until his death in 1958 in Westhumble, at Berry's Croft opposite Cleveland Lodge. As Judge A. A. Gordon Clark he sat in Dorking county court among others.

The physicist and astronomer Sir James Jeans and his wife, the organist Susi Jeans, lived at Cleveland Lodge. Susi Jeans hosted an annual music festival at Cleveland Lodge from 1954; initially known as the Mickleham and Westhumble Festival, it was renamed the Boxhill Music Festival in 1966. The final festival was held in June 1992 a few months before her death in January 1993.
