= Ashtead Common =

Woodland area in Surrey, England

Coordinates: 51.323°N 0.320°W

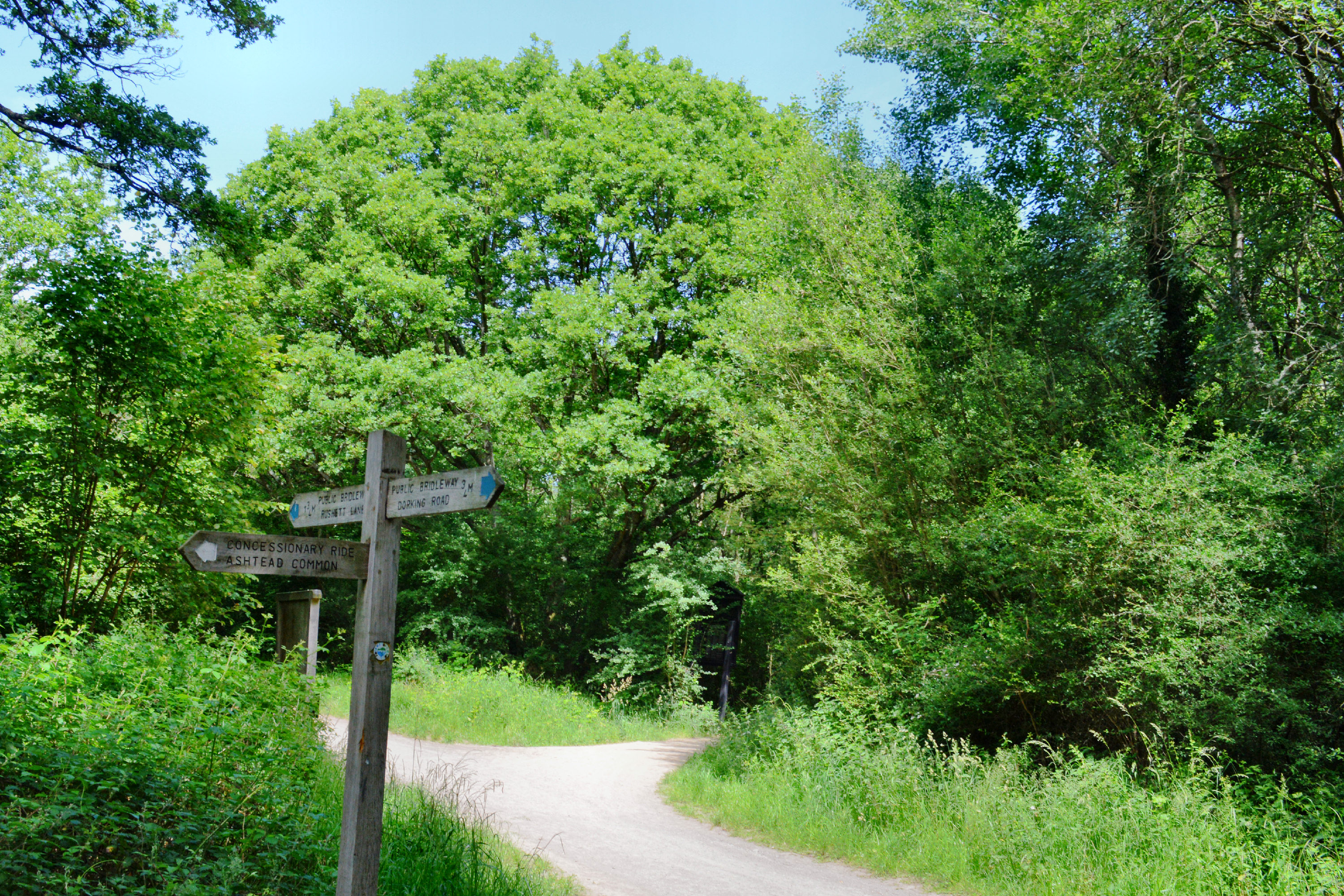
Thames Downs Link path at junction with Epsom Common

Ashtead Common, nearly 495 acres (c. 200 ha), is a wooded area open to the public, to the north of the village of Ashtead in Surrey, England. It is owned and managed by the City of London Corporation, after being bought by the City due to concern in the 1870s that access to the open countryside around London was being threatened. 180.5 ha of the common is a National Nature Reserve. Together with Epsom Common it forms part of a larger area of open countryside called Epsom and Ashtead Commons, which is designated a Site of Special Scientific Interest (SSSI).

== Background ==
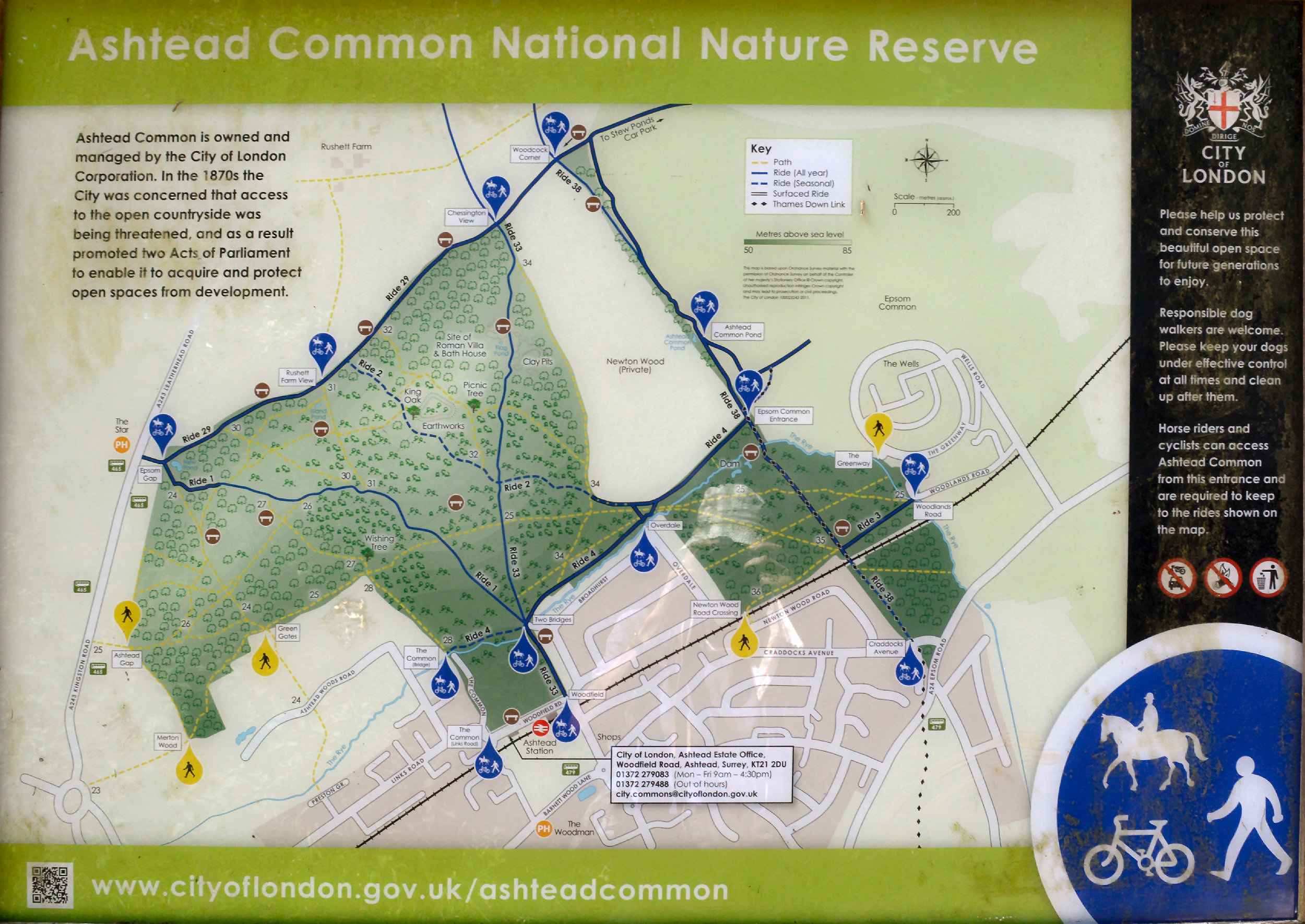
Information board map

Ashtead Common has been part of the Epsom and Ashtead Commons SSSI since 1955 due to its community of breeding birds. It has also been a National Nature Reserve since 1995 because of the wood of decaying ancient trees and the rare invertebrates that live in it. It contains a wooded common with over 2,300 pollarded oaks, between 300 and 400 years old. These provide a habitat for many rare and endangered deadwood species. The area is of conservation interest in Britain and Europe. Also within the common are bracken, scrub grassland, semi-improved neutral grassland and various aquatic habitats.

Trials have been undertaken on how to deal with the invasion of Michaelmas daisies. It was concluded that grazing by goats was the most successful management option.

There are remains of a Roman villa and tile works on the common. These are scheduled ancient monuments. There are also some earthworks.

When the Southern Railway planned to build a new line to connect Chessington South railway station with Leatherhead railway station in the 1930s, work was delayed by the outbreak of the Second World War, and afterwards the introduction of the "Green Belt" stopped development of the area. Part of the land reserved for the railway to the south of Ashtead Wood was subsequently used for the construction of the M25 motorway.

== Access ==
Ashtead Common, together with Epsom Common, extends from the M25 Junction 9 near Leatherhead to the outskirts of Epsom. There are many entrances to the common for walkers, including in north Ashtead and Epsom.

The Thames Down Link long-distance footpath, from Kingston upon Thames to Box Hill and Westhumble station, cuts across the western half of the common.
