= Susi Jeans =

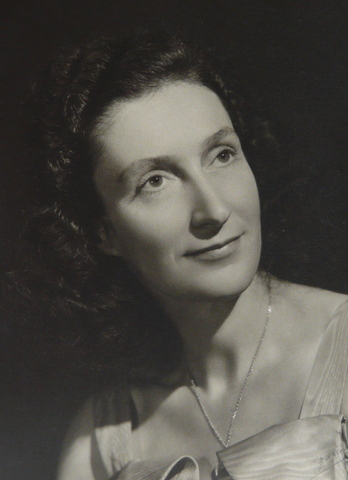

Background information
- Also known as: Lady Jeans; Susanne Jeans
- Born: Susanne Hock; 25 January 1911; Vienna, Austria
- Died: 7 January 1993 (aged 81) Westhumble, Surrey, England
- Occupations: Organist, teacher, musicologist
- Spouse(s): Sir James Jeans (m. 1935); 3 children

Susi, Lady Jeans (née Susanne Hock; 25 January 1911 – 7 January 1993) was an Austrian-born professional organist, teacher and musicologist.

== Personal life and education ==
Born in Vienna, she was the oldest child of Oskar and Jekaterina Hock. She was of Jewish descent through her father. She trained as a ballet dancer by the modernist teacher Gertrud Bodenwieser but growing rather rapidly, switched to the piano.

From 1925 to 1931, she studied piano at the Vienna Conservatory, with organ as a second study. This became her first instrument from about 1928, when she began studies with the composer Franz Schmidt and the organist Franz Schütz. In 1931, she was heard by the organist and composer Charles-Marie Widor. After criticising her pedal technique, which he thought not legato enough, Widor invited her to become a student. She accepted his offer but did not report on his lessons' effects other than to say that he was a very old man at the time.

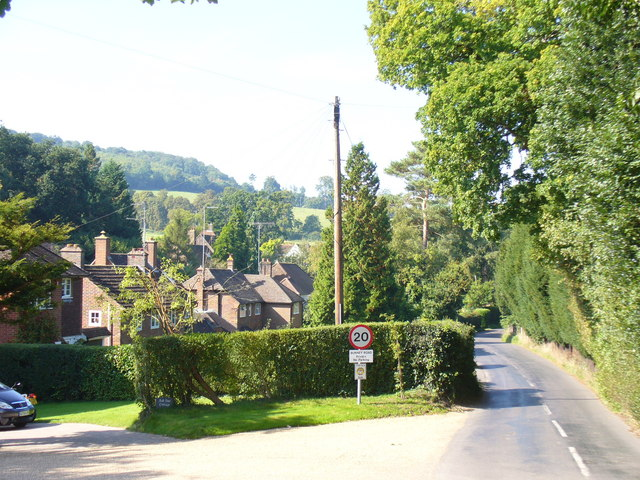
The hillside hamlet of Westhumble became an influential UK keyboard instrument teaching centre at her large, now demolished house, Cleveland Lodge

During her 1934-35 tour she met the astronomer and mathematician Sir James Jeans just over 32 years her senior, whom she married, in Vienna, in September 1935. They lived together in a large house (replaced at the end of the century by Cleveland Court) 'Cleveland Lodge' next to Box Hill & Westhumble railway station in Westhumble, Surrey having three children before his death in 1946. Lady Jeans continued to live at the house until she died in 1993.

== Career ==
Between 1933 and 1935, she studied intermittently at the Leipzig Kirchenmusikalisches Institut with Karl Straube during which time Jeans acquired knowledge of period instruments, forming her specialisation. Jeans advocated, amongst other theories, that the trio sonatas by J S Bach were conceived with the pedal harpsichord as the larger instrument of the three involved, rather than the organ, Jeans bought a two manual and pedal harpsichord by Maendler-Schramm of Munich. In ensuing years, she was to make many broadcasts from this instrument and the study organ.

Before marriage, the enlarged marital home, Cleveland Lodge had assembled a large three-manual Willis II organ in a specially-built concert hall. In 1937 this was supplemented by a new mechanical action organ, built into her study by Eule of Bautzen although she later represented it was installed by Hill, Norman and Beard It was the first neo-Classical organ built in Britain in the 20th century.

Her first concert tour in Britain, in 1934, was a great success and the following year she returned to play at the Handel Festival in Cambridge. Jeans founded the Mickleham and Westhumble Festival in 1954, which was renamed the Boxhill Music Festival in 1966 and subsequently held at Cleveland Lodge until the summer before her death.

Susi Jeans' concert tours took her throughout Europe, the United States and Western Australia. She adjudicated major international competitions and from 1967 held a post at the University of Colorado. She championed informed performances and authentic restoration and use of harpsichords, clavichords and organs. Jeans approved of many modern composers from German-speaking countries including her teacher, Franz Schmidt and played works dedicated to her by such composers as Augustinus Franz Kropfreiter (Toccata Francese) and Hendrik Andriessen (Thema met Varieties, written at Cleveland Lodge). Jeans was a recreational player and public exponent of the clavichord. She performed early and contemporary works on her favourite clavichord, a single-strung instrument by Thomas Goff and maintained that "clavichord technique is the backbone of all keyboard playing, whether this be organ, piano or harpsichord."

=== Other interests ===
- William Herschel who shared her husband's profession
- Skiing and mountaineering: she climbed the Matterhorn twice
- Natural medicine and performance nutrition. She advocated vitamin pills especially Vitamin B12 'for co-ordination' and Vitamin D 'for nerves'.

=== Publications ===
She published many articles in scholarly journals, as well as editions of scores.

=== Pupils and influences ===
Her range of musician pupils included:

- George Guest
- Peter Hurford
- David Lumsden
- Ralph Cupper
- Tim Rishton
- David Sanger
- Davitt Moroney

Jeans bequeathed her house to the Royal School of Church Music for a centre for musicians and it was itself restored and modified using National Lottery money. However the Royal School of Church Music relocated and concentrated its site on Sarum College and it was sold to property developers to raise further charitable funds.
