= Kingston Bridge, London =

Kingston Bridge
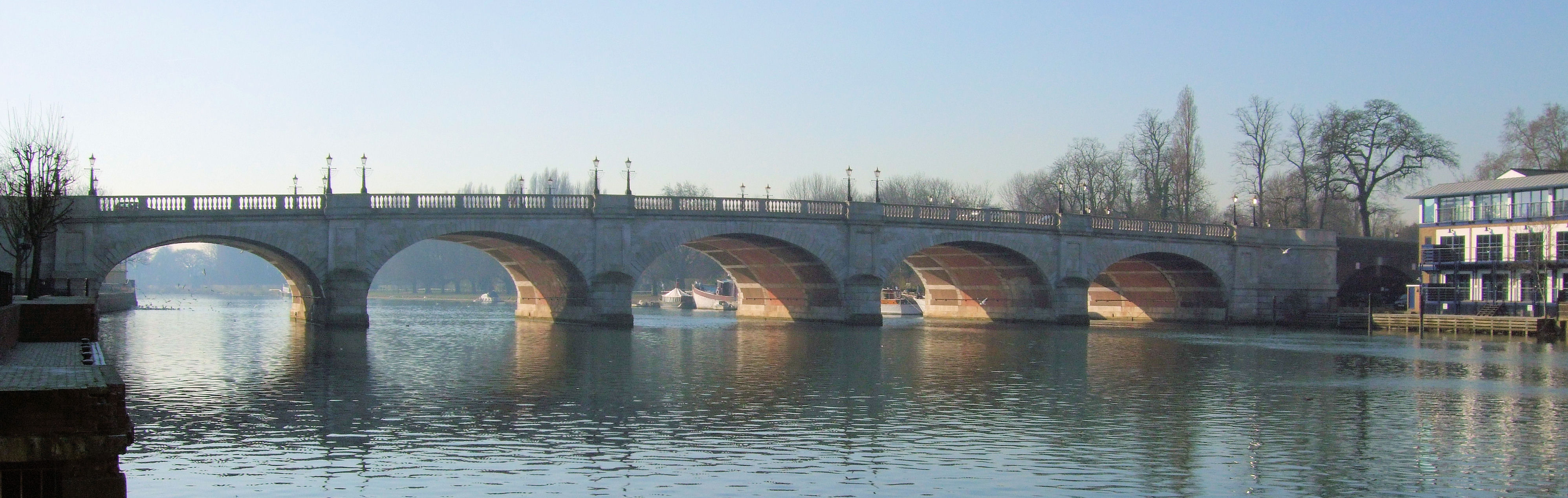
- Kingston Bridge from downstream at Kingston
- Coordinates: 51°24′40″N 0°18′32″W
- Carries: A308 road, Thames Path
- Crosses: River Thames
- Locale: Kingston upon Thames
- Maintained by: Kingston upon Thames London Borough Council

Characteristics
- Design: Arch
- Material: Stone
- Total length: 382 feet 0 inches (116.43 m)
- Width: 79 feet 0 inches (24.08 m)
- Height: 23 feet 11 inches (7.29 m)
- Longest span: 60 feet 0 inches (18.29 m)
- No. of spans: 5
- Piers in water: 4

History
- Designer: Edward Lapidge
- Opened: 17 July 1828

Statistics
- Daily traffic: 50,000 vehicles
- Toll: Abolished 1870

Listed Building – Grade II*
- Official name: Kingston Bridge
- Designated: 30 July 1951
- Reference no.: 1300232

Kingston Bridge is a road bridge at Kingston upon Thames in south west London, England, carrying the A308 across the River Thames. It joins the town centre of Kingston in the Royal Borough of Kingston upon Thames to Hampton Court Park, Bushy Park, and the village of Hampton Wick in the London Borough of Richmond upon Thames. In 2005 it was carrying approximately 50,000 vehicles per day with up to 2,000 vehicles per hour in each direction during peak times.

For several centuries, Kingston bridge was the only crossing of the River Thames other than London Bridge within the modern Greater London boundary.

Kingston Bridge is on the reach above Teddington Lock and close to and downstream of the mouth of the Hogsmill River, a minor tributary of the Thames. The Thames Path crosses the river here and the bridge is the end point for the Thames Down Link long-distance footpath from Box Hill & Westhumble station.

== History ==
Until Putney Bridge was opened in 1729, Kingston Bridge was the only crossing of the river between London Bridge and Staines Bridge.

According to 16th-century antiquarian John Leland, the bridge existed in the centuries when Anglo-Saxon England existed (after Roman Britain and before 1066). He wrote "And yn the old tyme the commune saying ys that the bridge where the commun passage was over the Tamise was lower on the ryver then it is now. And when men began the new town in the Saxons tymes they toke from the very clive of Comeparke [cliff of Coombe Park] side to build on the Tamise side; and sette a new bridge hard by the same." Other sources claim that the first Kingston Bridge was constructed in the 1190s.

Leland refers to a contemporary bridge and to an older wooden bridge that had existed at Kingston since the 13th century. This was about 100 feet downstream of the present bridge: Old Bridge Street at Hampton Wick used to be matched by an Old Bridge Street on the Kingston side. In 1318 the bridge was described as being in a dangerous condition. The successive bridges contributed greatly to Kingston's success as a medieval market town.

Destroying or defending the few bridges of the Thames gave power – having no nearby bridges would particularly hinder mounted armies. The mediaeval timber bridge fell victim to destructions during the Wars of the Roses and Wyatt's rebellion. There are records of tolls being granted for various spells to pay for repairs to the bridge, but in 1567, Robert Hamond gave a sum to make it a free bridge 'forever'. However, in spite of his endowments, for some years in the 18th century certain tolls were reimposed under the authority of the mayor and aldermen of the borough. The bridge was described in 1710 "The great Wooden Bridge hath 20 interstices: (Note: Interstices, also known as spans, are colloquially and, where arched, called arches.) two in the middle wide enough for barges...it had 22 pierres [piers] of Wood and had in the middle two fair Seates for Passengers to avoid Carts and to sit and enjoy the delightfull Prospect".

The bridge's state of repair became increasingly problematic by the early 19th century. It had become increasingly dilapidated and its narrowness made passage difficult both for river and road traffic. Pressure mounted for it to be rebuilt but no agreement could be reached on who would be responsible or who would pay for it. The courts became involved in 1813 but were overtaken by events in January 1814, when part of the bridge collapsed due to a severe frost. The court ordered Kingston to repair the bridge from its own resources but a complete replacement was by that time clearly necessary.

=== 1828 bridge ===
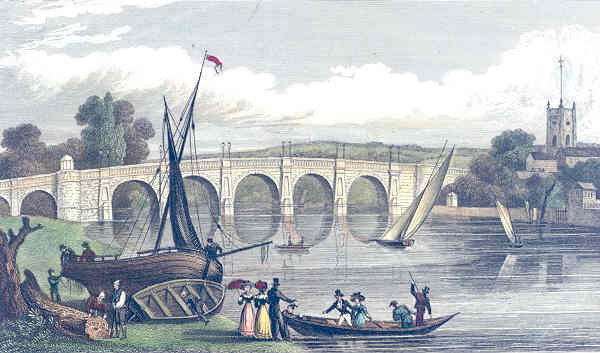
A view of Kingston Bridge published in 1831. It has been widened twice since then.

In 1825 Kingston Corporation notified the City of London Corporation Navigation Committee that it intended to build a new bridge. An act of Parliament, the Kingston-upon-Thames Bridge Act 1825 (6 Geo. 4. c. cxxv) was passed in the same year to authorise construction. The corporation planned to erect a cast-iron bridge, and an architectural competition was held with a prize of 100 guineas. The winner was John Burges Watson, with a design for a bridge of three equal arches. However, concerns over the rising cost of iron led to the abandonment of the scheme, and it was decided instead to build a stone bridge in the classical style to a design by Edward Lapidge, the county surveyor. The first stone was laid by the Earl of Liverpool at a ceremony on 7 November 1825 and the bridge was opened by the Duchess of Clarence (the future Queen Adelaide) on 17 July 1828. The approach road to the east was named Clarence Street in her honour. The remains of the original Kingston Bridge are now housed in Kingston's new multi-arts venue, FUSEBOX.

The new bridge, about 100 feet (30 m) upstream from its predecessor, was built of Portland stone: comprising five elliptical arches. The centre arch enclosed a 60 foot (18 m) span, 19 feet (5.8 m) in height, and the side arches 56 feet (17 m) then 52 feet (16 m) in span progressively from the centre. The abutments were terminated by towers or bastions, and the whole surmounted by a cornice and balustrade, with galleries projecting over the pier; which gave a bold relief to the general elevation. The length of the bridge was 382 feet (116 m) by 27 feet (8.2 m) in width. The building contract was undertaken by Herbert for £26,800 (equivalent to £2,778,656 in 2023), and extra work did not exceed £100, a rare occurrence in major public or private undertakings of that description at the time.

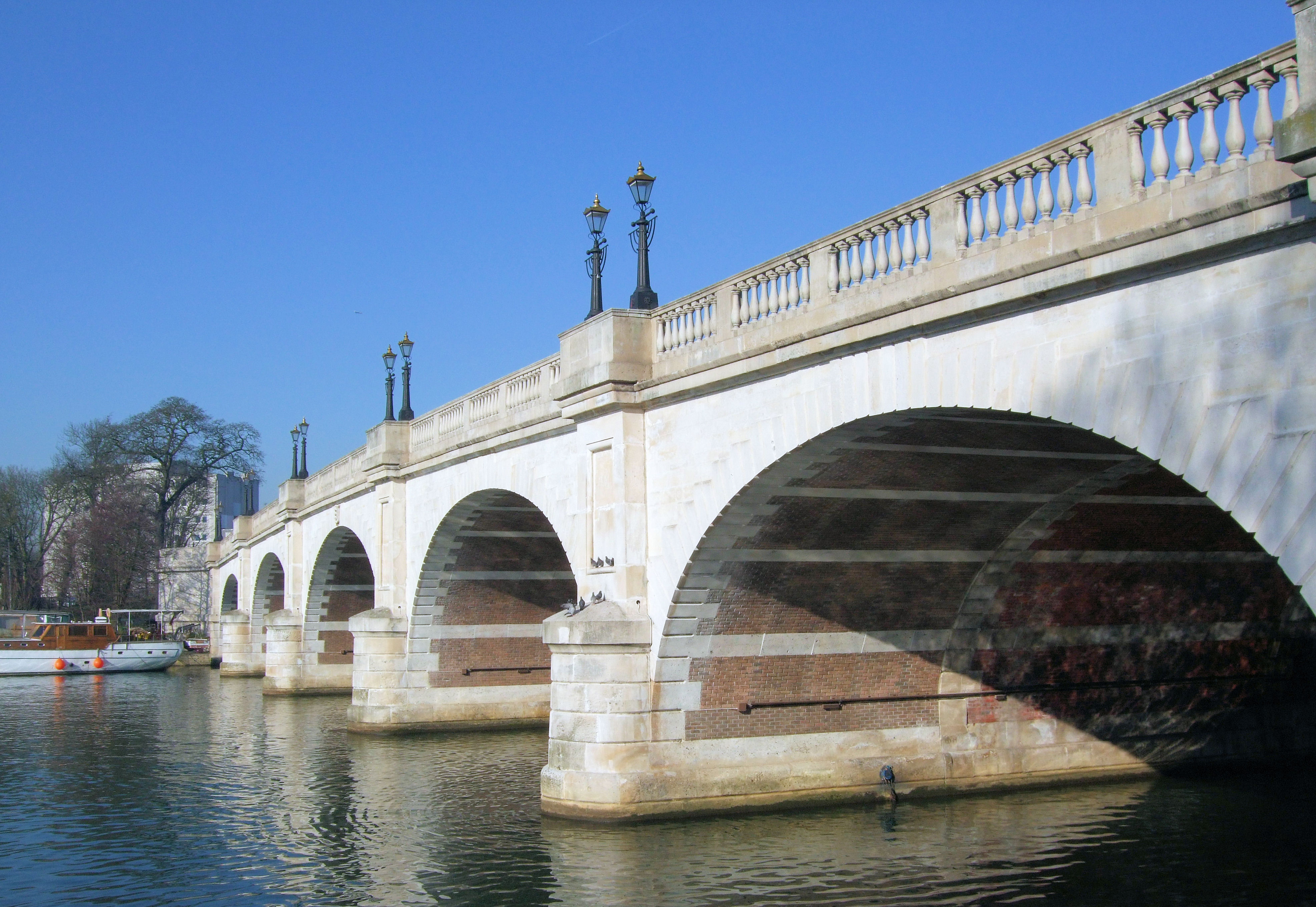
Kingston Bridge on the upstream side

Following a lengthy campaign which came to a conclusion with the passing of the Kew and Other Bridges Act 1869 (32 & 33 Vict. c. xix), the bridge became free from tolls on 12 March 1870, and celebrations including a fireworks show were followed a few days later with the burning of the toll gates on Hampton Green. In March 1906, London United Tramways installed tramlines on Kingston Bridge, connecting the Surrey and Middlesex routes. The increase in traffic and the narrowness of the road became a problem and in 1911 the engineering firm Mott & Hay was contracted to widen the bridge on the downstream side. The work was undertaken between 1912 and 1914 with the carriageway increased from 25 feet (7.6 m) to 55 feet (17 m). A new façade of Portland stone was designed to replicate the features of the original. The bridge was reopened in October 1914. In 1931, the trams were replaced by trolleybuses - before these were replaced by diesel buses in 1962. Following construction of the Kingston Relief Road in the late 1980s, the bridge was widened again in 2000 to include two cycle lanes, larger pavements and a bus lane, from 55 feet (17 m) to 79 feet (24 m).

The bridge was given protection as a Grade II* listed structure in 1951.

== See also ==
- Kingston Railway Bridge
- List of crossings of the River Thames
- List of bridges in London

== Notes ==
Next crossing upstream	River Thames	Next crossing downstream
Hampton Court Bridge (road)	Kingston Bridge, London; Grid reference TQ177693	Kingston Railway Bridge (rail)
Next crossing upstream	Thames Path	Next crossing downstream
northern bank Hampton Court Bridge	Kingston Bridge, London	southern bank Teddington Lock Footbridge
