= Rishton (disambiguation) =

Rishton may refer to:

Places

- Rishton, a town in Lancashire, England
- Rishton, Uzbekistan, a town in the Fergana Valley, Uzbekistan

People

- Edward Rishton
- John Rishton, CEO of the Dutch company Ahold
- Tim Rishton, musician
