= Headley, Surrey =

Village and parish in Surrey, England

Coordinates: 51.277°N 0.271°W

Headley
- St Mary's Church, Headley

- Headley Heath

- Location within Surrey
- Area: 6.75 km^{2} (2.61 sq mi)
- Population: 643 (Civil Parish 2011)
  - Density: 95/km^{2} (250/sq mi)
- OS grid reference: TQ205545
- Civil parish: Headley
- District: Mole Valley
- Shire county: Surrey
- Region: South East
- Country: England
- Sovereign state: United Kingdom
- Post town: Epsom
- Postcode district: KT18
- Dialling code: 01372
- Police: Surrey
- Fire: Surrey
- Ambulance: South East Coast
- UK Parliament: Dorking and Horley

Headley is a village and civil parish in the North Downs in Surrey, England. The nearest settlements are, to the west, Mickleham and Leatherhead; to the north, Ashtead and Langley Vale; to the east, Walton-on-the-Hill; and to the south, Box Hill. It is just outside the M25 motorway encircling London.

Headley is particularly known for its Heath, which has been under the care of the National Trust since 1946.

== History ==
The Romans had an influence nearby, with the Roman Road to Noviomagus Reginorum, called by the Saxons Stane Street, some 2 km from the village, and a considerable Roman presence in the neighbouring village of Walton-on-the-Hill, with its scheduled ancient monument villa and other finds.

Headley's land lay in the Saxons' Copthorne Hundred. As Saxon records are scant and the church and population were smaller, no church in Headley is known to have existed during this period; the first records of a church date after the Norman Conquest. Next to the present 19th-century church is a grotto, constructed using materials from the earlier 15th-century church and placed over the grave of the Revd Ferdinand Faithful.

Headley appears in the Domesday Book of 1086 as the manor of Hallega. Radulfus (Ralph) de Felgeres held it. Its domesday assets were: 2 hides; 6 ploughs, woodland worth 15 hogs. It rendered £5 per year to its overlords. The survey records that the manor was held before the conquest by Countess Goda, who had granted it to her by her brother, King Edward the Confessor. Halle(g)a means a clearing in the heather, which is appropriate considering the village's position on a large patch of acidic topsoil of the generally alkaline North Downs.

=== St Mary's Church ===
The church, dedicated to St Mary and designed by Anthony Salvin, was built in 1855, with an added tower of 1859 by G. E. Street. It is built from relatively local flint rubble and is listed as Grade II. The triptych (1895) on the altar is by Charles Edgar Buckeridge.

St Mary's, Headley

St Mary's from its churchyard

The Buckeridge triptych at the altar of St. Mary's

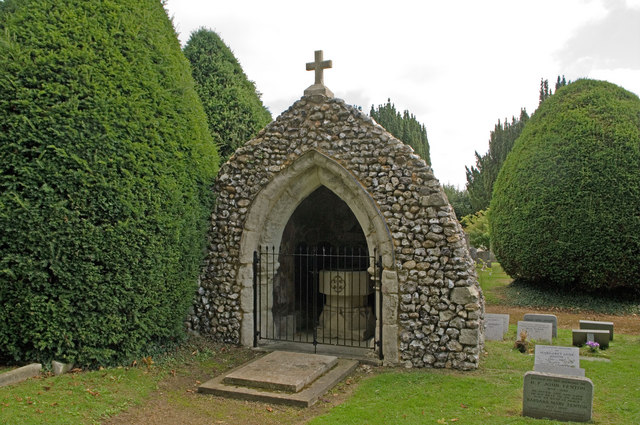
The grotto

War Memorial

=== Headley Court ===
Walter Cunliffe, later 1st Baron Cunliffe and the Governor of the Bank of England, was given the original farmhouse estate, formerly the main manor, and its remaining 300 acres (1.2 km^{2}), Headley Court, in 1880 by his father on the condition that he would make a career in banking rather than become a farmer. He redeveloped it in 1898. The family fortune had been made by Walter's grandfather, James Cunliffe, through his development of the North Eastern Railway.

Following the Cunliffes, Headley Court became a military hospital (originally an RAF Hospital). Its playing fields can be used for helicopters. This unit closed in September 2018, and the site was bought for redevelopment in May 2019 by Angle Property.

Headley Court, 1898

== Land use and Headley Heath ==
There has been little new housing built in the late 20th century and early 21st century, as the village is part of the London Green Belt and the Surrey Hills Area of Outstanding Natural Beauty. Substantially, the steep and quick-draining land is covered by woods. A large minority of the field land in the village is used primarily for grazing by the many riding establishments in the area. Headley Heath is managed by the National Trust, and other nearby areas are controlled by the Surrey Wildlife Trust and other nature reserves. The heath is part of the Mole Gap to Reigate Escarpment Site of Special Scientific Interest.

== Economy ==
Most of the population works outside the village, with care and rehabilitation, maintenance, extension work, equestrian work and agriculture being the main categories of work within the village.

== Amenities ==
The village has an active church, shop, village hall and pub.

County-supported schools are in Leatherhead, Ashtead, Mickleham and Dorking. Some children attend private schools.

Headley is known for its large heath lands, which are owned by the National Trust, leading out towards Box Hill. Canadian troops used the Health during World War II as a tank and combat training ground.

=== Transport ===
A typically two-hourly bus service (number 21) between Crawley and Epsom connects Headley to Box Hill, Dorking and Leatherhead. A service was provided by Surrey County Council for local children aged 5–11 years, to primary schools, which terminated on 1 September 2006.

A bus service is also provided by St. Andrew's Catholic School, Leatherhead, for its pupils (aged 11 to 18).

The nearest station by road is Betchworth, which is served by trains to Redhill, Guildford and Reading. Box Hill & Westhumble station, which has trains to London Victoria and London Waterloo, is also nearby.

In March 1969 the village was told that the proposed M25 motorway would subdivide the village.

== Social life and sport ==
The village has a Parish Council, and its hall hosts various clubs, including a computer club, a cricket club, a gardening club and other activities.

The Cock Inn, formerly for a few years the Cock Horse, is the only public house in the village. There is also the RAF Headley Club, which is open only to servicemen and women, as well as their families from Headley Court.

The Headley Cricket Club was founded in 1893 and now incorporates the Old Freemen's side from nearby City of London Freemen's School. The team plays on the ground opposite the main Heath car park, to the south of the village centre, and has been a member of the Surrey Downs League since 2002, playing on Saturdays, with a Sunday team.

Tyrrells Wood Golf Club is a large private golf course and grounds to the west of the village and partially within the bounds of the parish.

Headley was on the London-Surrey Cycle Classic over the opening weekend of the 2012 London Olympic Games as part of the Box Hill loop, which was covered nine times in the men's event and twice in the women's. With long-distance routes in various directions, the roads in and around Headley have become very popular for leisure cycling.

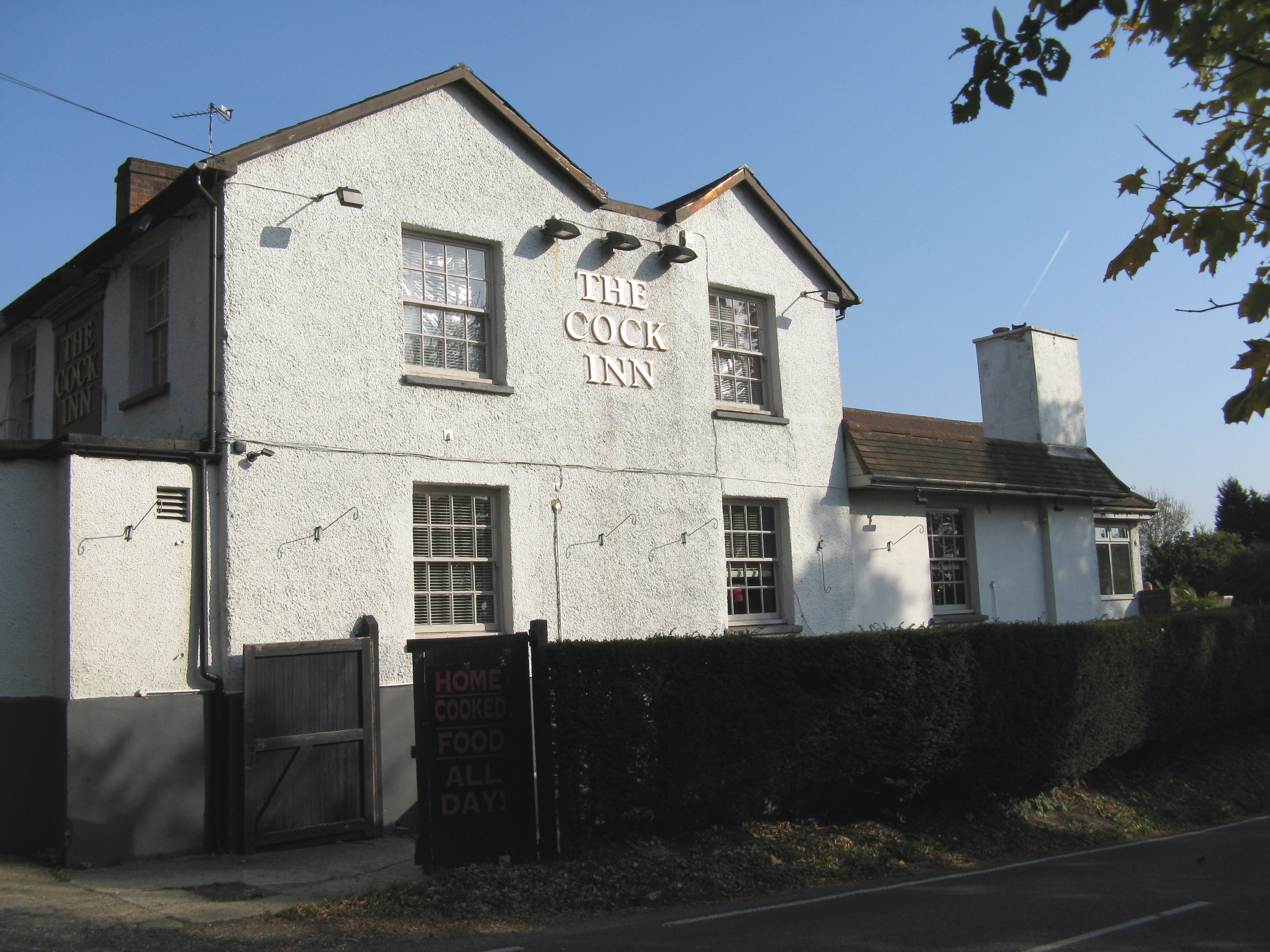
The Cock Inn

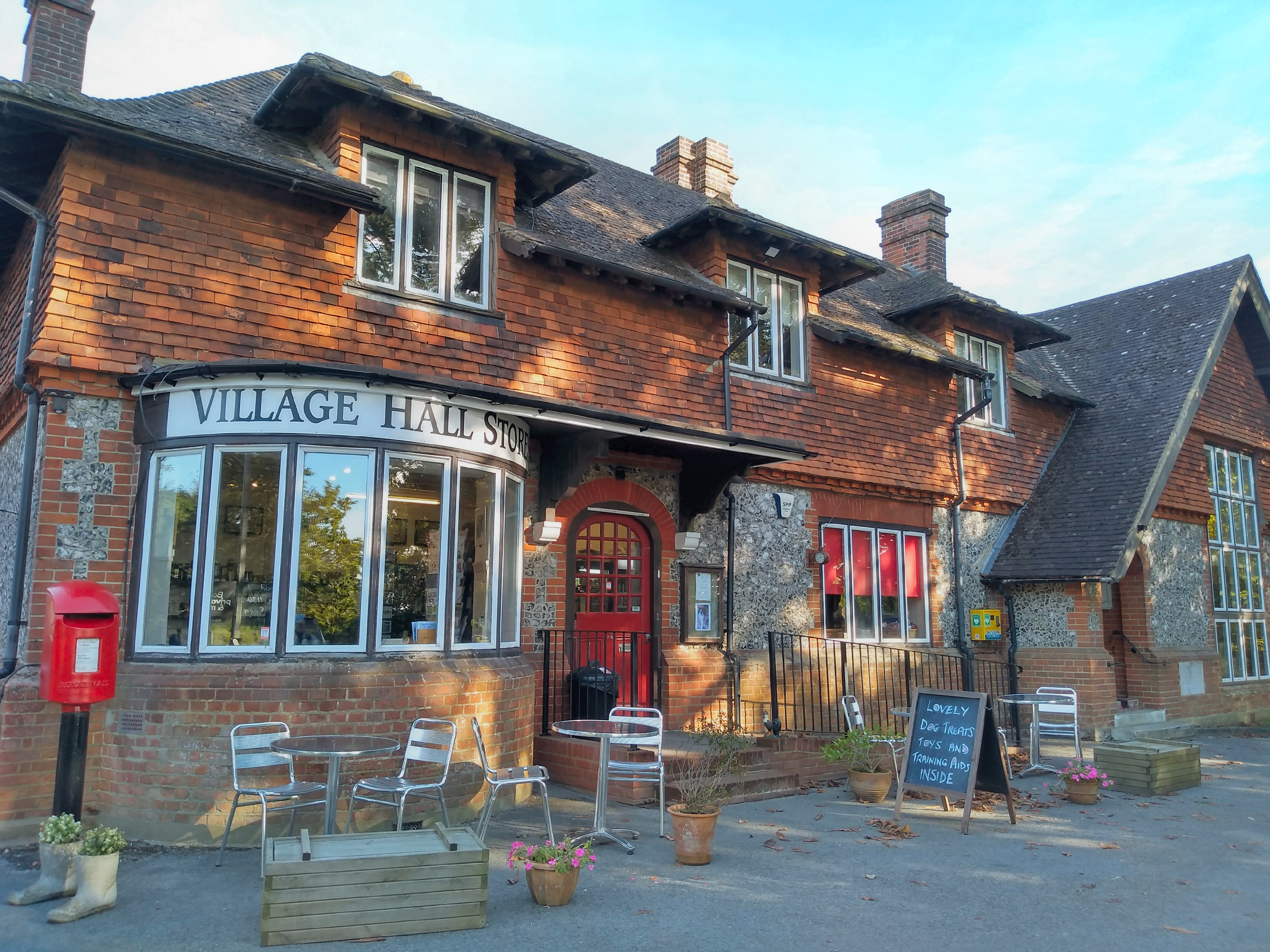
Village Hall Shop

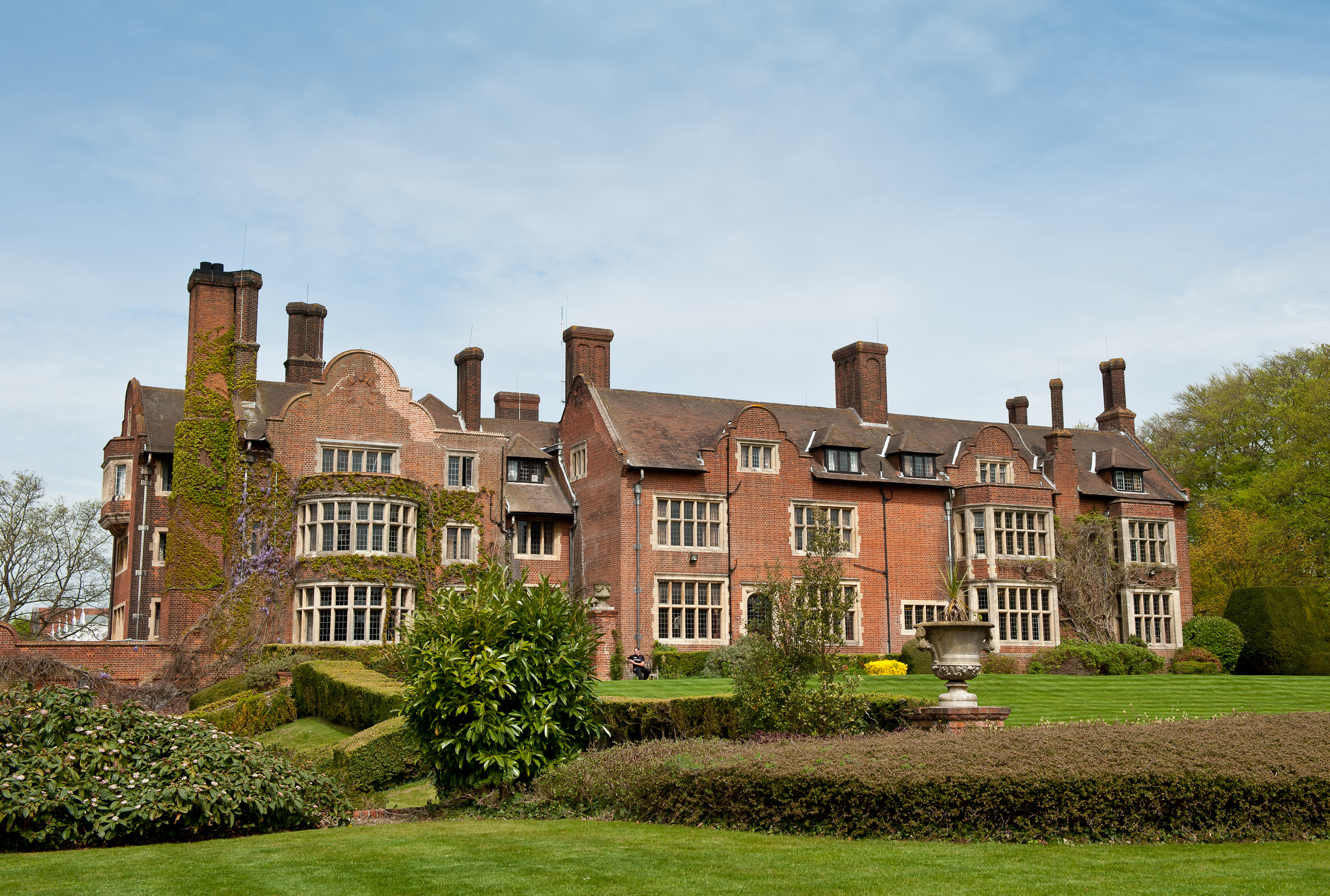
Headley Court

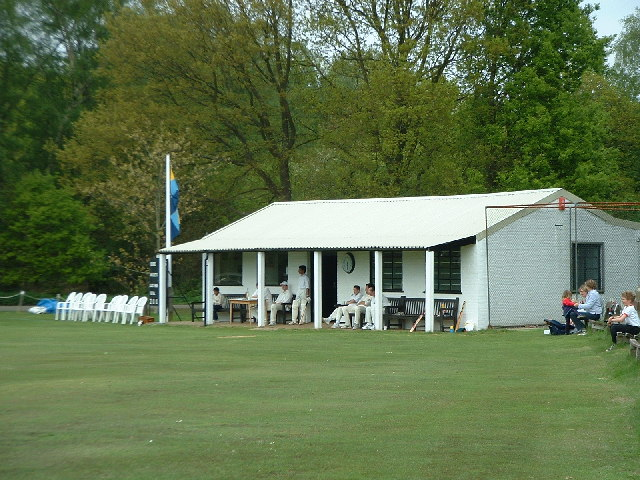
Cricket pavilion

== Demography and housing ==
2011 Census Homes
| Output area | Detached | Semi-detached | Terraced | Flats and apartments | Caravans/temporary/mobile homes | | shared between households |
|---|---|---|---|---|---|---|---|
| (Civil Parish) | 103 | 120 | 13 | 10 | 0 | 0 | |

The average level of accommodation in the region, comprising detached houses, was 28%, while the average for apartments was 22.6%.

2011 Census Key Statistics
| Output area | Population | Households | % Owned outright | % Owned with a loan | hectares |
|---|---|---|---|---|---|
| (Civil Parish) | 643 | 246 | 32.9% | 25.6% | 675 |

The proportion of households in the civil parish who owned their home outright compares to the regional average of 35.1%. The proportion who owned their home with a loan compares to the regional average of 32.5%. The remaining % is made up of rented dwellings (plus a negligible % of households living rent-free).

== Emergency services ==
These emergency services serve Headley:

- Surrey Police, everything is handled from Dorking Police Station, as Headley lies within the Mole Valley Division.
- South East Coast Ambulance Service, as of 1 July 2006, is the local NHS Ambulance Services Trust. The Surrey Ambulance Service, Sussex, and Kent ambulance services have merged and now operate as a single entity. Leatherhead or Epsom Ambulance stations are close by.
- Surrey Fire & Rescue Service, Leatherhead Fire Station, is the first response station for Headley. Although RAF Headley also has 2 Green Goddess Fire engines.
