= John Whitford =

John Whitford may refer to:

- John Whitford (priest) (d. 1667), Anglican priest and son of Walter Whitford
- John Whitford (RAF officer) (1892–1966), Royal Air Force officer in the Mediterranean Allied Air Forces
- John Whitford (racing driver), American racing driver on the List of NASCAR Cup Series champions
- John Whitford (judge) (1913–2001), British judge
