= Epsom Common =

Local Nature Reserve in Surrey, England

Coordinates: 51.328°N 0.292°W

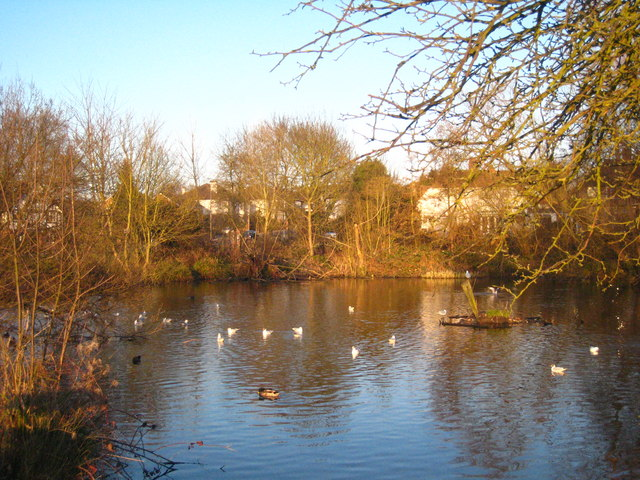
- Stamford Green Pond
- Interactive map of Epsom Common
- Type: Local Nature Reserve
- Location: Epsom, Surrey
- OS grid: TQ 191 602
- Area: 177.4 hectares (438 acres)
- Manager: Epsom and Ewell Borough Council

Epsom Common is a 177.4-hectare (438-acre) Local Nature Reserve in Epsom, Surrey, England. It is owned and managed by Epsom and Ewell Borough Council. It is part of Epsom and Ashtead Commons, a Site of Special Scientific Interest.

This is a nationally important wildlife location because it is a breeding site for birds. Moreover, insects endemic to the area depend on the dead wood on location. Other fauna include roe deer, herons and purple emperor butterflies. Additionally, there are flora such as common spotted orchids and southern marsh orchids.

The Thames Down Link long distance footpath from Kingston upon Thames to Box Hill & Westhumble station runs through the common.

== Description ==
Epsom Common is a 177.4-hectare (438-acre) Local Nature Reserve owned by Epsom and Ewell Borough Council. Since 1984, it has been part of the Epsom and Ashtead Commons Site of Special Scientific Interest and it became a Local Nature Reserve in 2001.

The majority of the common is on London Clay, but there are local deposits of gravel across the site. The maximum elevation is 70 m (230 ft) above ordnance datum. There are three main ponds (Great Pond, Baron's Pond and Stew Pond) and three smaller ponds (Blake’s Pond, Dixies Pond and Stamford Green Pond). The common includes three areas of heathland (Horton Heath, Castle Heath and Bramble Heath), which are grazed by cattle to control the spread of scrub.

Woodland areas, dominated by silver birch and English oak, provide a habitat for birds including woodpeckers, woodcocks, barn owls and tawny owls. Plant species in the heathland and grassland areas include common heather, bell heather and creeping willow. Invertebrates found on the common include the nationally rare Rhizophagus oblongicollis, the beetle Bibloporus minutus and the flies Ctenophora bimaculata and Oedalea apicalis.

Epsom Common is crossed by numerous footpaths and cycle paths, one of which, the Thames Down Link, provides a route from the River Thames at Kingston to the North Downs at Box Hill. There are two car parks: Epsom Common car park and Dartford Court car park.

== History ==
Epsom Common was held by Chertsey Abbey in the medieval period and was an area of common land associated with the Manor of Epsom. Following the dissolution of the abbey in 1537, Henry VIII granted the manor to Nicholas Carew and the land then passed through a series of private owners. In 1794, the common was described as "being covered in furze, brambles, hawthorn bushes, large quantities of hornbeams and other pollards: other parts are sour, wet pasture." Local people had free access to the land, rights of pasture and the right to cut turf and gather gorse for fuel. They were forbidden from cutting down trees for timber. In 1936, the common was bought by Epsom and Ewell Urban District Council. The council, now Epsom and Ewell Borough Council, continues to own the area today.

The first cottages are thought to have been built on Epsom Common in the 16th century. The dwellings were tolerated by the lord of the manor, but were not officially authorised. By 1755, there were over 30 so-called "squatter cottages" on the land. By the late 18th century, there was a small settlement at Stamford Green, at the north edge of the common. A license was granted to those living there allowing them to dig clay for brick and tile making. The earliest record of a windmill at Stamford Green is from 1795. Auction records from 1809 indicate that it was a post mill with two pairs of millstones and a sail diameter of 72 ft (22 m). The mill was destroyed by fire in 1873.

By the mid-19th century, the settlement at Stamford Green was sufficiently large that it was felt necessary to provide a dedicate place of worship for the residents. Christ Church was founded as a chapel of ease to the main parish church of St Martin's in 1843. Initially a temporary structure was provided until the first permanent building was opened in 1845. In July 1874, Epsom Parish was divided into two, with the western half becoming the new Parish of Epsom Common. The chapel of ease became the parish church, but was considered too small for the congregation. Its replacement, the present church, was designed in the Gothic revival style by Arthur Blomfield and opened in 1876. It is constructed from flint with stone dressings and there is a clerestory above the nave. The tower and south aisle were added in 1879 and 1887 respectively.

Great Pond and Stew Pond, are thought to have been dug in the early medieval period for Chertsey Abbey. They were probably stocked with carp and other fish, to provide food for the monks and their guests. The ponds were formed by damming a headwater of the Bonesgate Stream. In the mid-19th century, the 6-acre (2.4 ha) Great Pond was drained, but in 1974 the dam was repaired and the pond was refilled.

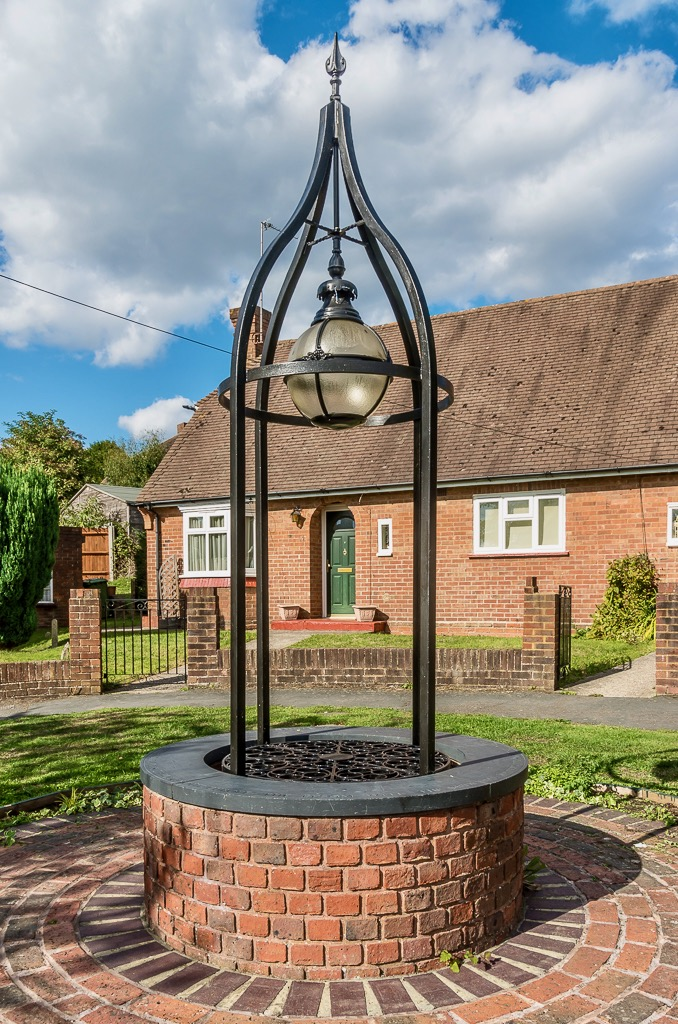
The wellhead marking the site of the original Epsom Well, was constructed in 1989.

Spa water was discovered in the late 16th or early 17th centuries. By tradition, the discoverer is generally named as Henry Wicker, a local farmer who, in 1618, noticed that his cows refused to drink from a slow spring on the common. Buildings and a wall were erected around the spring in 1671 and the spa rapidly became popular with visitors from London. Among those taking the waters at Epsom were John Aubrey, Samuel Pepys, Dorothy Osborne, Celia Fiennes and Charles II. In the mid-1720s, the popularity of Epsom rapidly declined and attempts 1760s to revive the town as a spa resort were unsuccessful.

Shortly after 1700, the lord of the manor enclosed a roughly circular area of the common surrounding the well, approximately 450 yd (410 m) in diameter. The spa buildings were demolished in 1884 and Oldwells Farm was established in its place. The farm was pulled down c. 1885 and James Stuart Strange, Lord of the Manor of Epsom, constructed a mansion in its place. In 1930, the land was sold for development and, by 1937, the first 178 houses had been erected on the Wells Estate, as it had become known. A further phase of housebuilding took place in the early 1950s and the former mansion, known as Wells House, was converted to become a residential nursery in 1953.

== Bibliography ==
- Abdy, Charles (2001). Epsom Past. Bognor Regis: Phillimore. ISBN 978-18-6-077180-4.
- Berry, Patricia, ed. (2002). Epsom: The 20th Century. Sparkford: Sutton Publishing. ISBN 978-0-75-092770-3.
- Harte, Jeremy (2005). Epsom: A History and Celebration. Salisbury: Francis Frith. ISBN 1-845-89201-1.
- Home, Gordon (1901). Epsom: Its history and surroundings. Epsom: S.R. Publishers Ltd.
