= Norbury Park =

Park and mansion in Surrey, England

Coordinates: 51.2707°N 0.3388°W

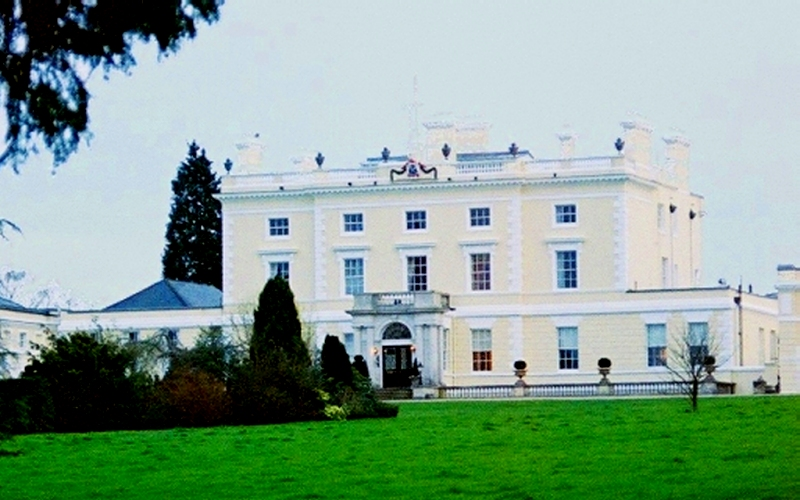
The current manor house, built in 1774.

Norbury Park is an area of mixed wooded and agricultural land surrounding a privately owned Georgian manor house near Leatherhead and Dorking, Surrey. On the west bank of the River Mole, it is close to the village of Mickleham.

The park is Grade II listed on the Register of Historic Parks and Gardens. It is part of the Mole Gap to Reigate Escarpment Special Area of Conservation and a Site of Special Scientific Interest.

== History ==
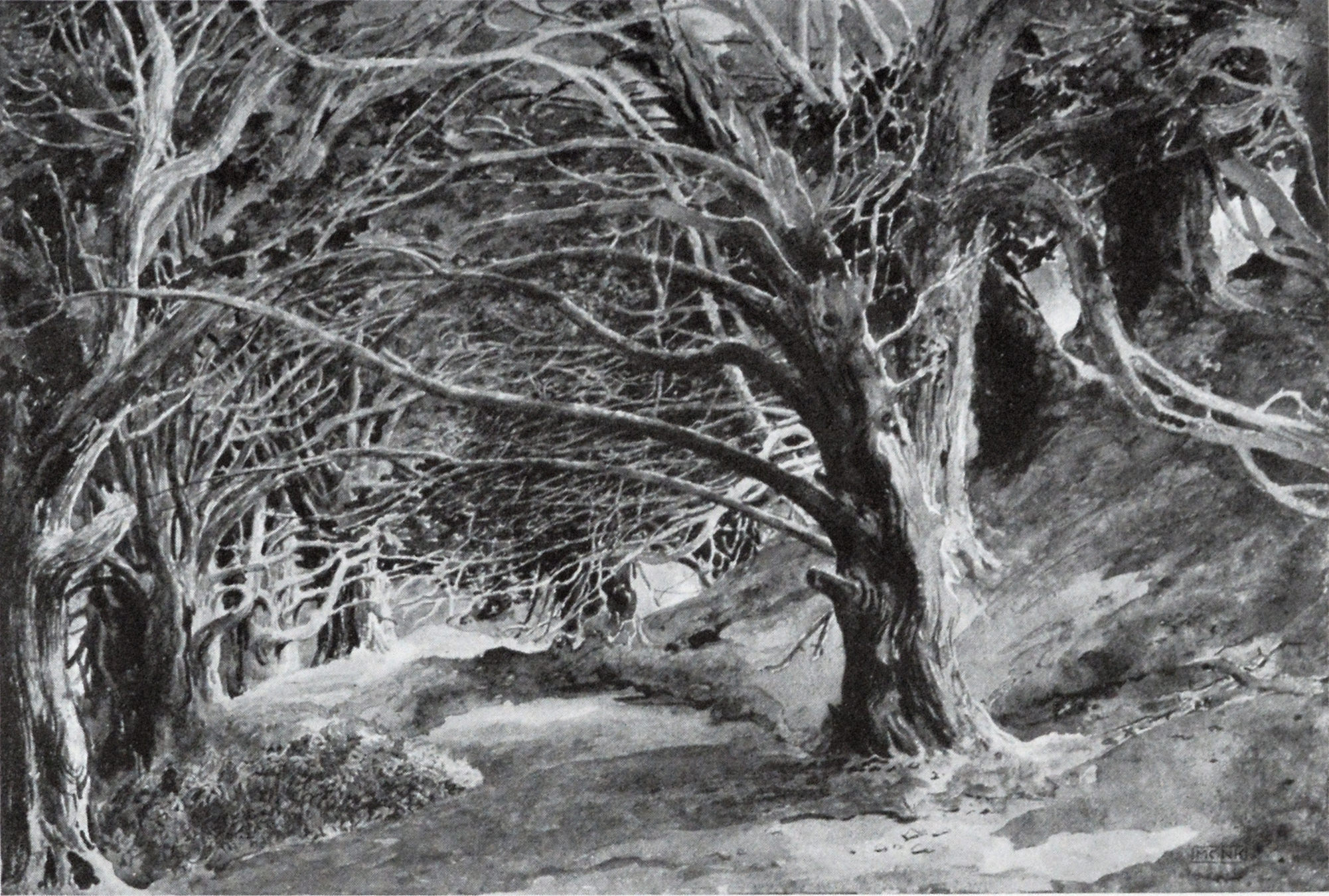
The Druid's Grove by William Monk (1863-1937)

A small Bronze Age hoard consisting of two palstave axes and a scabbard chape dating from around 1150-1000 BC was discovered in 2003 in woodland on the western side of the park. The park also contains, at Druids Grove marked on Ordnance Survey maps, an important grove of yew trees apocryphally used by Druids for rituals and ceremony. They are some of the oldest trees of Great Britain. The manor was also known as Northbury for some time.

The estate is not named in Domesday Book, however there are two entries for Mickleham and it is thought that the second of these relates to Norbury Park. In 1086, the land was held by Oswald as mesne lord to the tenant-in-chief, Richard son of Gilbert. It included five ploughlands, 1 acre (0.4 ha) of meadow and rendered £6 per year. The estate was one of several local manors comprising the Honour of Clare that had been created for Richard fitz Gilbert by William I as a reward for his support during the Norman Conquest. Oswald, the lesser tenant, was a 'conforming Saxon', who had held the land during the reign of Edward the Confessor.

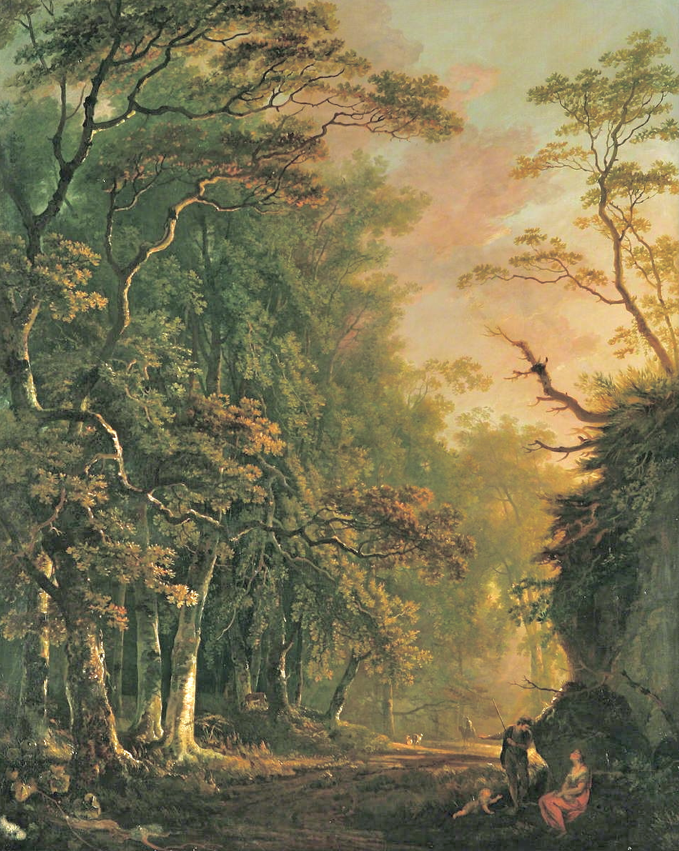
Norbury Park (1775) by George Barret Sr. (1730-1784)

In 1499 the estate was acquired by the Stidolph family, who held it until 1705. The diarist John Evelyn records a visit in August 1655 to Norbury Park, which was then owned by Sir Francis Stydolph, where he admired the great number of walnut trees. Sir Francis' son Richard, who was created a baronet by Charles II, subsequently inherited the estate and on his death it passed to his daughter, who married Thomas Tryon of Leatherhead. The estate remained in the Tryon family until 1766 when Charles Tryon (father of William Tryon, then Governor of Province of North Carolina), sold the estate to Anthony Chapman, who may have been responsible for felling thousands of walnut trees in the park for their timber value before selling the estate in 1774 to William Lock [Locke] (1732-1810), art collector, patron and amateur artist. Locke was responsible for the abandonment of the original site of the manor house on the floodplain of the River Mole. A noted connoisseur of the fine arts and a man of means, Lock pulled down part of the existing manor house, converting what remained into a farm; it now forms part of the property called The Priory. A new house was commissioned from the architect Thomas Sandby which occupied a site which would take full advantage of the picturesque qualities of the area. Lock corresponded frequently on picturesque theory with William Gilpin (1724-1804) and, according to Historic England, Norbury Park "in Lock's time became a fine example of the picturesque...In his Observations on the Western Parts of England in 1798, Gilpin wrote of Norbury: 'great houses in general resemble each other so nearly that it is difficult to find among them any characteristic features. Here the whole is new'." Lock also invited J. M. W. Turner to the estate to paint; a watercolour entitled Beech Trees at Norbury Park (1797) is held by the National Gallery of Ireland.

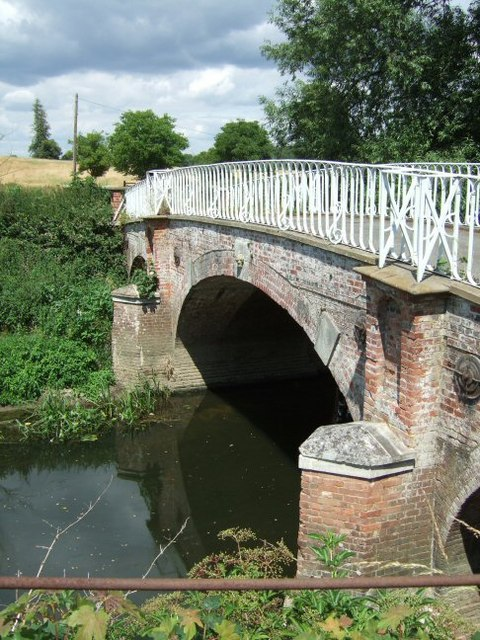
Grade II* listed Weir Bridge over the River Mole built in 1840.

Lock died in 1810 and his family left Norbury Park in 1819. Ebenezer Fuller Maitland, the former MP for Wallingford, purchased the house in around 1822, and later exchanged it for Park Place, Remenham, Berkshire, with Henry Piper Sperling. Sperling remained at Norbury Park for 24 years and was responsible for developing the gardens around the House, including the building of Weir Bridge over the River Mole, which still stands today and is Grade II* listed.

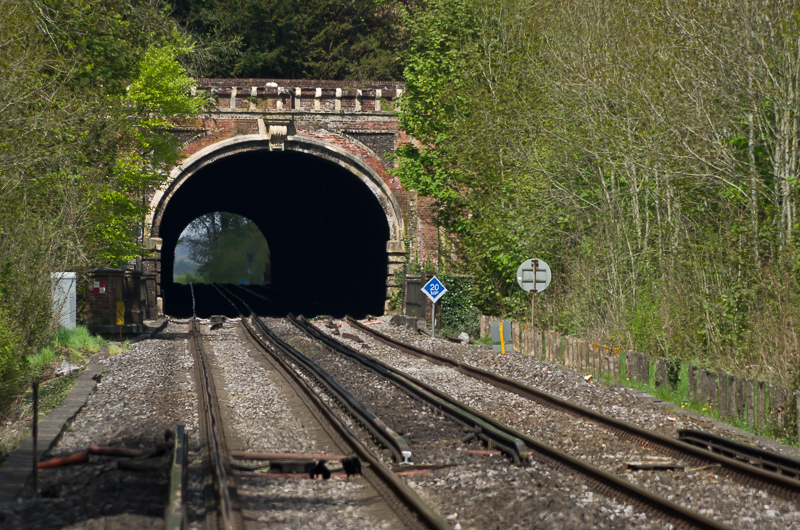
The south portal of Mickleham Tunnel

Norbury Park was purchased by Thomas Grissell in 1850. It was during his ownership that the railway line from Leatherhead to Dorking was built. Grissell insisted that the three viaducts over the River Mole be built with coloured brickwork with decorative cornices and cast-iron parapets. Similarly, the 480 m-long (520 yd) Mickleham Tunnel was bored through the chalk with no vertical ventilation shafts. When the line opened in 1867, Grissell secured the right to stop on request any train passing through the railway station at Westhumble, a concession that was abolished by the Transport Act 1962. The station was designed by Charles Henry Driver in the Châteauesque style and included steeply pitched roofs with patterned tiles and an ornamental turret topped with a decorative grille and weather vane.

Leopold Salomons purchased Norbury Park in 1890. He is best known for his gift of Box Hill to the nation in 1914, but he also funded the addition of a vestry to St Michael's Chapel in Westhumble. He died on 23 September 1915. The Norbury Park estate appears to have been partly broken up by the executors of Salomons' will. The house, stud farm and 634 acres (2.57 km^{2}) of parkland were purchased by Sir William Corry in September 1916. In August 1922 he sold the property to Sir Edward Mountain, the chairman and managing director of the Eagle Star Insurance Company.

At the urging of James Chuter Ede, Surrey County Council bought 1,340 acres (5.4 km^{2}) of Norbury Park in July 1930, for which the estate's total purchase price was £97,000 (equivalent to £5,481,808 in 2025), to protect the land from development. The council could find only part of the price, and a public appeal for more donations was unsuccessful, so the house was sold privately, while the parkland remained Council property, as it is today. Chuter Ede said he hoped the acquisition was one of the most pleasant and enduring memorials of his life's work. The parkland is managed on the council's behalf by the Surrey Wildlife Trust.

Marie Stopes, author, palaeobotanist and campaigner for eugenics and women's rights, lived at Norbury Park House from 1938 to 1958. She had been an active proponent of sexual education and birth control in the early twentieth century; her book Married Love, published in 1918, was the first sexual manual written in language simple enough to be accessible to a wide public. In 1921 she opened the first birth control clinic in London. On her death in 1958 she bequeathed the Park to the Royal Society of Literature, of which she was a member. The house was subsequently sold to Philip Spencer, an industrialist.

== House ==
Norbury Park House was designed in the Palladian style by Thomas Sandby for William Locke in 1774 and was extended by the architect, Peter Frederick Robinson, in 1820.

The entrance front, which faces northeast, has five windows on the first floor. The projecting porch is supported on either side of the main door by a pair of Doric columns. The hall has a stone floor with a stone staircase, which has a mahogany handrail and iron balustrades. The oldest fireplace in the house is made from chalk and may have been taken from the previous manor house.

The drawing room is decorated with the work of four artists, all commissioned by Locke: George Barrett Sr., to paint three landscapes on the walls; Benedetto Pastorini painted a representation of the sky on the ceiling; additional features were painted by Sawrey Gilpin and Giovani Cipriani. In the evening, light enters the room from the window, shining in the same direction as the sunset depicted in the landscape on the western wall.

== Rural industries ==
The park has three tenanted farms: Norbury Park Farm (east of the house), Swanworth Farm (to the south) and Bocketts Farm to the north. Norbury Blue cheese is named after the park. The blue cheese was made at the Dairy at Norbury Park farm until 2018, when production moved to Sherbourne Farm at Albury. Norbury Park Sawmill, around 220 m (240 yd) from the western side of the house, opened in the 1970s and closed in 2021.

== Bibliography ==
- Hart, Stephen (2021). James Chuter Ede: Humane Reformer and Politician. Barnsley: Pen & Sword. ISBN 978-1-52-678372-1.
- Jackson, AA (1988). Dorking's Railways. Dorking: Dorking Local History Group. ISBN 1-870912-01-2.
- Shepperd, R (1982). The Manor of Wistomble in the Parish of Mickleham. Westhumble Association.
