= Epsom and Ashtead Commons =

Nature reserve in Surrey, United KIngdom

Coordinates: 51.327°N 0.308°W

- Site of Special Scientific Interest
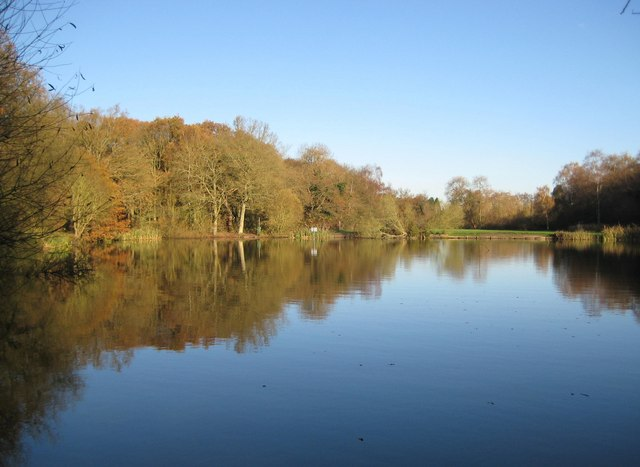
- Stew Pond, Epsom Common
- Location of Epsom and Ashtead Commons.
- Area of search: Surrey
- Grid reference: TQ 180 600
- Interest: Biological
- Area: 360.4 hectares (891 acres)
- Notification date: 1984
- Location map: Magic Map

Epsom and Ashtead Commons are a 360.4-hectare (891-acre) biological Site of Special Scientific Interest on the outskirts of Epsom and Ashtead in Surrey. Epsom Common is a local nature reserve, and Ashtead Common is a national nature reserve, The site also includes a triangular enclosure which is a Scheduled Monument

These commons have diverse habitats on London Clay which provide habitats for rich communities of breeding birds. This is one of the most important sites in the county for invertebrates, including a threatened beetle, Rhizophagus oblongicollis and three nationally rare species, the beetle Bibloporus minutus and the flies Ctenophora bimaculata and Oedalea apicalis.
