= John Whitford (judge) =

British judge

Sir John Norman Keates Whitford (24 June 1913 – 5 November 2001) was a British barrister and judge. An intellectual property specialist, he was a High Court judge, sitting in the Chancery Division, from 1970 to 1988.

== Biography ==
The son of Harry Whitford and Ella Mary Keates, John Whitford (known to family and friends as "Jack") was educated at University College School, the Ludwig-Maximilians-Universität München, and Peterhouse, Cambridge, where he was the president of the Cambridge University Amateur Dramatic Club.

Whitford was called to the Bar by the Inner Temple in 1935 and was the pupil of Tom Denning (later Lord Denning). A member of the Royal Air Force Volunteer Reserve, Whitford was called up immediately upon the outbreak of the Second World War, and was assigned to work on the radar. He was sent to the Middle East, then Crete, where he had to destroy his AMES during the Battle of Crete. He was evacuated with the rest of the RAF contingent on HMS Orion. Promoted to the rank of Wing Commander in 1942, Whitford was appointed chief radar officer and deputy chief signals officer at Air Headquarters, Eastern Mediterranean. (Note: He should not be confused with Air Vice Marshal Sir John Whitford, who held air command in the Mediterranean theatre.) He was subsequently posted to the British Embassy in Washington D.C. in 1944, where he advised on patents and wartime information exchange and cooperation.

On demobilization, Whitford returned to the Bar and joined the Middle Temple ad eundem because of the devastation the Inner Temple suffered from bombing; he became a Bencher of the Middle Temple in 1970. He decided to specialise in patents, and joined the chambers of George Lloyd-Jacob, later the first specialist patents judge. He became a Queen's Counsel in 1965. From 1968 to 1970 he was a member of the Bar Council.

In 1970, he was appointed a Justice of the High Court, and received the customary knighthood. He was assigned to the Chancery Division to deal with the patent business. From 1974 to 1976, he was chairman of the departmental committee on the law relating to copyright and designs, whose report is usually referred to as the Whitford report.

Although he had a reputation for bonhomie at the Bar, where he was nicknamed "Jolly Jack," on the bench Whitford was said to be "often bored and short-tempered." He had difficulty assessing the credibility of witnesses, was prone to taking a dislike to a party and jumping to conclusions, and was sometimes rude to counsel. He retired from judicial service in 1988.

Whitford married Rosemary Barcham Green in 1946; she was the widow of a close Cambridge friend who had been killed as an RAF pilot on active service. They had four daughters.
