= Norbury Blue =

English blue cheese

Norbury Blue is an English blue cheese made in Surrey. It is entirely handmade and the only blue cheese made in the South of England with milk from a closed herd of Friesian cows, fed on GM-free fodder. The cheese was made at the Dairy at Norbury Park Farm until 2018, when production moved to Sherbourne Farm at Albury.

== Preparation ==
The cheese is made with vegetarian rennet and unpasteurised cows' milk. A Roquefort type culture P. roqueforti is used to create the blue marbled effect. It is left to mature at around 12–14 °C (54–57 °F) for three weeks, giving the blue mould time to grow. It is completely natural and contains no artificial colourings.

== Composition ==
Norbury Blue has a moist, creamy texture with a pleasantly musty aroma. It is tangy like Roquefort with the creaminess of rich Brie. The blue veins have a smoky, earthy flavour. Norbury Blue cheese has a dark, bark-like rind and a delicately marbled, white interior.
