= Stydolph baronets =

Extinct baronetcy in the Baronetage of England

The Stydolph Baronetcy, of Norbury in the County of Surrey, was a title in the Baronetage of England. It was created on 24 December 1660 for Richard Stydolph, subsequently High Sheriff of Surrey in 1667. The title became extinct on his death in 1677.

The family seat was Norbury Park, Surrey.

== Stydolph baronets, of Norbury (1660) ==
Escutcheon of the Stydolph baronets of Norbury

- Sir Richard Stydolph, 1st Baronet (c. 1630–1677)
