= Ralph Cupper =

English organist

Ralph Cupper (born 9 August 1954) is an organist, director and composer who was born and raised in Norwich, within the county of Norfolk, England.

== History ==
Ralph Cupper began to play the piano with Edna Watering when he was 6 years old. Later he learnt the organ with David Storey and Peter Notley and the clarinet with Charles Unwin. While he was at the Hewett School he became a member of the school choir. It was while he was at school that Cupper became influenced by the music environment which Colin Clouting and the distinguished concert pianist Eileen Last had responsibility for. It was during this period that Cupper had piano tuition with Eileen Last.

After he concluded his studies at the Hewett School in Norwich, Cupper studied at the Royal Academy of Music in London. While he was there he studied the organ with Douglas Hawkridge; choir/orchestra direction with Dr Douglas Hopkins; harmony, counterpoint and fugue with Drs. Arthur Pritchard and Arthur Wills. After he finished in 1976 he did an extended course of Organ studies with Susi Jeans and Nicolas Kynaston with the help of a stipend from Alderman Norman's Foundation. In 1979 Cupper was awarded a stipend from the Arts Council of Great Britain to study the organ with the well-known Dutch organist Bernard Bartelinck, who was at that time Organist at the Bavo Cathedral in Haarlem in the Netherlands.

After his studies Cupper came back to his home city of Norwich, to begin his career as an organist and music teacher within Norfolk County Council's Adult Education Department. He has also been Organist/Choir Master in many parishes in Norfolk. Wymondham Abbey and Christ Church New Catton, Norwich were two of the last places where he was Organist and Choir Master. At that time he also studied Theology and Androgogy at Cambridge.

In 1988 Cupper became a registered member of the 'Norsk Kantor og Organist-forbund' and was there upon successfully appointed to the position of Cantor in the State Lutheran Church in Nordfjordeid, on the western coast of Norway.

Cupper still resides in Nordfjordeid. He is married to the locally known author, Karin Cupper. They have two children, Matthew and Mark, and a dog called Monty.

== Known for ==
Ralph Cupper is known as a composer, pianist and organist and has held many concert tours in England, Germany and Norway. He has also worked for the Norwegian TV channel NRK and the BBC.

Since he has been living in Norway, Ralph Cupper has given out two CDs with the distinguished Norwegian saxophonist, Inge Asbjørn Haugen. In these two CD's., Cupper and Haugen have successfully combined traditional organ music with popular film music.

He is also known in Nordfjordeid for helping the local hospital and other community events by arranging concerts to support these causes.

Every year Ralph Cupper arranges a local musical festival in Nordfjordeid, called ‘Aftenmusikk’. In this capacity he has had the opportunity to invite musicians, choirs and orchestras to Nordfjordeid not only from Scandinavia but also from Europe. ‘Aftenmusikk’ takes place each week in February, and encourages tourists to visit the municipality of Eid. This music festival, which has existed for over five years, is now the cultural high point of the churches year in this district.
