= George Lloyd-Jacob =

Sir George Lloyd-Jacob

Justice of the High Court
- In office 1950–1969

Sir George Harold Lloyd-Jacob (1 October 1897 – 3 December 1969) was a British High Court judge who was notable for his work in patent law. In 1950, he was appointed to the Chancery Division and became the first judge to specialise in patents.

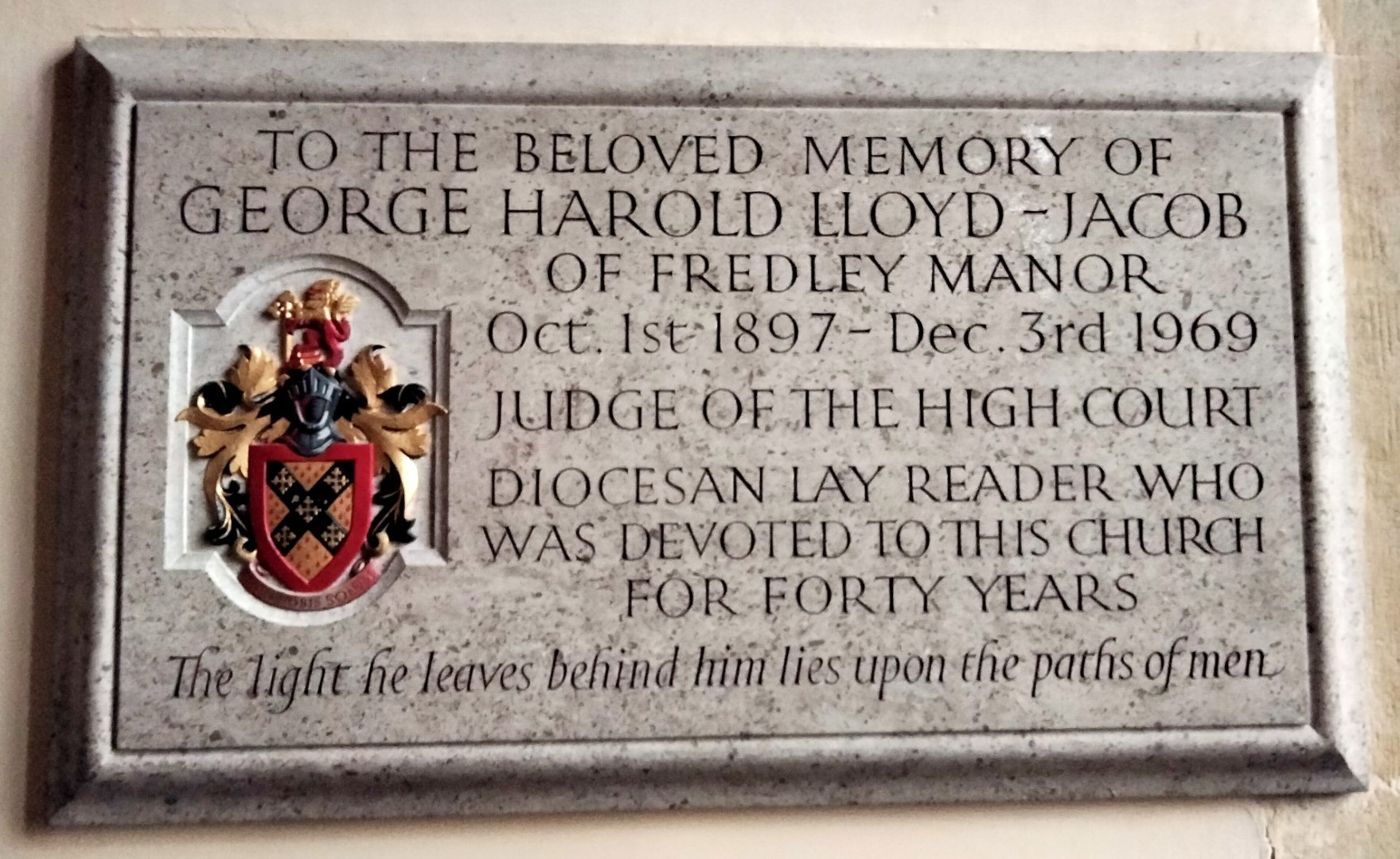
Plaque commemorating Lloyd-Jacob in St Michael's church Mickleham, Surrey

Lloyd-Jacob was born in Wood Green, Middlesex, one of 10 children born to John Lloyd-Jacob and Jane Catherine Park. He was educated at Southgate School, Christ Church, Oxford and King's College, London. In the First World War, he saw service with the Royal Flying Corps and served in the Royal Air Force from 1918 to 1921. He was called to the bar in 1923 and took silk in 1945.

From 1937 to 1945, Lloyd-Jacob served as junior counsel to the Board of Trade on patent matters. He was appointed to the High Court in January 1950 and was knighted by King George VI the following month. In 1967, in a 49-day patent case he was hearing, defendants Rolls-Royce – who were being sued over a dispute over engine patents – insured Lloyd-Jacob's life for £100,000 until the end of the case.

An Anglican lay reader, he lived in Mickleham, Surrey.

He died unexpectedly in Surrey at age 72.
