= Mickleham, Surrey =

Village in Surrey, England

Coordinates: 51.268°N 0.321°W

Mickleham
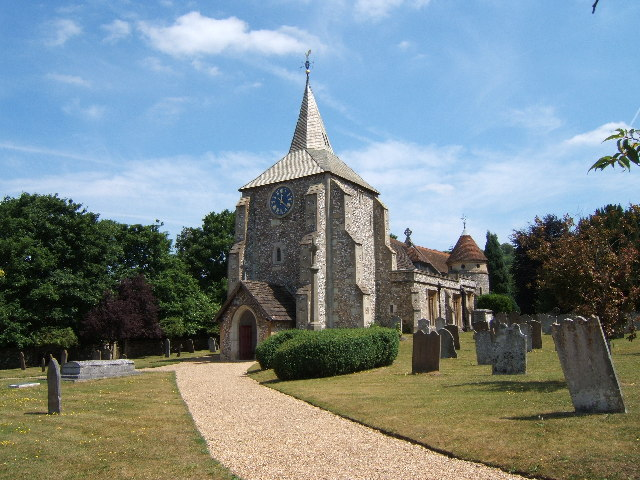
- St Michael's Church

- Location within Surrey
- Area: 7.31 km^{2} (2.82 sq mi)
- Population: 585 (Civil Parish 2011)
  - Density: 80/km^{2} (210/sq mi)
- OS grid reference: TQ171534
- Civil parish: Mickleham
- District: Mole Valley
- Shire county: Surrey
- Region: South East
- Country: England
- Sovereign state: United Kingdom
- Post town: Dorking
- Postcode district: RH5
- Dialling code: 01372 or 01306
- Police: Surrey
- Fire: Surrey
- Ambulance: South East Coast
- UK Parliament: Dorking and Horley

Mickleham is a village in south east England, between the towns of Dorking and Leatherhead in Surrey. The civil parish covers 7.31 square kilometres (1,810 acres) and includes the hamlet of Fredley. The larger ecclesiastical parish includes the majority of the neighbouring village of Westhumble, from which Mickleham is separated by the River Mole.

== History ==
Mickleham lies near to the old Roman road known as Stane Street, which ran from London to Chichester. It acquired its Old English based name in Anglo-Saxon times, when it was a small settlement lying within the Copthorne hundred.

Mickleham appears in the Domesday Book of 1086 as Michelham and Micleham. It was partly held by Nigel from the Bishop of Bayeux and partly by Oswald from (under) Richard de Tonbridge. Its Domesday assets were: 7 hides; 1 church, 7 ploughs, 3 acres (12,000 m^{2}) of meadow, woodland worth 4 hogs. It rendered £10 per year to its overlords.

Nearby Mickleham Downs was the venue for a single wicket cricket match in June 1730. The game was between two teams of three and played for a stake of £50. The teams, Surrey and Sussex, were described in a contemporary newspaper report as "esteemed the best in the respective counties" but it does not name the players. This is the first and only reference to Mickleham in association with cricket of a senior level.

Mickleham is mentioned in Jane Austen's novel Emma (1815).

The philosopher and amateur botanist John Stuart Mill protested against the building of a railway though the "beautiful valley of Mickleham" in 1836, while 1852 Grand National winner, Miss Mowbray was prepared for the race in the Village by trainer, George Dockeray. The village has featured in cycling, following the loops of Box Hill adopted by various versions of the London-Surrey Cycle Classic which was an annual event for a few years after its use in the 2012 Summer Olympics.

== Amenities ==
=== Places of worship ===
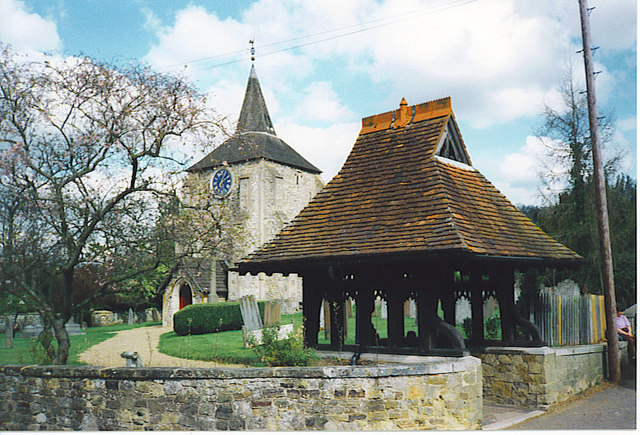
St Michael's Church and lychgate, viewed from the south west.

The main place of worship is St. Michael's Church, surrounded by St Michael's Churchyard. The church (in full the "Parish Church of St. Michael and All Angels in Mickleham") has a Norman west tower and a Norman chancel arch, raised in the 1871 restoration by Ewan Christian, who added neo-Norman aisles and east end. The Norbury chapel on the north side is late Perpendicular, with chequerboard flint and clunch walling. The majority of the stained glass windows are by Clayton and Bell with others by Percy Bacon Bros, Morris & Sons and a modern window by Alfred Fisher (2015).

=== Community facilities and commerce ===
The village has a Village Hall, two pubs (The Running Horses and The King William IV) and a restaurant (51 Degrees North).

=== Schools ===
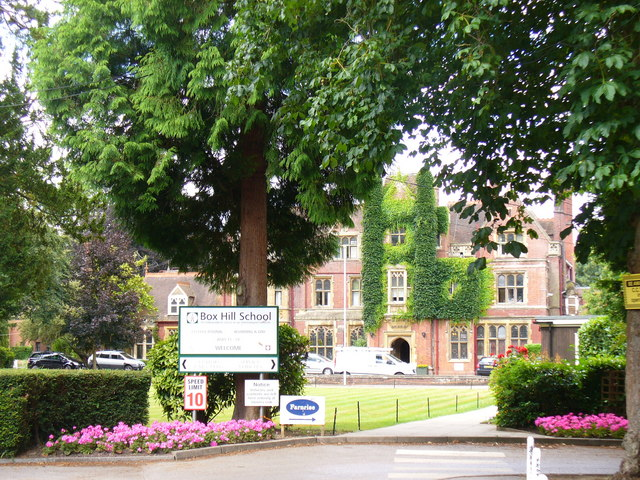
Box Hill School - Dalewood House in Mickleham village, now a boarding school. It follows Kurt Hahn's educational principles.

In the village are Box Hill School, an independent secondary school, St Michael's Infant C of E (Aided) School and St Michael's Community Nursery.

=== Transport ===
Roads

The A24 bypasses Mickleham with a dual-carriageway bypass.

Railway

Box Hill & Westhumble station, located across the A24, and towards Westhumble, provides a link to London and Horsham.

Buses

The 465 bus route runs every hour or half-hour (except nights) between Kingston upon Thames and Dorking, via Mickleham village.

== Localities ==
=== Fredley ===
The hamlet and former manor of Fredley is approximately 300m south of the centre of Mickleham. Juniper Hall, run by the Field Studies Council is located there.

James Clavell, the Australian novelist and screenwriter, lived at Fredley Manor between 1970 and 1990.

=== Mickleham Downs ===
The hillside to the east of the village, known as Mickleham Downs, was donated to the National Trust in January 1939 by Lord Beaverbrook, the proprietor of the Daily Express newspaper, who had recently purchased the Cherkley Court estate.

=== Norbury Park ===
Across the Mole and the A24 is Norbury Park. In this is the 'Druids Grove' which is an area of mature Yew trees.

=== The Burford Bridge and the zig-zag road ===
Here is the hotel that was frequented by Lord Nelson, 150m north of which starts the Zig-Zag road, one of the two local roads for motor vehicles climbing Box Hill.

== Landmarks ==
The surrounding area contains many Sites of Special Scientific Interest (SSSI) including the Mickleham Downs and panoramic beauty spot of Box Hill.

The River Mole flows nearby. As its name suggests, the river in places goes underground due to the chalk bed being dissolved, forming swallow holes (sinkholes). Ian Middleton tells of his father, sometime in the 1950s, the village police officer P.C. Middleton, looking past his bathroom mirror one morning whilst shaving to see a mature oak tree disappear into the ground. It turned out that the river flowing underground had been gradually wearing away the supporting ground under the tree, forming a giant such hole which had collapsed. The subsequent pit was not filled in until about 1968 approx, when it was still 30 ft deep and 30 ft across.

== Notable residents ==
- Sir Carl Aarvold (1907–1991), Recorder of London (senior judge at the Old Bailey), who tried the Kray twins, and who played rugby for England and the British Lions 1928–1933, lived in Westhumble.
- Maurice Allom (1906–1995) England Test cricketer 1930–31, lived at Eastfield Cottage.
- Richard Bedford Bennett, 1st Viscount Bennett, Prime Minister of Canada from 1930 to 1935, retired here after his life in politics. He is buried in St Michael's Churchyard, the only former Prime Minister of Canada not buried in that country.
- Mrs. Maria Drummond lived at Fredley and was buried here.
- Sir Stuart Etherington (born 1955), leading charity executive and former social worker, was brought up in the village.
- Detective story writer Cyril Hare was born in Mickleham Hall in 1900 and died at Westhumble in the parish in 1958; he is buried in the churchyard. So is his wife's grandfather, Sir Trevor Lawrence, who had famous orchid houses at Burford Lodge in the parish.
- Sir George Lloyd-Jacob (1897–1969), British High Court judge.
- Sir John Norton-Griffiths, 1st Baronet, "Empire Jack", the driving force behind the Tunnelling companies of the Royal Engineers in WW I, was buried at Mickleham Church on 18 October 1930.
- Richard "Conversation" Sharp (1759-1835), politician, had a country retreat at Fredley Farm and entertained many leading figures of the day there.
- William Wingfield MP, was born here.

== Demography and housing ==
2011 Census Homes
Output area	Detached	Semi-detached	Terraced	Flats and apartments	Caravans/temporary/mobile homes	shared between households
(Civil Parish)	74	51	15	35	0	0

The average level of accommodation in the region composed of detached houses was 28%, the average that was apartments was 22.6%.

2011 Census Key Statistics
Output area	Population	Households	% Owned outright	% Owned with a loan	hectares
(Civil Parish)	585	175	27.4%	24.6%	731

The proportion of households in the civil parish who owned their home outright compares to the regional average of 35.1%. The proportion who owned their home with a loan compares to the regional average of 32.5%. The remaining % is made up of rented dwellings (plus a negligible % of households living rent-free).

== See also ==
- HMS Mickleham, a Ham class minesweeper; the village gave its name to this.
