= Thames Down Link =

15-mile footpath in south-east England

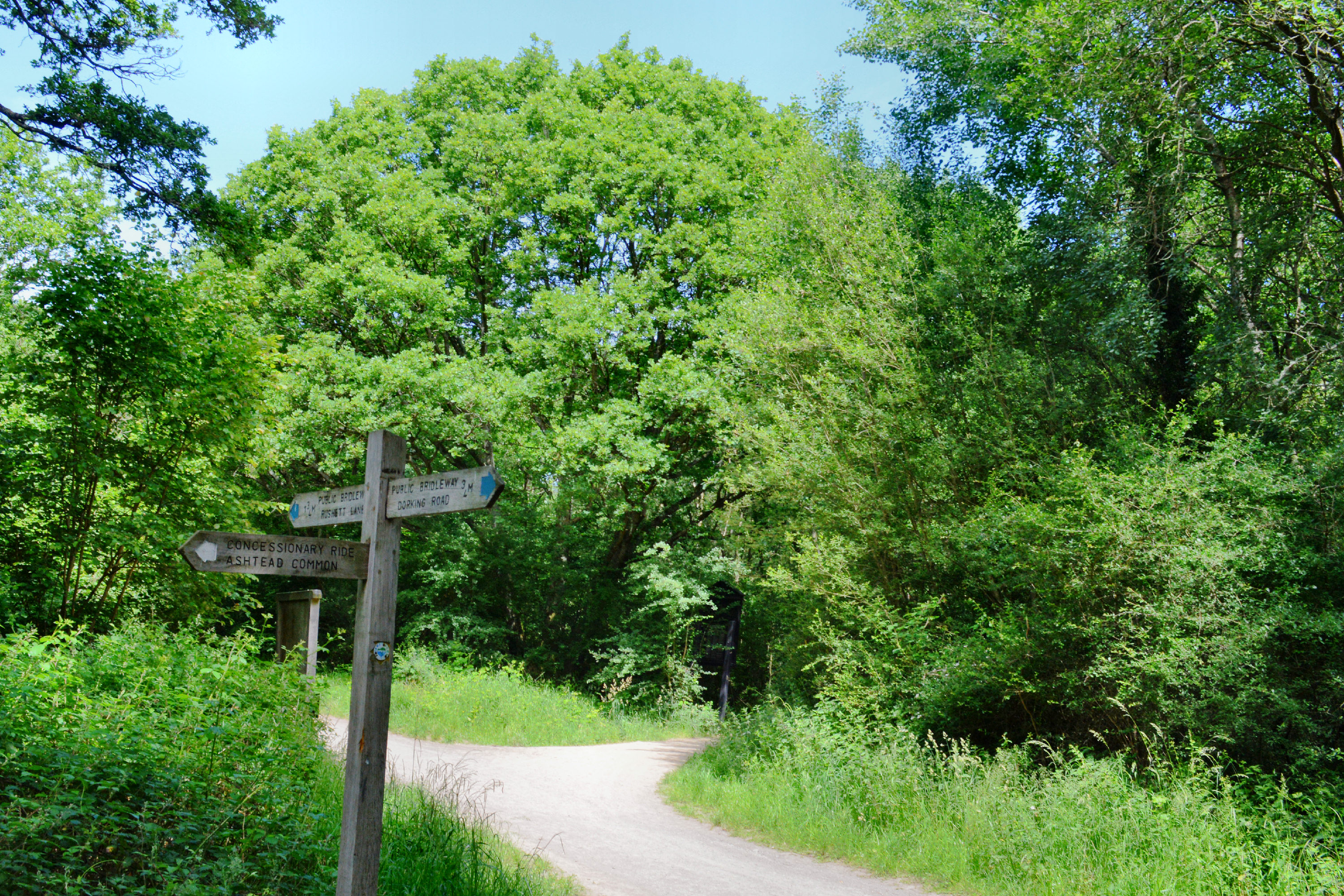
- A junction of Thames Downs Link Path joining Ashtead Common and Epsom Common
- Length: 15 mi (24 km)
- Location: Greater London, Surrey
- Designation: Long Distance Footpath
- Trailheads: Kingston Bridge; 51.4110°N 0.3081°W; Box Hill station 51.2540°N 0.3285°W
- Use: Hiking
- Highest point: Mickleham Downs, 137 m (449 ft)
- Lowest point: Kingston Bridge, 10 m (33 ft)
- Difficulty: easy
- Season: all
- Sights: Hogsmill (river), River Mole, Ashtead Park school and Downs, Box Hill, Surrey,

The Thames Down Link is a 24 km (15 mi) official walking route linking the Thames Path and the North Downs Way. It starts in the town centre of Kingston upon Thames and finishes at Box Hill & Westhumble railway station.

== Name ==
The path is so called as it connects the River Thames with the North Downs, the hill range which is to the south as far as the western border of Surrey.

== Sources ==
The route starts at Kingston upon Thames town centre and finishes at Box Hill & Westhumble railway station. The path follows as closely as possible the banks of the Hogsmill River through the urban fringes of Kingston passing Berrylands railway station. South of this it is more rural following the banks of the river south through fields to the A3 and under the South West railway line. A pavemented section by roads passes through Old Malden.

After crossing the A240 near Tolworth centre the walk leaves the Hogsmill River and continues on a narrow green strip between houses and beside a stream to reach the Horton Country Park, Ewell. The route follows a wide path through the country park soon passing the former West Park Hospital. It continues over elevated Epsom Common and then crosses the Sutton and Mole Valley Lines to reach Ashtead Park.

The route then passes through the edge of Ashtead and then begins to climb up to the North Downs, crossing the M25 motorway and then following the ancient Stane Street Roman Road through Tyrrell's Wood and on over Mickleham Downs from where a trip to neighbouring Box Hill on the path to the south is recommended for those making the return journey by foot. It otherwise reaches further south then west to reach the A24 and the North Downs Way which continues west about 200 metres to Box Hill & Westhumble railway station (Chapel Lane, Westhumble).

== See also ==
- Long-distance footpaths in the UK
- Thames Path
- North Downs Way
- London Loop
