= Tim Rishton =

British musician

Timothy John Rishton is a British/Norwegian classical concert musician, author and broadcaster, known as an advocate for the musical qualities of pre-1800 keyboard music.

Rishton’s organ concerts have a particularly large following in Germany and Norway (though he plays throughout Europe and elsewhere), while his books and other writings (including a couple of dozen articles in both refereed and popular-academic journals) have been published largely in the US, UK, Norway and New Zealand. Most of his published work is written in Norwegian. He has recorded a number of CDs, particularly of early music.

His YouTube channel contains about a hundred films. Each episode presents one piece of organ music, discusses some aspect of interpretation or performance technique and concludes with a performance.

== Early life ==
Born in a moorland village in the Pennines of Northern England, Rishton studied in the 1980s with the Austrian organist Susi Jeans and at Reading, Manchester and Bangor universities, being awarded a Ph D in 18th-century music. He taught music at the university of Wales through the medium of Welsh (and was also Director of Music at the Collegiate Church in Holyhead) before moving to Norway where he became Associate Professor of Music at University College Tromsø, music officer for the Diocese of Nord-Hålogaland and leader of a course centre at Soltun Folkehøgskole. From 2005 to 2009 he was Director of Studies in Continuing Music Education at Lancaster University, England, before returning to Norway.

Tim Rishton believes that music belongs in the community and therefore prefers to give concerts in villages rather than in city concert halls. He also regards music as a non-competitive activity and does not participate in competitions.

== Bibliography ==
- Tim Rishton, Organist, at your service. Waikanae, New Zealand: Pipeline Press, 2024
- Tim Rishton, Bausteine: Werkzeugkasten für Choralgebundene Improvisation. Lyche: 2023
- Tim Rishton, Joyful Noise? The Why, What and How of music in church. Foreword by former Archbishop George Carey. Skipton: Holy Trinity Press, 2006
- Tim Rishton, Liturgisk orgelspill. Stavanger: Cantando, 1996
