= Box Hill & Westhumble railway station =

Railway station in Surrey, England

Coordinates: 51°15′14″N 0°19′44″W

Box Hill and Westhumble
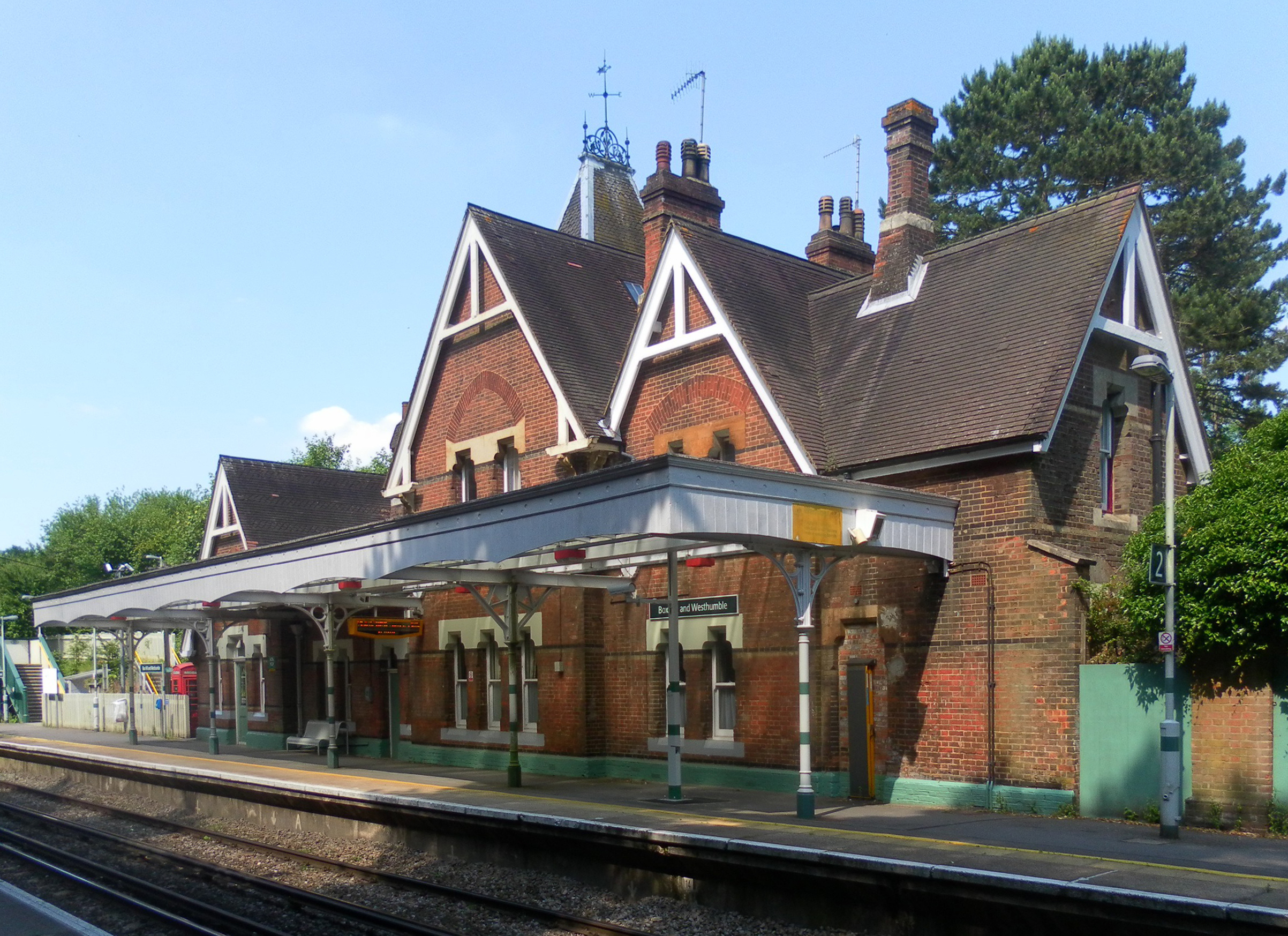

General information
- Location: Westhumble, District of Mole Valley; England
- Grid reference: TQ167518
- Manager: Southern
- Platforms: 2

Other information
- Station code: BXW
- Classification: DfT category F2

History
- Opened: 11 March 1867

Passengers
- 2020/21: ▼48,982
- 2021/22: ▲93,512
- 2022/23: ▲0.106 million
- 2023/24: ▲0.133 million
- 2024/25: ▲0.146 million

Listed Building – Grade II
- Designated: 30 December 1980
- Reference no.: 1278326
Location
Notes
- Passenger statistics from the Office of Rail and Road

Box Hill & Westhumble is a railway station in the village of Westhumble in Surrey, England, approximately 2 miles (3.2 km) north of Dorking town centre. Box Hill is located approximately 1/2 mile (800 m) to the east. It is 21 miles 14 chains (34.1 km) down the line from London Waterloo. Train services are operated by Southern who manage the station, and South Western Railway.

The station is the end point for the Thames Down Link long-distance footpath from Kingston upon Thames, and lies close to the midpoint of the Mole Gap Trail between Leatherhead and Dorking. The station is within 1/2 mile (800 m) of the North Downs Way.

== History ==
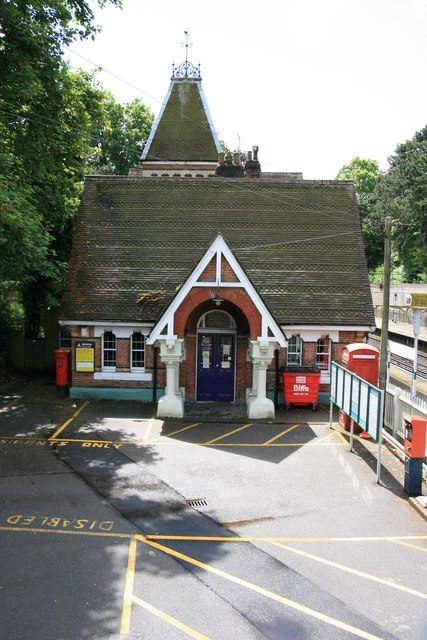
The main station building, on Platform 1, was designed by Charles Henry Driver in the Châteauesque style.

The station was constructed at the insistence of Thomas Grissell the owner of Norbury Park, in part compensation for the railway cutting across his land to the north of the village. The main building was designed by Charles Henry Driver in the Châteauesque style and included steeply pitched roofs with patterned tiles and an ornamental turret topped with a decorative grille and weather vane. The building is currently in use as a private dwelling and commercial premises and is protected by a Grade II listing.

Grissell also obtained the right from the LBSCR to stop any train on request, a privilege subsequently exercised by Leopold Salomons, who purchased Norbury Park in 1890. This concession was legally abolished by the Transport Act of 1962, however there is no evidence to suggest that it was regularly used after 1910.

The name of the station has changed many times over the years with "Box Hill" & "Boxhill" and "Westhumble" & "West Humble" used in varying combinations for signs, timetables and railway maps, with many inconsistencies. In 2006, after consultation with local residents, the station's name was changed to "Box Hill and Westhumble" from "Boxhill and Westhumble".

Year	Name of station
1867	West Humble for Box Hill
1870	Box Hill and Burford Bridge
1896	Box Hill
1904	Box Hill and Burford Bridge
1958	Boxhill and Westhumble
2006	Box Hill and Westhumble

== Services ==
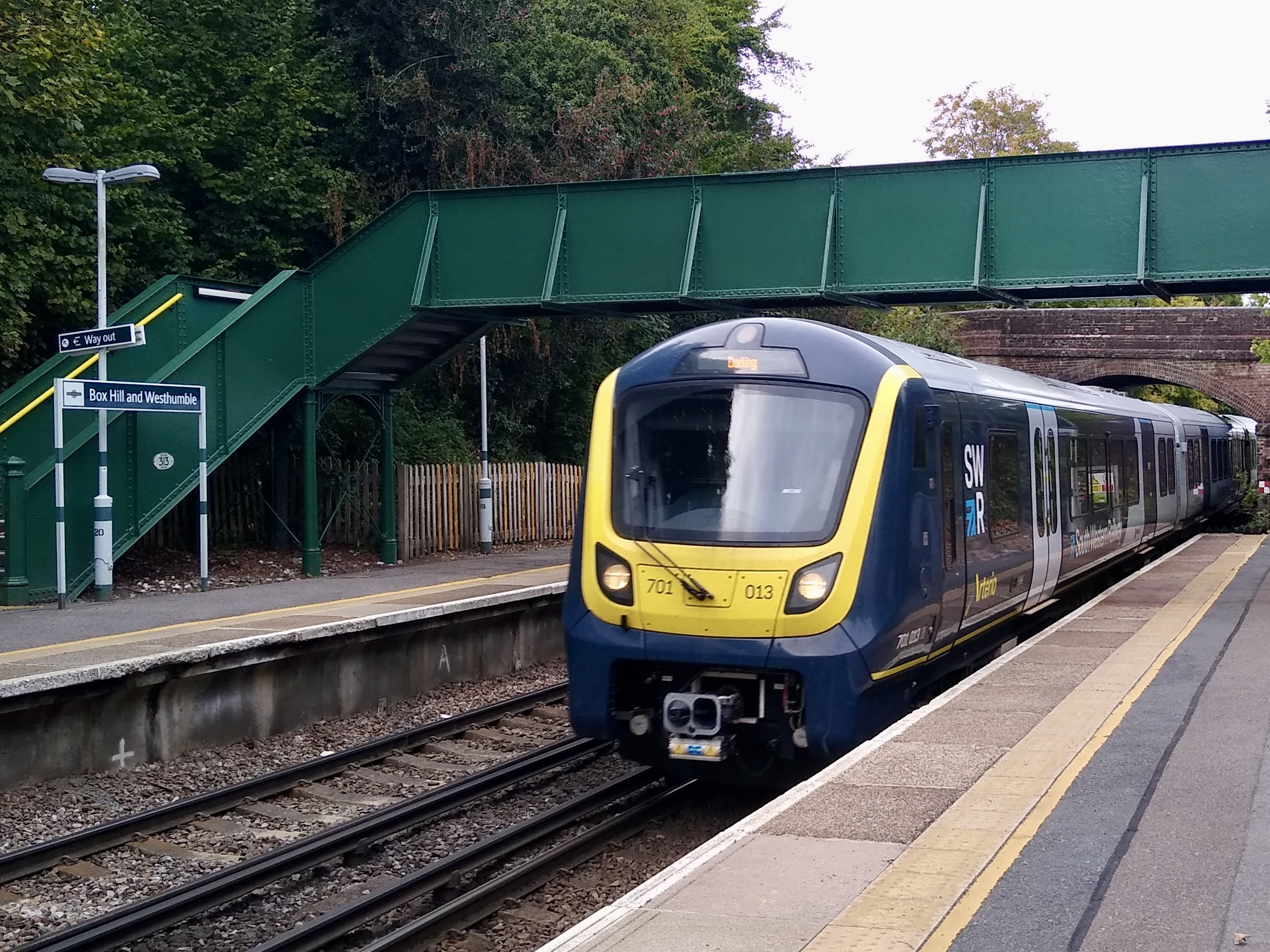
A South Western Railway service to Dorking, operated by a Class 701 multiple unit in October 2025.

Services at Box Hill & Westhumble are operated by Southern and South Western Railway using Class 377 and 701 EMUs.

The typical off-peak service in trains per hour is:

- 1 tph to London Victoria via Sutton
- 1 tph to London Waterloo via Wimbledon
- 2 tph to Dorking of which 1 continues to Horsham

In the peak hours, the frequency between London Waterloo and Dorking is doubled to 2tph. On Saturday evenings (after approximately 18:45) and on Sundays, there is no service south of Dorking to Horsham.

Preceding station	National Rail	Following station
Leatherhead	Southern Sutton & Mole Valley Lines	Dorking
Leatherhead	South Western Railway Mole Valley Line	Dorking

== Terrier tank engine ==
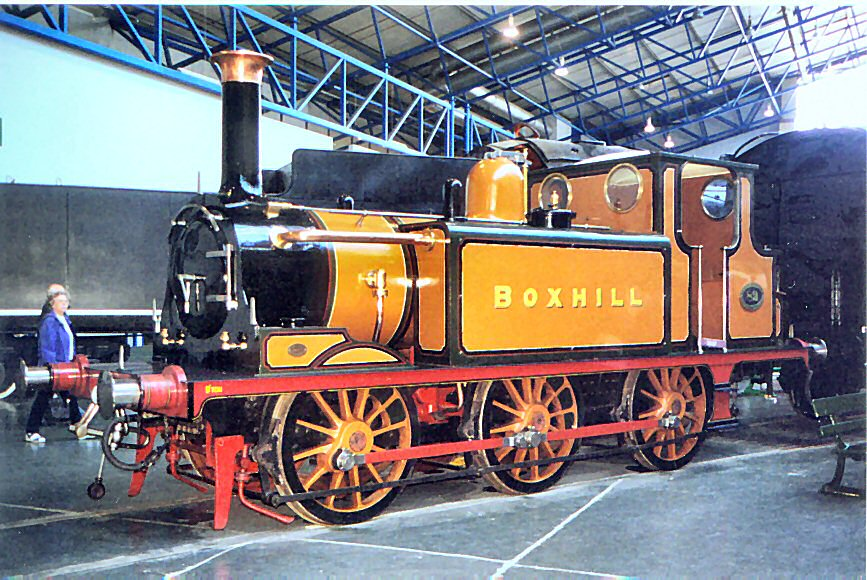
Boxhill is preserved as part of the National Collection at the National Railway Museum.

A Terrier tank engine, built by the LBSCR in 1880, was named Boxhill after the station. It was used to haul commuter trains in South London and Surrey until the 1920s, when it was moved to become a shunting engine at Brighton. Unlike other engines of its class, its smokebox was not modified in the early 20th century, and it was restored by the Southern Railway in 1947 to its original condition and painted in its original Stroudley yellow ochre livery. It is now preserved at the National Railway Museum in York.
