= Guy Spier =

South African-German-Israeli investor

Guy Selmar Spier
- גיא סלמר שפיר
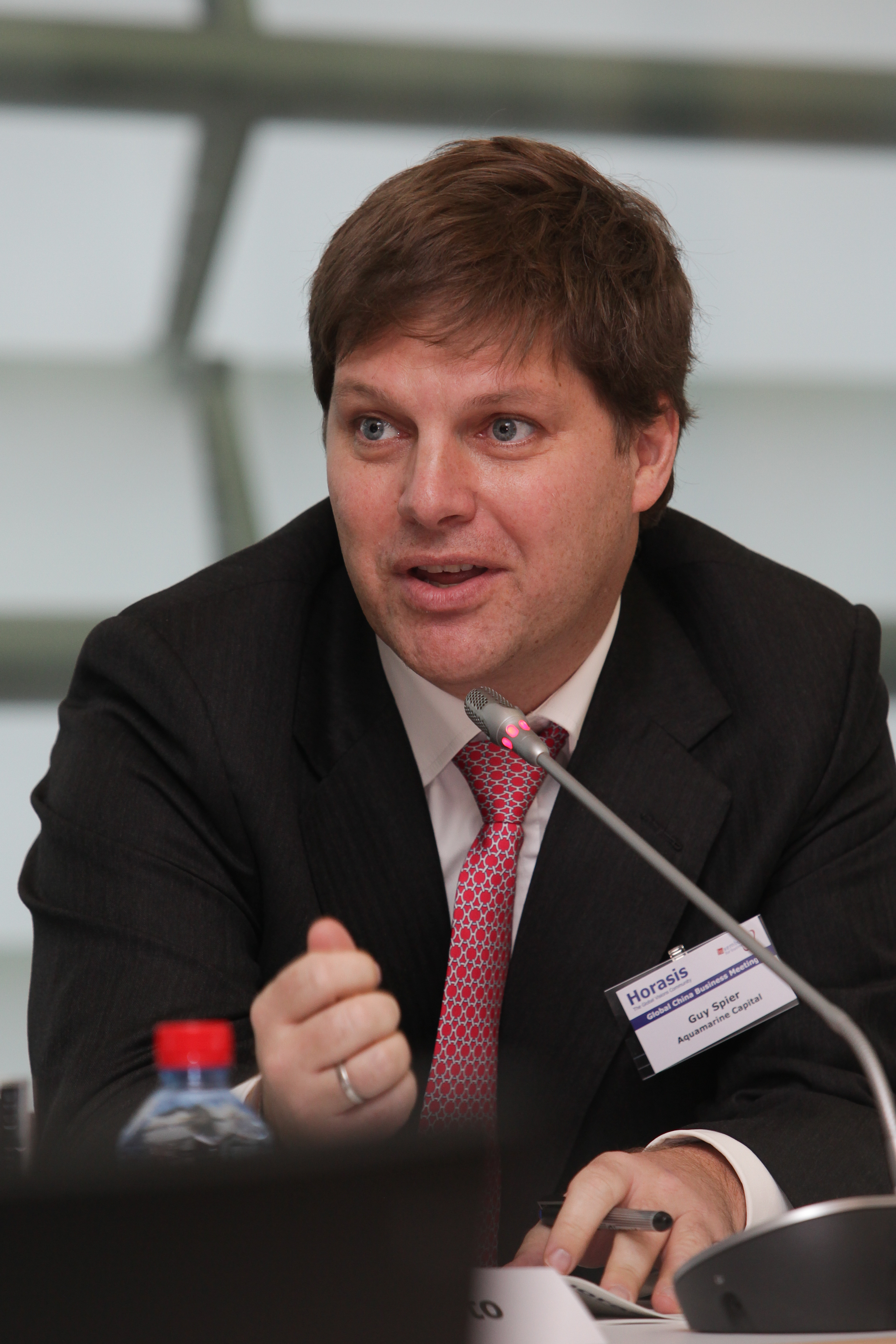
- Born: February 4, 1966 (age 60); Pietermaritzburg, South Africa
- Education: City of London Freemen's School; Brasenose College; Harvard Business School; Heidelberg University
- Occupations: Investor, Aquamarine Fund, Author, Podcaster
- Spouse: Lory Spier (m. 2003)

YouTube information
- Channel: The Education of a Value Investor
- Subscribers: 13 thousand
- Views: 454 thousand
- Last updated: 14 July 2024
- Website: www.guyspier.com

Guy Spier (Hebrew: גיא ספייר; born February 4, 1966) is a Zurich-based Swiss-German-Israeli investor. He is the author of The Education of a Value Investor.

== Education and early life ==
Spier was born in 1966 in Pietermaritzburg, South Africa. When he was three months old, his family moved to Tel Aviv, Israel, where he attended kindergarten. In 1970, his family moved to Iran, where he attended the British Embassy School in Tehran. In 1977, his family moved again to Richmond in the UK, and he attended the City of London Freemen's School, in Ashtead, Surrey, as a weekly boarder. In 1984, he matriculated to study law at Brasenose College, Oxford. Two years later, in 1986, he switched to study PPE (Politics, Philosophy and Economics).

== Career ==
From 1988 to 1990, Spier was an associate at Braxton Associates, the strategy consulting firm which was later sold to Deloitte Consulting. Upon leaving investment banking, Spier founded the Aquamarine Fund.

In 2003, along with David Einhorn, Bill Ackman, and Whitney Tilson, Spier became the target of investigations by Eliot Spitzer, then the New York Attorney General, as well as by the U.S. Securities and Exchange Commission regarding short sales of Farmer Mac, MBIA, and Allied Capital. The meltdown of these companies during the 2008 financial crisis vindicated their short thesis.

In 2016, Spier, along with Phil Town and Matthew Peterson, successfully petitioned Judge Sontchi at the Delaware Court of Bankruptcy to form an official committee of equity holders of Horsehead Holding Corporation which had filed for bankruptcy earlier that year.

== Personal life ==
Spier lives in Zurich with his wife Lory and three children
