= Stella Cunliffe =

British statistician (1917–2012)

Stella Cunliffe MBE
- Born: 12 January 1917; Surrey, England
- Died: 20 January 2012 (aged 95)

Stella Vivian Cunliffe MBE (12 January 1917 – 20 January 2012) was a British statistician. She was the first female president of the Royal Statistical Society.

== Education and early career ==
Cunliffe was educated at Parsons Mead School, Ashtead, Surrey and was Head Girl in 1934. She became the first student to go on to study at university, at the London School of Economics, where she gained a BSc (Econ) and graduated in 1938.

She began her career working from 1939 to 1944 in the Danish Bacon Company. During the Second World War when bacon became rationed in 1940, she was involved in allocating bacon rations for London.

== Guide International Service ==
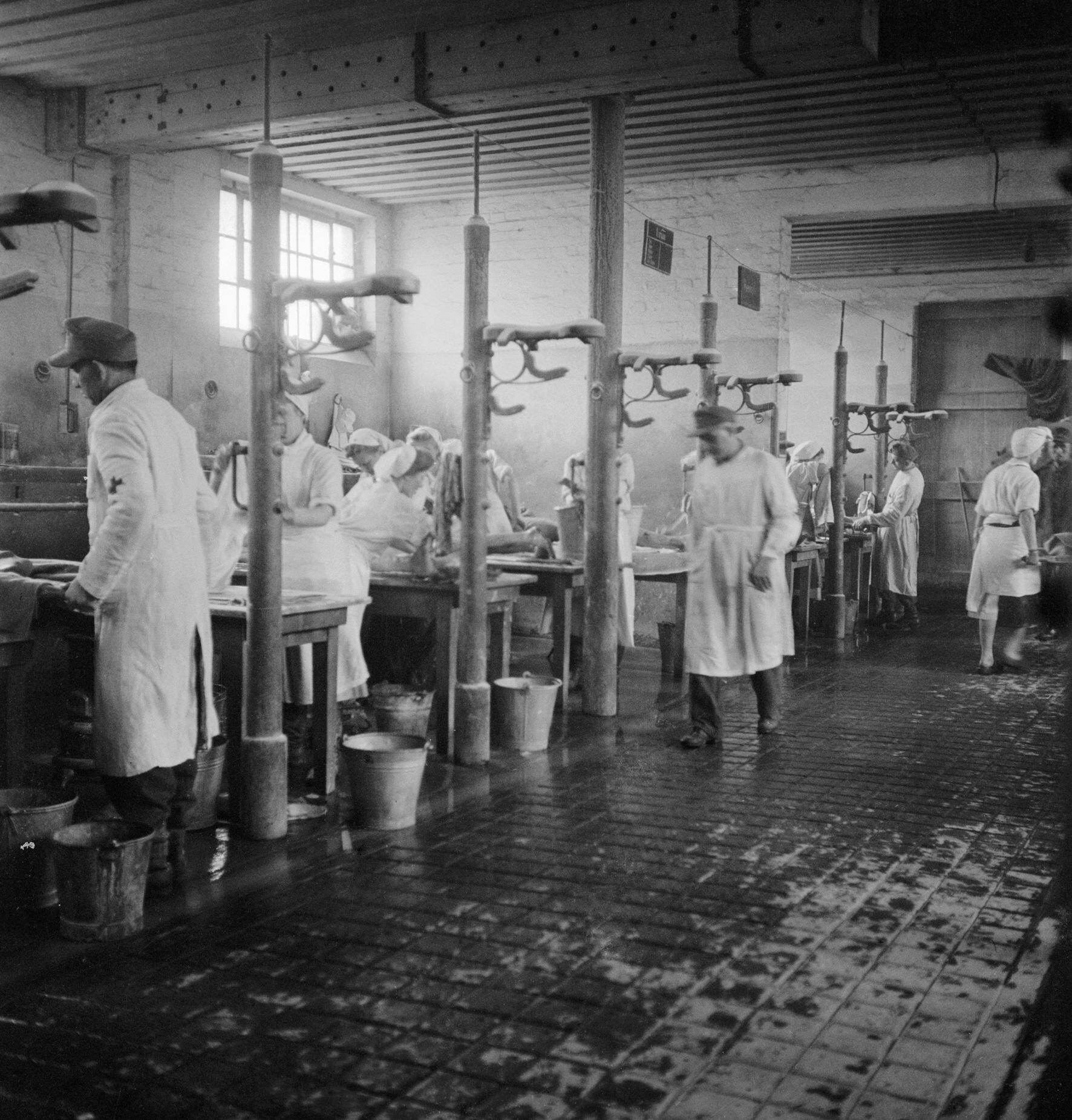
Belsen concentration camp: scene inside the cleansing station, nicknamed the "Human Laundry". The photograph shows some of the 60 tables, each staffed by two German doctors and two German nurses, at which the sick were washed and deloused (April 1945).

At the end of the Second World War, Cunliffe interrupted her career to undertake voluntary relief work in Europe, from 1945 to 1947, with the Guide International Service. The service had been formed from specially trained ex-Girl Guide volunteers to help with the rehabilitation of Europe after the war. Cunliffe was among the first civilians to go into Belsen Concentration Camp in 1945, where the volunteers oversaw the so-called "human laundry", the delousing of the inmates.

== Statistical career ==
In 1947 Cunliffe resumed her professional career by accepting a post as statistician at the Dublin brewers Arthur Guinness Son & Co., where she worked until 1970. In 1955 she took on the role of head of the statistics department. In this role, she developed important principles of experimental methods that are taught to this day. In the most famous example, she redesigned the instructions for quality control workers who were tasked to either accept or reject handmade beer barrels. Before Cunliffe's redesign, workers accepted barrels by rolling them downhill and rejected barrels by pushing them uphill, the more difficult task; thus, workers were biased to accept barrels even if they were flawed. Cunliffe redesigned the quality control work station so that it was equally easy to reject or accept a barrel, eliminating the prior bias and saving Guinness money in the process. She was informed that due to a policy of only appointing men to the Board of Directors, she would not be made director despite her long career and experimental work.

In 1970 she became Head of Research Unit at the Home Office, before in 1972 being appointed Director of Statistics at the Home Office, a post she held until 1977. She was the first woman to reach this grade in the British Government Statistical Service. During her time at the Home Office she expanded the department's statistical and support staff, and established a dedicated computing team. She acknowledged problems with migration figures, after an error was discovered where the number of passengers leaving the country had been overcounted. As a result, she set up an inquiry led by Claus Moser, the head of the Central Statistical Office at the time. She was a prison visitor, and promoted the use of statistics in criminal justice policy. She presented the Home Secretary, Roy Jenkins, with international comparisons to show that capital punishment had no effect on murder rates.

After compulsory retirement from the Civil Service at the age of 60, she was later Statistical Adviser to the Committee of Enquiry into the Engineering Profession from 1978 to 1980. She was a consultant at the University of Kent with the Applied Statistics Research Unit

She served as the first female President of the Royal Statistical Society from 1975 to 1977. Cunliffe stated in her Presidential address she hoped she was elected "primarily as a statistician who happens to be a woman".

== Presidential Address to the RSS ==
- Interaction Journal of the Royal Statistical Society. Series A (General), Vol. 139, No. 1. (1976), pp. 1–19.

== Honours ==
Cunliffe was appointed MBE in 1993, for services to the Guides and the community in Surrey.

== Other activities ==
Cunliffe's other activities included work with youth organisations, gardening and prison after-care. She served as a Mole Valley District Councillor from 1981 to 1999, chaired the local Community Health Council, and served as Chair of Governors for Parsons Mead School.
