= City of London Freemen's School =

Private school in Surrey, England

City of London Freemen's School (CLFS)

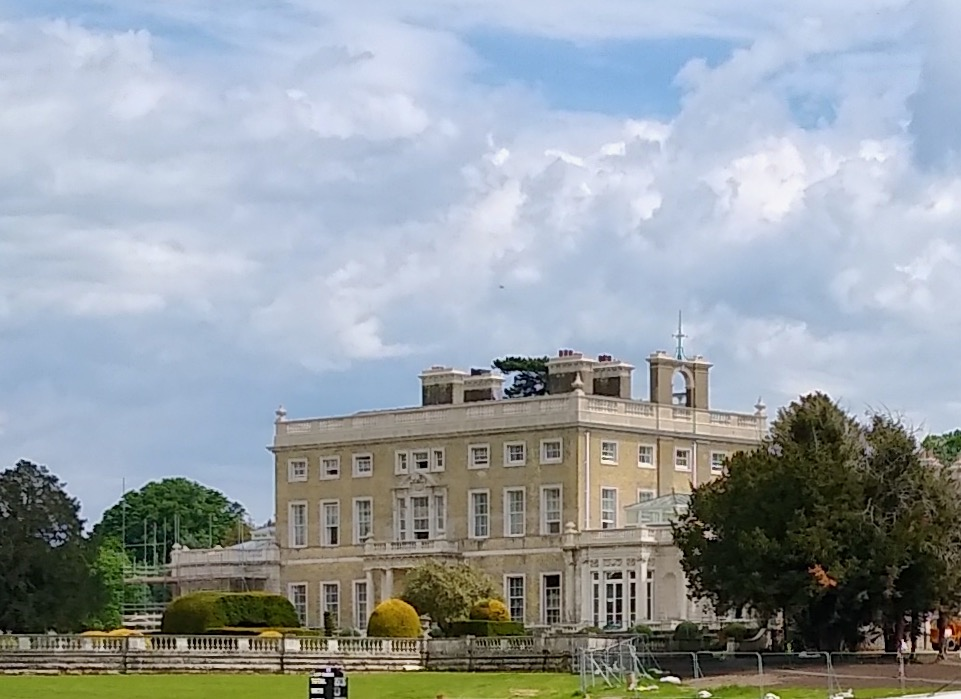
- The front elevation of the school's main building, Ashtead Park House

Location
- Ashtead Park; Ashtead, Surrey, KT21 1ET; England; 51°18′28″N 00°17′14″W

Information
- Type: Independent school Day and Boarding school
- Motto: Latin: Domine Dirige Nos
- Religious affiliation: Some Christian Traditions - with a Reverend at school
- Established: 1854
- Department for Education URN: 125349 Tables
- Headmaster: Roland Martin
- Staff: ≈ 208
- Gender: Co-educational
- Age: 7 (Year 3) to 18 (Sixth Form)
- Enrolment: 971
- Houses: Hale, Gresham and Whittington
- Colours: Red and White
- Alumni: Old Freemen's
- Website: www.freemens.org

City of London Freemen's School (CLFS) is a co-educational private school for day and boarding pupils, located at Ashtead Park in Surrey, England. It is a partner school of the City of London School and the City of London School for Girls, which are both independent single-sex schools located within the City of London itself. All three schools receive funding from the City's Cash. The school's head is a member of the Headmasters' and Headmistresses' Conference.

The Good Schools Guide described the school as "A traditional academic and sporty school in a stunning setting with impressive facilities but not at all elitist – in fact quite the opposite." In 2024, 33% of grades in A Levels were A* and 72% of grades were A*-A. In GCSEs, 40% of grades were 9, 67% were 8-9 (equivalent to A*) and 86% achieved 9-7 in GCSEs.

Freemen’s is recognised in the top 25 co-ed private schools in England.

== History ==
Foundation of a School for Orphans of Freemen of the City of London Act 1850
- Act of Parliament
- Parliament of the United Kingdom
- Long title: An Act for establishing a School for Orphans of Freemen of the City of London.
- Citation: 13 & 14 Vict. c. 10

Dates
- Royal assent: 14 August 1850

Status: Current legislation

Text of statute as originally enacted

The school was founded in 1854 by the Corporation of London, and was originally located in Brixton, London to educate orphans of freemen of the city. It is still possible for such children to be educated as "Foundationers" at the school with the costs of their education borne by the City of London Corporation. The school is set in 57 acres (230,000 m^{2}) of Ashtead Park in Surrey, having moved from Brixton to Ashtead in 1926.

== Boarding house ==
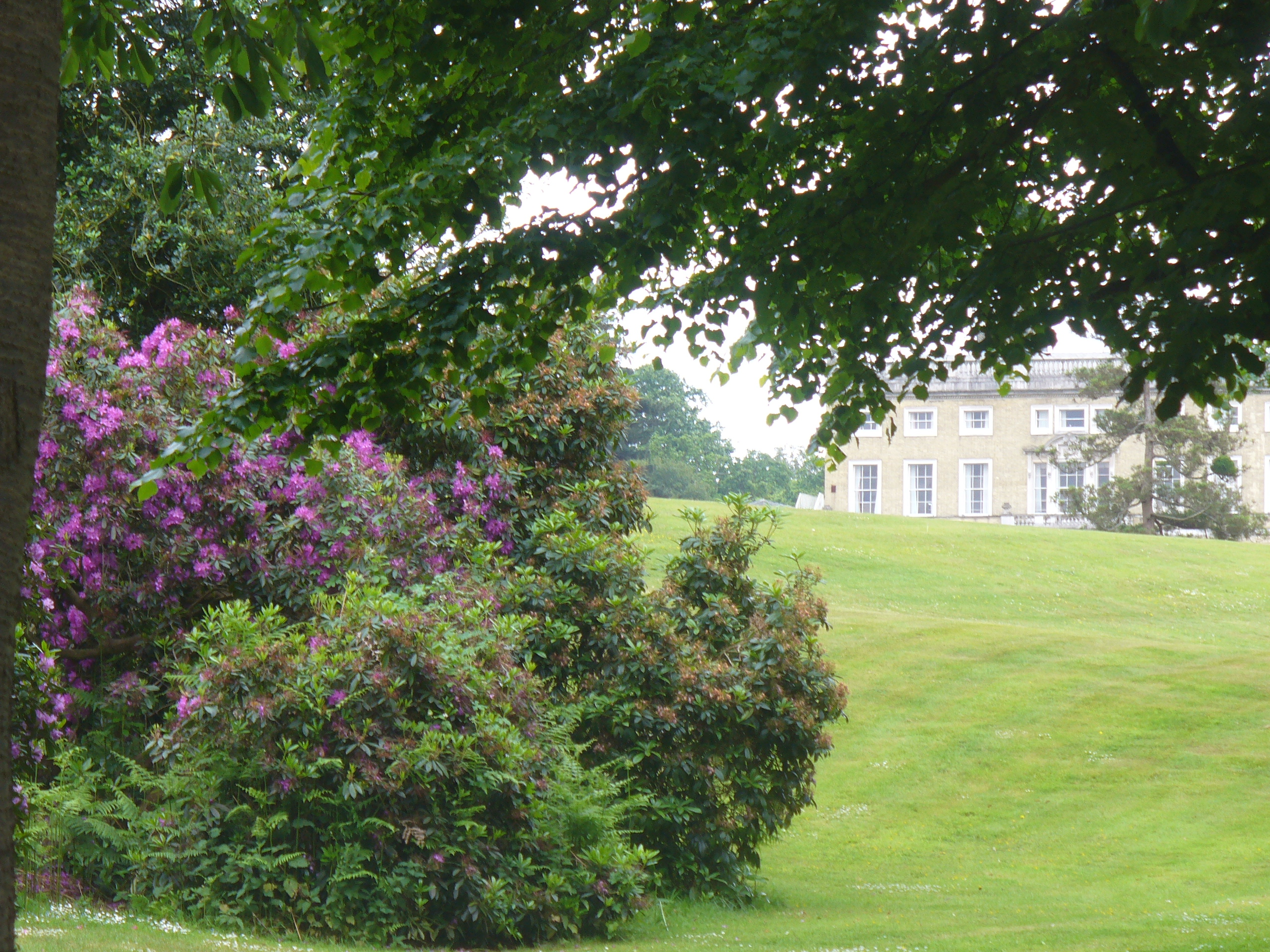
Ashtead Park House, viewed from Ashtead Park

The boarding house, known as the Walbrook, is located right next to the Music Block and welcomes international students as well as domestic students. The Boarding House shares a very similar design to the Music Block.

== Old Freemen’s ==
Once pupils leave school they become part of Old Freemen’s Association, which includes the Old Freemen's Rugby Football Club, Cricket Club and Hockey Club. There is also a Guild of Scholars of the City of London, which was formed to encourage former pupils from the three ‘City schools’ to develop links with the City of London. Membership is open to all former pupils, staff, and retired staff, who must have obtained their ‘Freedom of the City of London’ but there is no subscription.

In addition any pupil aged 14–17 who is still at school may apply to become an apprentice to a Freeman of the City. They will then be entitled, at the age of 21, to apply for the Freedom of the City and membership of the Guild of Scholars.

== Notable alumni ==
Former pupils are known as Old Freemen. Some better known Old Freemen include:

- Rory Burns - Surrey County Cricket Club and England cricketer
- Andrew Garfield - actor, appeared in the film The Amazing Spider-Man and others
- Warwick Davis - actor, star of Willow, also appeared in the Star Wars and Harry Potter movie series
- Simon Cowell (presenter) - presenter of Animal Planet and Wildlife SOS
- Andrew Goddard - gastroenterologist
- Ashley Mote - former UKIP MEP
- Anders Nielsen - badminton player
- Alexandra Rickham - Paralympic sailor
- Guy Spier - investor
- Joe Strummer - lead singer of punk rock band the Clash; real name John Mellor
- Gavin Turk - one of the Young British Artists
- Andy Ward - progressive rock drummer best known for playing in Camel in the 1970s
- Peter George - former chief executive of Hilton Group PLC
