= Ashtead Park =

Nature reserve in Ashtead, Surrey, England

Coordinates: 51.313°N 0.291°W

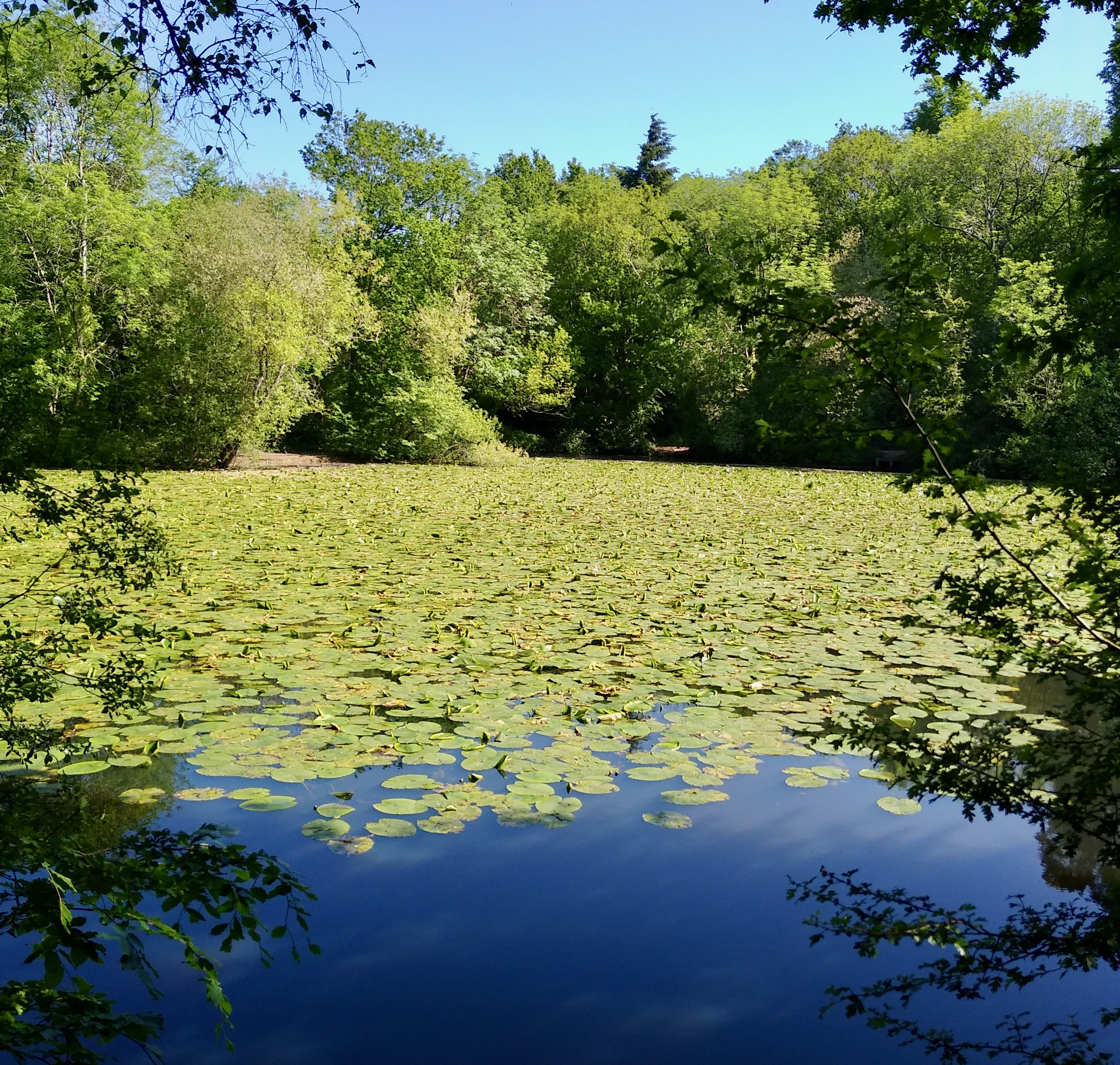
- Upper Pond
- Interactive map of Ashtead Park
- Type: Local Nature Reserve
- Location: Ashtead, Surrey
- OS grid: TQ 192 585
- Area: 24.2 hectares (60 acres)

Ashtead Park is a 24.2-hectare (60-acre) Local Nature Reserve in Ashtead in Surrey. It is owned by Mole Valley District Council. It contains several important listed buildings. The Park itself has remains of a Roman building, four lakes/ponds and the school's playing fields and is Grade II listed on the Register of Historic Parks and Gardens.

== History ==
=== Ashtead Park Manor ===
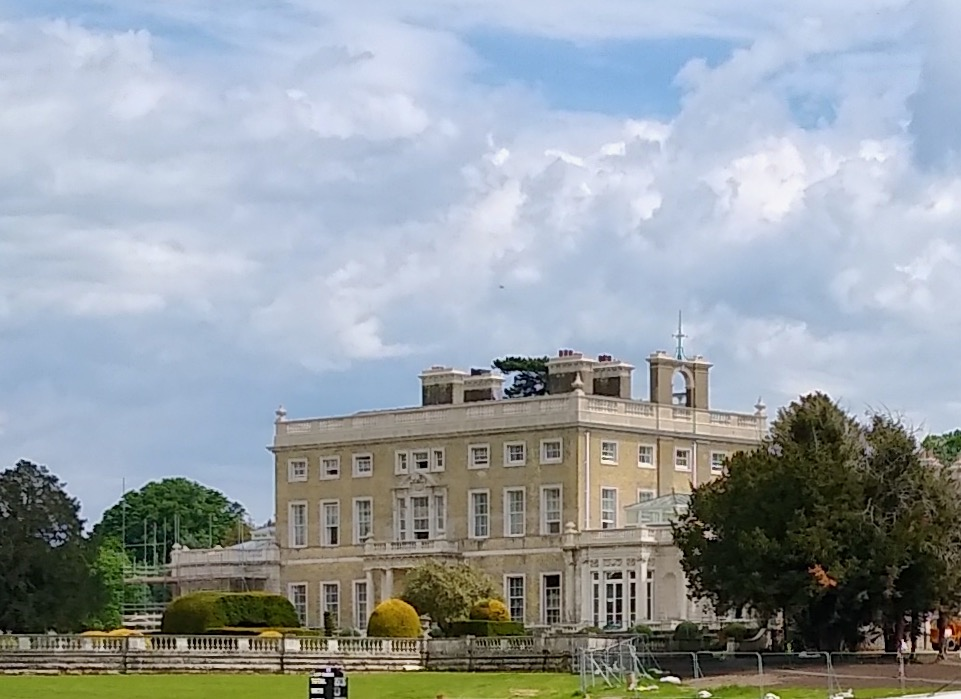
Ashtead Park House

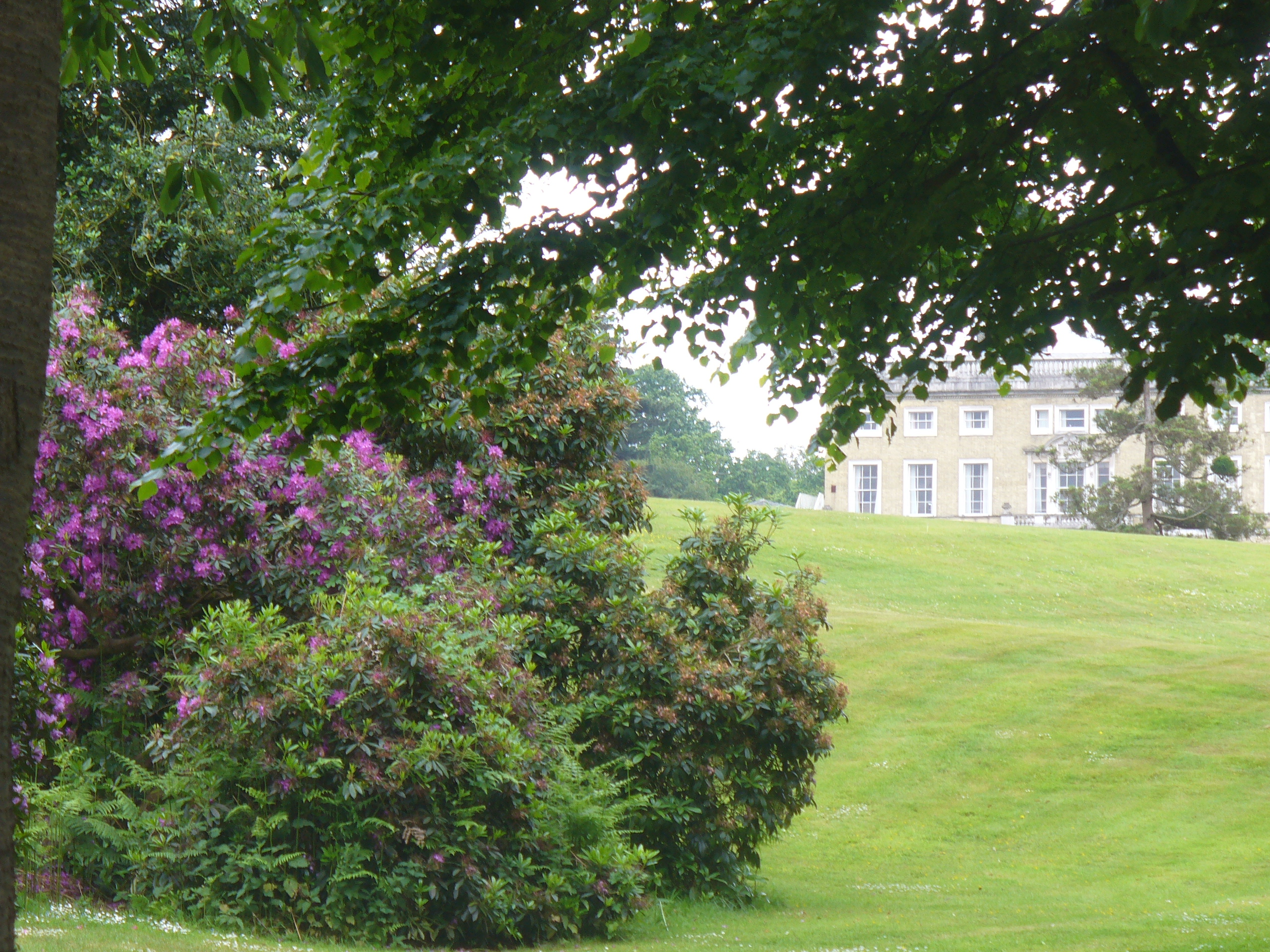
Ashtead Park showing a view of the school

In 1563, Queen Elizabeth I granted the manor at Ashtead to Henry Fitzalan, 12th Earl of Arundel. It passed into the hands of the Howard family through his daughter Lady Mary FitzAlan, who married Thomas Howard, 4th Duke of Norfolk. Their son, Philip Howard, 13th Earl of Arundel, inherited his grandfather's land and title, uniting the Howards with the Arundel estates. Owing to their Catholic faith, the Howards later had their titles and lands attainted by Elizabeth, but they were restored in 1603 when the Stuarts took the throne.

In 1680, Henry Howard, 7th Duke of Norfolk sold Ashtead to a distant cousin Sir Robert Howard (son of Thomas Howard, 1st Earl of Berkshire), a playwright who lived primarily in London. At this time, the manor house was a timber building of "considerable antiquity" dating no later than the time of Henry VII or Henry VIII. Sir Robert "erected a noble residence" and a park, enclosed with a wall, finished in 1684. It was built in a typical Restoration style. A sketch of his mansion is visible in the background of Sir Godfrey Kneller's oil painting of Lady Diana Feilding, daughter of the Earl of Bradford and wife of Sir Robert's only son, Thomas Howard.

He also planted considerable numbers of trees, including a wych elm that was 40 feet in circumference two centuries later. A lime tree, reported as the finest in England, was destroyed by winds in 1871. Before his death in 1698, Sir Robert received Charles II and his two successors, James II and William III, at the house, and the original table at which they dined was preserved.

=== Ashtead Park House ===
Ashtead was inherited eventually by William Howard, Viscount Andover, heir of the Henry Bowes Howard, 11th Earl of Suffolk and 4th Earl of Berkshire. Andover was killed in an accident in 1756. His male line failed following the deaths of the 12th and 13th Earls in 1779. Ashtead Park was inherited by Lord Andover's daughter Frances, who in 1783 married Richard Bagot (son of Sir Walter Bagot, 5th Baronet and brother of William Bagot, 1st Baron Bagot), who adopted the Howard surname.

By this time, the mansion built by Sir Robert Howard in the 1680s needed such extensive repairs that Richard Bagot Howard decided to rebuild a new one on the same site. A large basement was excavated, and this soil allowed the new mansion to be considerably raised. Howard commissioned architect Samuel Wyatt to develop its grand façade from earlier designs by Joseph Bonomi (1739–1808), who had frequently stayed at Ashtead. At age 14, Wyatt had been taken to Rome by Richard's brother Lord Bagot to study architecture and painting under the care of a master named Vicentini.

On 17 September 1790, the foundation stone was laid down by Richard and Frances' only surviving child, Mary (1785–1877). The new mansion is three storeys with a white brick exterior with stone dressings. A south portico opens into a circular saloon enriched with scagliola pillars. The drawing room includes a white marble chimney piece designed by Piranesi.

Mary Howard eventually inherited the house. She married Col. Hon. Fulke Greville Upton, who also took the name Howard. Mary Howard died in 1877 at Ashtead, aged 92, without children, ending centuries of the Howard line at Ashtead. The house was sold in 1880 along with its entire contents, including paintings by Rembrandt, Sir Joshua Reynolds, Sir Anthony van Dyck, Sir Peter Lely, Sir Godfrey Kneller, and Salvator Rosa.

The house was bought by Sir Thomas Lucas, 1st Baronet in 1880 and enlarged and altered at major expense. Lucas sold it to Pantia Ralli in 1889. Following Ralli's death, the house was acquired by the City of London Corporation in 1924 and since then has been occupied by the City of London Freemen's School. The house is listed as Grade II.

=== Headmasters House ===
Headmasters House is an architecturally imposing red brick development which also forms part of the school campus.

== Ecology ==
The nature reserve was formerly part of the park of Ashtead House. It is mainly woodland on heavy London Clay and it has two ponds. Fauna include the broad-bodied chaser and emperor dragonfly and the common blue damselfly.
