= Parsons Mead School =

Location
- Ottways Lane; Ashtead, Surrey; KT21 2PE; England; 51.306°N 0.306°W

Information
- Type: Independent, girls, day and boarding
- Motto: Success Through Excellence
- Established: 1897
- Closed: 7 July 2006
- Affiliation: Church of England

Parsons Mead School was a private girls school founded by Jessie Elliston in Ashtead, Surrey, England, which existed from 1897 to 2006.

== Founder ==
Jessie Elliston (1858–1942) was born in Bridgnorth, Shropshire. The family moved to Leighton Buzzard in Bedfordshire, where she grew up. After her mother died and her father remarried, Elliston decided she would have to make her own way in life. She became a governess and worked for many wealthy families, including the Bonham Carters, teaching the children until they were ready for boarding school. She finally moved to Leatherhead Vicarage, where she came on the recommendation of Mrs. Bonham Carter who was related to Mrs. Utterton. When the Utterton children no longer needed a governess, it was Canon Utterton who suggested a change of course by starting her own school. By this date, Elliston was in her late 30s, with little money, and battling against deafness; but did have her years of experience teaching children.

== History ==
The school was established in Ashtead in 1897 to prepare the daughters of gentlemen for home life. Elliston began the venture with an aunt, Eleanora Elliston, one of her father's sisters, but the partnership was not a success: Eleanora left one night, having taken all the capital, about £200, out of the bank, leaving Jessie penniless. Parents and friends came to the rescue with some financial support.

In 1901, Elliston moved the school to larger premises in a house called Claverton, which was by the cricket field on Woodfield Lane, Ashtead. (Retirement flats now occupy the site, but the estate retains the name Claverton.) By 1904, the school needed to move again, and Elliston rented Parsons Mead, Ottways Lane, a large house built in the 1860s. The name reflects the location's history as a meadow owned by the local clergy.

As the school grew, the 1860s house was extended and new buildings added. The curriculum expanded from domestic and art courses to a full range of subjects including science and maths.

In 1957, the school ceased to be privately owned and was made an educational trust.

== Crisis and closure ==
In July 2005, all but two members of the Parson's Mead Educational Trust resigned and were replaced by directors of the Vernon Educational Trust (operators of Danes Hill School in Oxshott), a change that was later said to be part of a rescue plan, with the alternative being to sell the school to a private firm. The rescue plan was not successful and Parsons Mead closed on 7 July 2006, a month after the announcement of its closure. The school's new trustees said they were unable to keep Parsons Mead going after the number of pupils fell below the break-even point.

Parents asked the Charity Commission to begin an inquiry in June 2006, accusing the trust of running down Parsons Mead so that its assets could be used for another school. The accusation was denied by a spokesperson for the Parsons Mead Educational Trust. The Charity Commission issued a response on 17 November 2006, stating "There do not appear to be any issues that merit the opening of an Inquiry or further investigation".

The Chairwoman of Parsons Mead Trust was former Conservative education minister Dame Angela Rumbold, who said that the remaining assets would be put in a trust to provide financial help to local families seeking independent education for their children.

The Vernon Educational Trust and the Parsons Mead Educational Trust were formally merged in August 2006. The Vernon Educational Trust therefore took ownership of the Parson's Mead School site, along with £2.2 million in liabilities. The Vernon Educational Trust sold the site to Oracle Homes Residential Ltd in August 2007 for £16 million under section 36 of the Charities Act. There was press speculation over whether Danes Hill School would benefit from the sale.

Demolition of Parsons Mead School commenced in September 2009, the site having been sold on from Oracle Homes to Bewley Homes.

== Notable former pupils ==
- Teresa Banham, actress
- Stella Cunliffe, first female President of the Royal Statistical Society (1975–7)
- Joan Hassall, artist
- Lucy Schwob (Claude Cahun), surrealist photographer and writer
- Helen Woods (Anna Kavan), writer
