= Ashtead =

Village in Surrey, England

Coordinates: 51°18′36″N 0°17′56″W

- Village
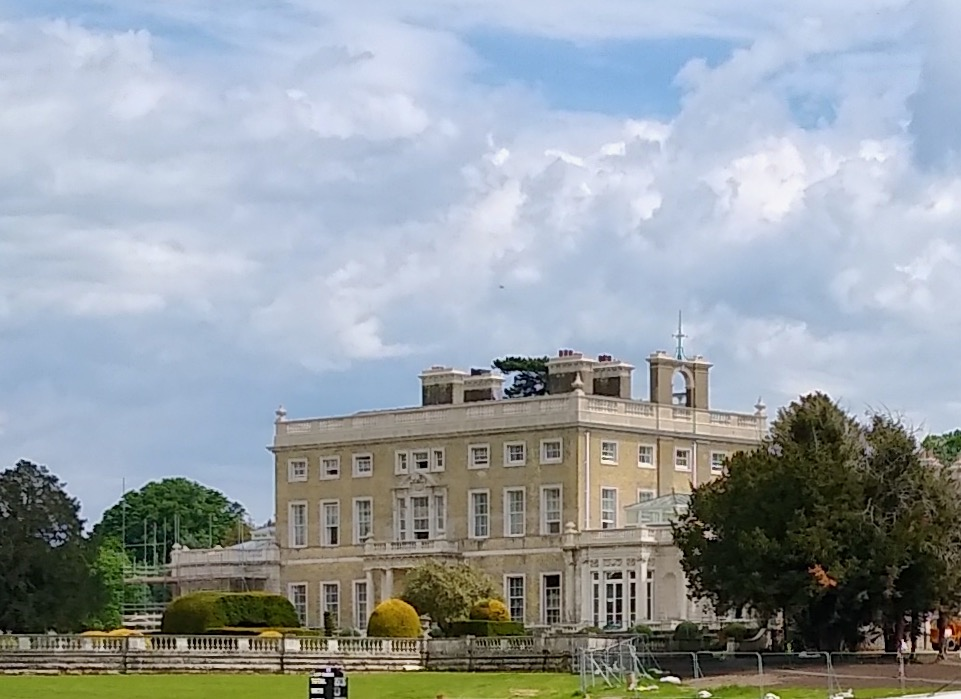
- Ashtead Park House, a school since the 1920s

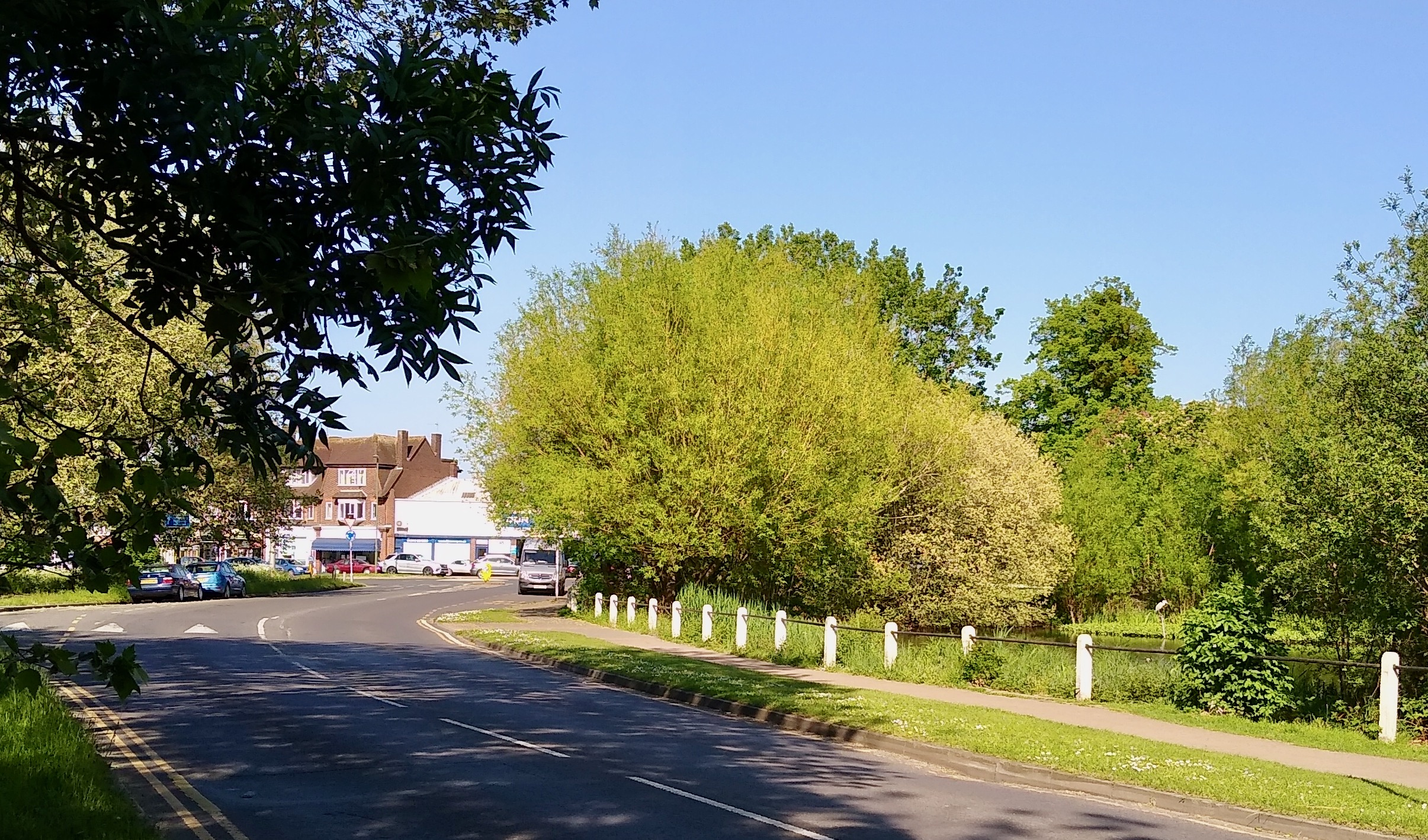
- Barnett Wood Lane with pond to the right

- Location within Surrey
- Area: 11.59 km^{2} (4.47 sq mi)
- Population: 14,169 (2011 census)
  - Density: 1,223/km^{2} (3,170/sq mi)
- OS grid reference: TQ1858
- Civil parish: n/a
- District: Mole Valley
- Shire county: Surrey
- Region: South East
- Country: England
- Sovereign state: United Kingdom
- Post town: Ashtead
- Postcode district: KT21
- Dialling code: 01372
- Police: Surrey
- Fire: Surrey
- Ambulance: South East Coast
- UK Parliament: Epsom and Ewell

Ashtead /ˈæʃtɛd/ is a village in the Mole Valley district of Surrey, England, approximately 16 miles (26 kilometres) south of central London. Ashtead is on the single-carriageway A24 between Epsom and Leatherhead. The village is on the northern slopes of the North Downs and is in the catchment area of The Rye, a tributary of the River Mole.

The earliest archaeological evidence for human activity in the village is from the Stone Age. At several points in its history, including during the early Roman period, Ashtead has been a centre for brick and tile manufacture. From medieval times until the late 19th century, Ashtead was primarily an agricultural settlement. Residential development was catalysed by the opening of the railway line between Epsom and Leatherhead in 1859 and by the breakup of the Ashtead Park estate in the 1880s. Housebuilding continued into the 20th century, reaching a peak in the 1930s. Future expansion is now constrained by the Metropolitan Green Belt, which encircles the village.

There are two nature reserves in the village: Ashtead Common, to the north west of the centre, forms part of a Site of Special Scientific Interest and is owned by the Corporation of London; Ashtead Park, to the east of the centre is a Local Nature Reserve owned by the District Council.

== Toponymy ==
In Domesday Book, Ashtead is recorded as Stede, which simply means "place". In later documents, the village appears as Estede, Akestede and Aschestede (13th century), Asshstede (1370s), Ashstede (14th century), Asshested (15th century), Asted (1790) and Ashsted (1820). The name is generally agreed to mean "place of ash trees". (Note: The suffix ‑stead or ‑sted occurs in the names of a number of Surrey settlements, including Banstead, Elstead and Oxted.)

== Geography ==
=== Location and topography ===
Ashtead is a large village in the Mole Valley district of Surrey, approximately 25 km (16 mi) south of central London. It lies on the southern edge of the London Basin and the highest point in the parish is 129.5 m (425 ft) above ordnance datum. Both the Epsom to Leatherhead railway line and the A24 run from northeast to southwest through the settlement, broadly parallel to The Rye, a tributary of the River Mole.

The Mole Valley Local Plan 2020–2039, adopted by Mole Valley District Council in October 2024, identifies Ashtead as a "suburban village". However in April 2025, Benjamin Webb, an inspector working for the Planning Inspectorate, wrote in a planning appeal decision that, for the purpose of his assessment, "Ashtead is in practice a small town". He commented that "the modern settlement was established through substantial suburban expansion around a preexisting village" and stated that "Ashtead now bears little resemblance to a village as generally understood".

The historic core of Ashtead is known locally as "The Village" and is focused around the main shopping area along The Street (A24). The residential area to the north west, closer to the railway station, is known as "Lower Ashtead" and incorporates secondary shopping centres on Craddocks Parade and Barnett Wood Lane. (Note: Historically, the term 'Lower Ashtead' was used exclusively for the area bordered by Barnett Wood Lane, Agates Lane, Ottways Lane and Harriots Lane, corresponding to the land of the former manor of Little Ashtead.)

There are two protected nature reserves in Ashtead: Ashtead Common, a 181 ha (450-acre) woodland, is owned and managed by the City of London Corporation and is to the north west of Lower Ashtead; the 54 ha (130-acre) Ashtead Park is to the east of The Village and is owned by Mole Valley District Council.

=== Geology ===
Like many of the villages between Croydon and Guildford, Ashtead is a spring line settlement. It is positioned at the point where the chalk of the North Downs dips beneath the London Clay. The chalk is a natural aquifer and numerous wells have been bored into the ground to obtain drinking water. Springs rise at several points along the boundary between the permeable and impermeable ground, some of which feed The Rye and its tributaries, while others feed the ponds on the Common and in the Park.

== History ==
=== Pre-history ===
The earliest evidence of human activity is from the Paleolithic and Mesolithic periods. A backed blade made of flint, dating from 50,000 to 12,000 years before present (BP), was found during pipeline excavations in Lower Ashtead, near Barnett Wood Lane and tranchet axes, dating from 15,000 to 5000 BP, have been discovered in Ottways Lane and Glebe Road. During the demolition of Parsons Mead School in 2009, pottery from the Neolithic was found which contained charcoal that was radiocarbon dated to 3775-3659 BP. Bronze Age artefacts discovered in the village include a spearhead and pottery sherds.

=== Roman and Saxon ===
Ashtead was the site of a major Roman brickworks in the 1st and 2nd centuries AD. The site on Ashtead Common consisted of a corridor villa and kilns adjacent to a series of claypits. A bath house was also provided for the use of the workers. The complex was excavated in the 1920s and it is now protected by scheduled monument status.

Bricks and tiles produced in Ashtead were most likely transported via a short branch road to Stane Street, the Roman road that runs to the south east of the village centre. Remains of a building close to St Giles' Church, suggest that Roman occupation of Ashtead continued into the 4th century.

Although there is no archaeological evidence of Anglo-Saxon occupation in the village, Ashtead would have been administered as part of the Copthorne Hundred. There may have been a small chapel, likely to have been controlled by a minster at Leatherhead, which was a royal vill. In 1984, an Anglo-Saxon cemetery was discovered on the site of the former Goblin factory in Ermyn Way, Leatherhead (now the location of the offices of Esso). Excavations uncovered the remains of at least 40 individuals and the artefacts found, including knives, buckles and necklaces, suggest that they were pagan burials.

=== Medieval ===
Ashtead appears in the Domesday Book as Stede and was held by the Canons of Bayeux from the Bishop of Bayeux. Its assets were: three hides and one virgate; 16 ploughs, woodland for seven hogs and four acres (1.6 ha) of meadow. In total, it rendered £12 per year.

The de Warenne Family, the Earls of Surrey, held the manor in the 12th century. In the second half of the 13th century, it passed to the de Montfort family. During the Second Barons' War (1264–1267), Ashtead men are known to have fought on the side of Simon de Montfort. The de Montforts and their descendants continued to own the manor until the death of Baldwin de Freville in 1419, when it passed to his brother-in-law, Sir Roger Aston. Ashtead passed through several generations of the Aston family until 1543, when Edward Aston returned the manor to the Crown in exchange for land in Stafford and Derby.

During the late 14th century, tile manufacturing was again taking place on Ashtead Common. Records from the Manor of Banstead indicate that a "Henry the Tyler of Asshstede" supplied over 10,000 roof tiles in 1372–3, and in 1384 the same individual also supplied the lord of the manor of Ashtead with tiles for "The Lord's Kitchen." It is possible that, during the 1290s, the tiles for the building of Pacchesham Manor, Leatherhead, were also manufactured on Ashtead Common. There is no mention of Henry the Tyler after 1400, and it seems likely that the medieval tileworks closed around this time.

The area now bordered by Barnett Wood Lane, Agates Lane, Ottways Lane and Harriots Lane, was formerly a separate manor called Little Ashtead, which was held by Merton Priory in the Middle Ages. Following the dissolution of the monasteries in the mid-16th century, the area was known as Prior's Farm.

=== Early modern ===
Documents surviving from the mid-17th century, detail the organisation of the manor during the reign of Charles II: Two common fields, together totalling 194 ha (479 acres) and representing around 30% of the cultivatable land in the village, were divided into strips of around 1 acre each. The strips were distributed between 52 families and the planting would have been regulated by the manor court. In 1656, 17 of these strips were held by the rector and provided an income for the parish priest. The remainder of the cultivatable land had already been enclosed and was either held by the Lords of the Manor or by other prominent individuals, including the Stydolf family of Norbury Park.

Ashtead is mentioned twice in Samuel Pepys' diaries. Part of his entry for 25 July 1663 reads:

"I went towards Ashted, my old place of pleasure... and there we got a lodging in a little hole we could not stand upright in, but rather than go further to look we staid there, and while supper was getting ready I took him to walk up and down behind my cozen [cousin] Pepys's house... and so up and down in the closes, which I know so well methinks, and account it good fortune that I lie here that I may have opportunity to renew my old walks."

For much of the early modern period, Ashtead was owned by the Howard family. Sir Robert Howard purchased the manor from his cousin Henry Howard, the 6th Duke of Norfolk, in 1680 and is credited with transforming the land into a Gentleman's country seat. Sir Robert built a new mansion and also enclosed the surrounding park to create a formal garden. The diarist, John Evelyn, visited the house shortly after it was completed in 1684, admiring the paintings by the Italian-born artist Antonio Verrio and remarking upon the "swete park upon the Downe." Celia Fiennes described the brick-built mansion as having "an abundance of pictures" and "very good tapestry hangings". Sir Robert's guests also included Charles II, James II and William III.

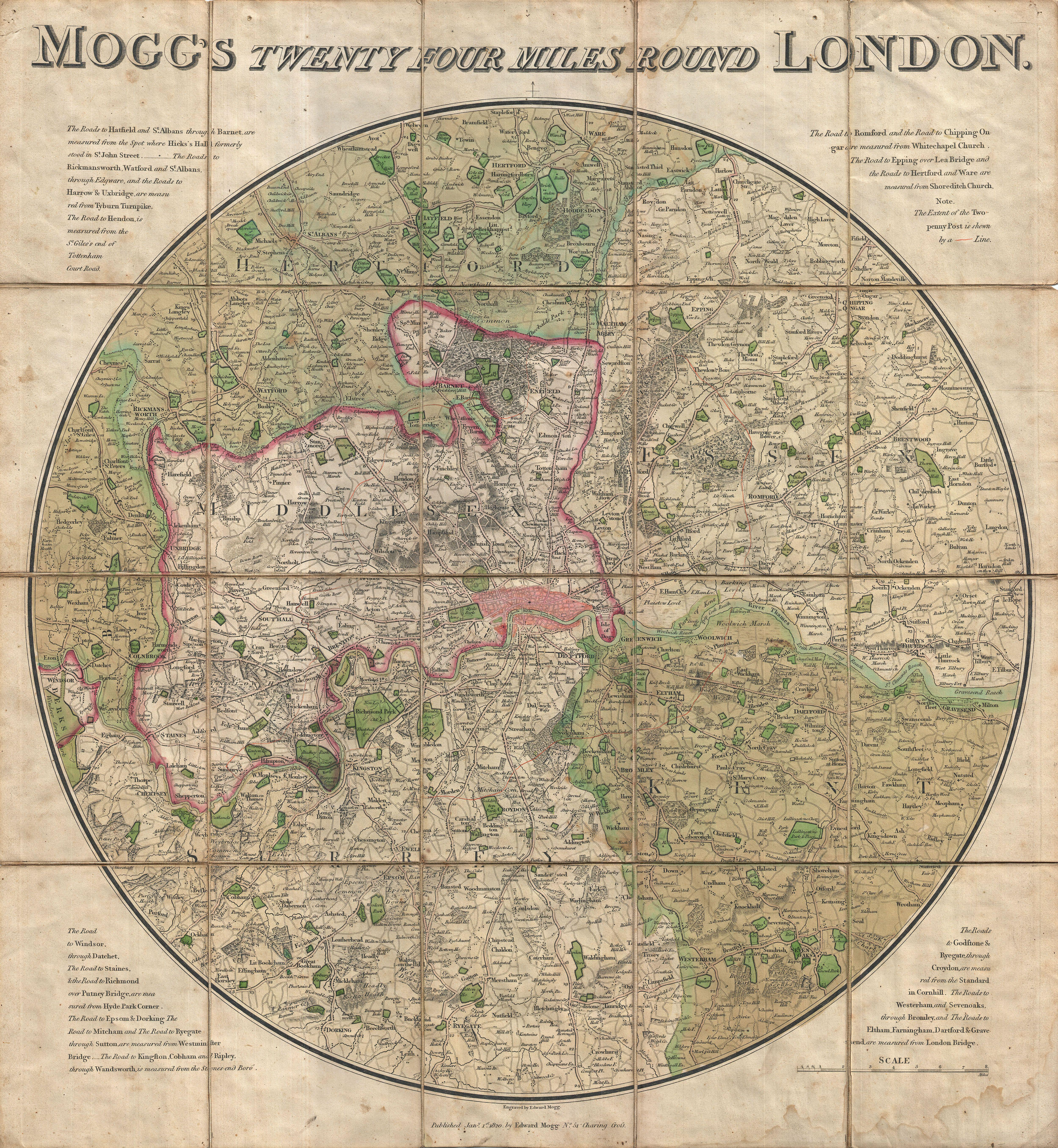
Extract from Mogg's Twenty Four Miles Round London, 1820 showing the turnpike road through Ashtead

The turnpike road between Epsom and Horsham, which ran through Ashtead, was authorised by Parliament in 1755. By the end of the century, stagecoaches were passing through the village several times a day, although it is unlikely that many stopped to pick up passengers and local residents probably walked or rode to Epsom if they wished to use them.

=== 19th century ===
For the first seven decades of the 19th century, Ashtead remained a predominantly farming community. The manor continued to be owned by members of the Howard family and was inherited by Mary Howard in 1818. Mary Howard was a major benefactor to the village and was responsible for founding St Giles' School. She endowed the almshouses and, together with her husband, Fulk Greville Howard, initiated a major redevelopment of the parish church.

In 1825 George Rennie and his brother, John, proposed the construction of The Grand Imperial Ship Canal, between Deptford and Portsmouth, to reduce the transit time from the capital to the south coast from 12 days to 24 hours and to avoid hostile waters in the event of war. The canal would have run across Ashtead Common, along the course of The Rye.

The two common fields were enclosed in 1838, bringing to an end the open-field system in the manor. The land was divided into forty rectangular fields, each of around 4 ha (10 acres), which were leased to local farmers. The glebe strips were taken over by the Howards and the rector was given land to the south of the village centre in compensation. In around 1850, the 92 ha (227 acres) comprising the remaining core of Little Ashtead manor was sold for development, marking the start of a long period of housebuilding in the village.

The railway line through Ashtead was built by the Epsom and Leatherhead Railway Company and opened on 1 February 1859. It was constructed as a single-track line and, on opening, Ashtead railway station had only one platform and trains only stopped by request. Initially all services were operated by the London and South Western Railway (LSWR) and, for the first two months, only ran as far as Epsom. The completion of the line through Worcester Park enabled these trains to be extended to London Waterloo from April of the same year. In August 1859, the London, Brighton and South Coast Railway (LBSCR) began to run trains from Leatherhead to London Bridge, but did not begin stopping at Ashtead until the following year.

After the death of Mary Howard in 1877, much of the village was offered for sale. Ashtead Common was purchased by Thomas Lucas, who sold it four years later, in 1889, to the banker Pantia Ralli. The rest of the land, much of it farmland, was split into eight separate lots. Since the sale coincided with a period of depression in British agriculture, the land sold cheaply. The lot containing Ashtead Park and Home Farm was withdrawn from sale when it failed to meet its reserve price and was acquired by Pantia Ralli in 1889.

By 1887, the majority of the farms in Ashtead had been broken up and the land was in the hands of eight major owners and many smaller ones. New houses began to be built on the east side of Woodfield Lane and to the north of Barnett Wood Lane. The area west of the station (including Links Road and Ashtead Woods Road) had been marked out for housing by 1894, but construction was delayed by difficulties in securing access over the railway. Elsewhere building work was also slow and the population of the village increased from 906 in 1871 to 1,881 in 1901.

=== 20th century ===
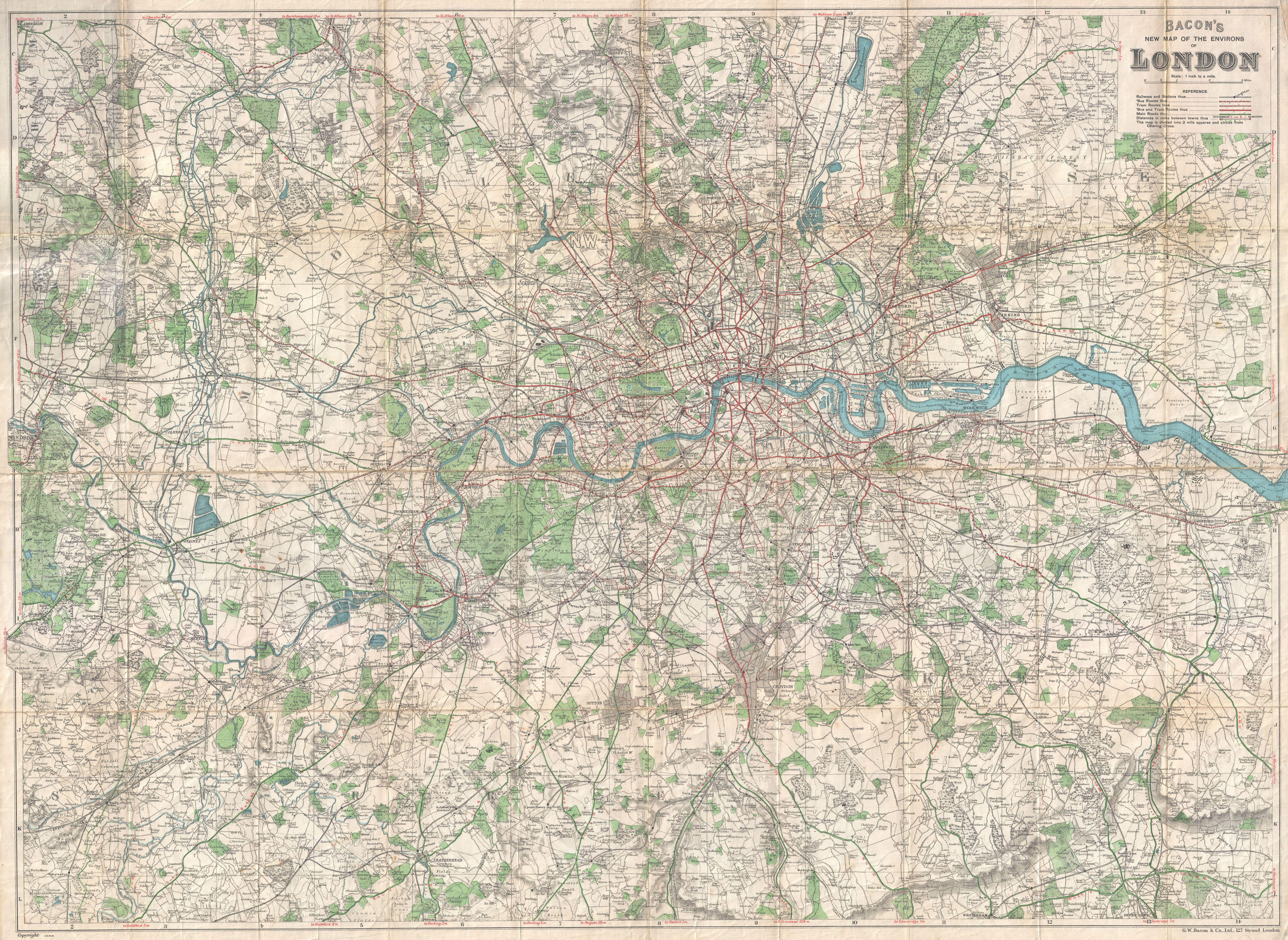
Extract from Bacon Pocket Map of London (1920)

Development continued in the first decade of the 20th century and the population had reached 2,921 by 1911. Many of the new homes were in the west of the parish and housebuilding took place along Skinners Lane, Ottways Lane and Oakfield Road. By 1914, new houses had also appeared along Leatherhead Road, Woodfield Road and The Marld. Many of the new residents were professionals who commuted to London by train.

During the First World War, several hundred men from the 21st Battalion of the Royal Fusiliers were billeted in the village and were responsible for constructing a convalescent hospital at Woodcote Park in Epsom. George V visited the village by train in October 1914 to inspect the troops. By January 1915, there were around 1500 soldiers based in Ashtead. The war memorial at St George's Church was dedicated in 1920.

The inter-war years saw the most rapid period of residential development, stimulated in part by the final breakup of the Ashtead Park estate, following the death of Pantia Ralli in 1924. The electrification of the railway line in 1925 also made the village more attractive to potential homeowners. The population increased from 3,226 in 1921 to 9,336 in 1939.

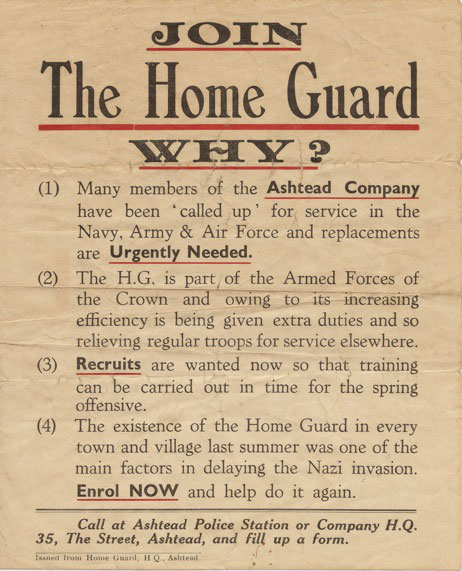
Recruitment poster for the Ashtead Home Guard

In September 1939, children were evacuated to Ashtead from Streatham and Dulwich. A unit of the Royal Norfolk Regiment was stationed in the village at the start of the war and, from 1941, Canadian soldiers were billeted locally. Land bordering Craddocks Avenue was taken over for war allotments and pigs were reared on vacant building plots on the Overdale estate. In 1940 a company of the Home Guard was formed.

In 1940 and 1941, several buildings in Ashtead suffered damage as a result of enemy bombing during the Battle of Britain and the Blitz, including St Andrew's School, which was almost completely destroyed. In the final year of the war, two V-1 flying bombs landed in the village and a V-2 rocket landed to the south of Ashtead Park in February 1945.

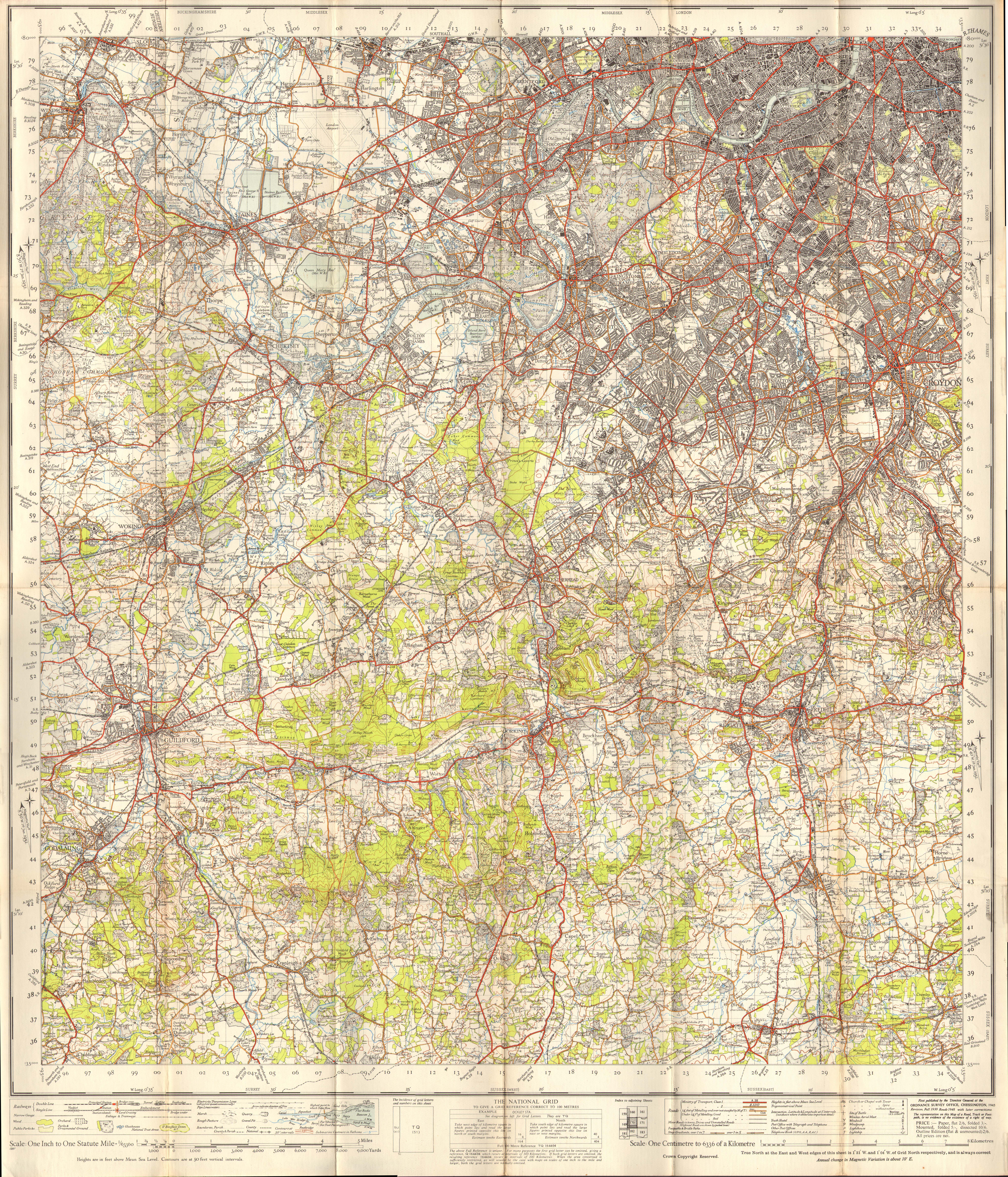
Extract from one-inch scale Ordnance Survey map (1945)

The 1944 Greater London Plan placed much of the land surrounding Ashtead in the protected Metropolitan Green Belt, which severely limited the scope for urban expansion. The northern half of Ashtead Park was threatened with development from the late 1940s and so it was purchased by Surrey County Council in 1957, before being passed to the ownership of the Leatherhead Urban District Council. In 1988, three conservation areas were designated in the village. (Note: The three conservation areas in the village are: a group of ten buildings at the junction of Rectory Lane and Dene Road; an area surrounding the Grade II-listed Ashtead House to the east of the village; a row of 14 Georgian houses on the west side of Woodfield Lane.)

== Government and politics ==
Since 1997, Ashtead has been part of the parliamentary constituency of Epsom and Ewell.

For much of the 19th century, local infrastructure and services were overseen by the vestry, but the Local Government Act 1888 transferred many administrative responsibilities to the newly formed Surrey County Council. A parish council was established under the Local Government Act 1894 when the village became part of Epsom Rural District. The parish council was abolished in 1933, when Ashtead became part of Leatherhead Urban District. Ashtead thus became an urban parish. In 1951 the parish had a population of 9852. On 1 April 1974 the parish was abolished. Mole Valley District Council was created in 1974 by combining the Urban Districts of Dorking and Leatherhead with the Rural District of Dorking.

Although Ashtead does not have a parish council today, stakeholder engagement is conducted through a number of bodies, including Ashtead Residents' Association.

== Demography and housing ==
In the 2011 census, the combined population of the Ashtead Common, Park and Village wards was 14,169.

2011 Census Households
| Ward | Population | Households | % Owned outright | % Owned with a loan | hectares |
|---|---|---|---|---|---|
| Ashtead Common | 4,129 | 1,617 | 41 | 44 | 441 |
| Ashtead Park | 4,042 | 1,654 | 48 | 34 | 520 |
| Ashtead Village | 5,998 | 2,368 | 46 | 36 | 198 |
| Regional average | | | 35.1 | 32.5 | |

2011 Census Homes
| Ward | Detached | Semi-detached | Terraced | Flats and apartments | Caravans/temporary/mobile homes/houseboats | Shared between households |
|---|---|---|---|---|---|---|
| Ashtead Common | 554 | 744 | 70 | 248 | 1 | 0 |
| Ashtead Park | 1,045 | 314 | 82 | 210 | 1 | 2 |
| Ashtead Village | 1,080 | 754 | 217 | 309 | 4 | 4 |

== Public services ==
=== Utilities ===
Until the late 18th century, villagers obtained drinking water from The Rye or from wells. In 1884, the first piped supply was installed by the Leatherhead and District Water Company and was fed from a borehole at Waterway Road in Leatherhead. The gas main from Epsom was installed in the 1880s, to supply gas for street lighting. The first sewerage system was completed in 1900 and electricity reached Ashtead in the same year.

=== Emergency services ===
In the early 19th century a constable was employed by the vestry and the Leg of Mutton and Cauliflower public house doubled as the village prison, where the accused could be held before trial. Policing in the village became the responsibility of the Surrey Constabulary on its creation in 1851.

Ashtead Fire Brigade was founded in 1901. At first the horse-drawn fire cart was housed at the Leg of Mutton and Cauliflower, but it moved to a site in Agates Lane in 1908. The village Brigade was merged with that of Leatherhead in October 1926. In 2021, the fire authority for the village is Surrey County Council and the statutory fire service is Surrey Fire and Rescue Service. Local ambulance services are run by the South East Coast Ambulance Service.

=== Healthcare ===
Ashtead Hospital, a private hospital not run by the NHS, opened in the old chalk quarry site to the south of the village in September 1984. The nearest hospital with an A&E is Epsom Hospital, 2.1 km (1.3 mi) away. As of 2021, the village has two GP practices, both on Woodfield Lane.

== Industry and business ==
Brick and tile manufacture has taken place at Ashtead at several points in the village's history. Clay pits on Ashtead Common were active in the 1st, 2nd, 13th and 14th centuries and, in the mid-19th century, there was a brick kiln and drying shed in Newton Wood. In around 1880, the Sparrow brothers opened a works to the north of Barnett Wood Lane and their company was active for around 30 years. Houses were built on the site in the 1950s and part of the old clay pit is now the Floral Pond, adjacent to The Chase. (Note: After the First World War, Sparrow clay pit was landscaped and became a swimming pool, which closed in 1959.) Ashtead Brickworks, to the west of the Sparrow Works, was established in 1896 and closed in 1909.

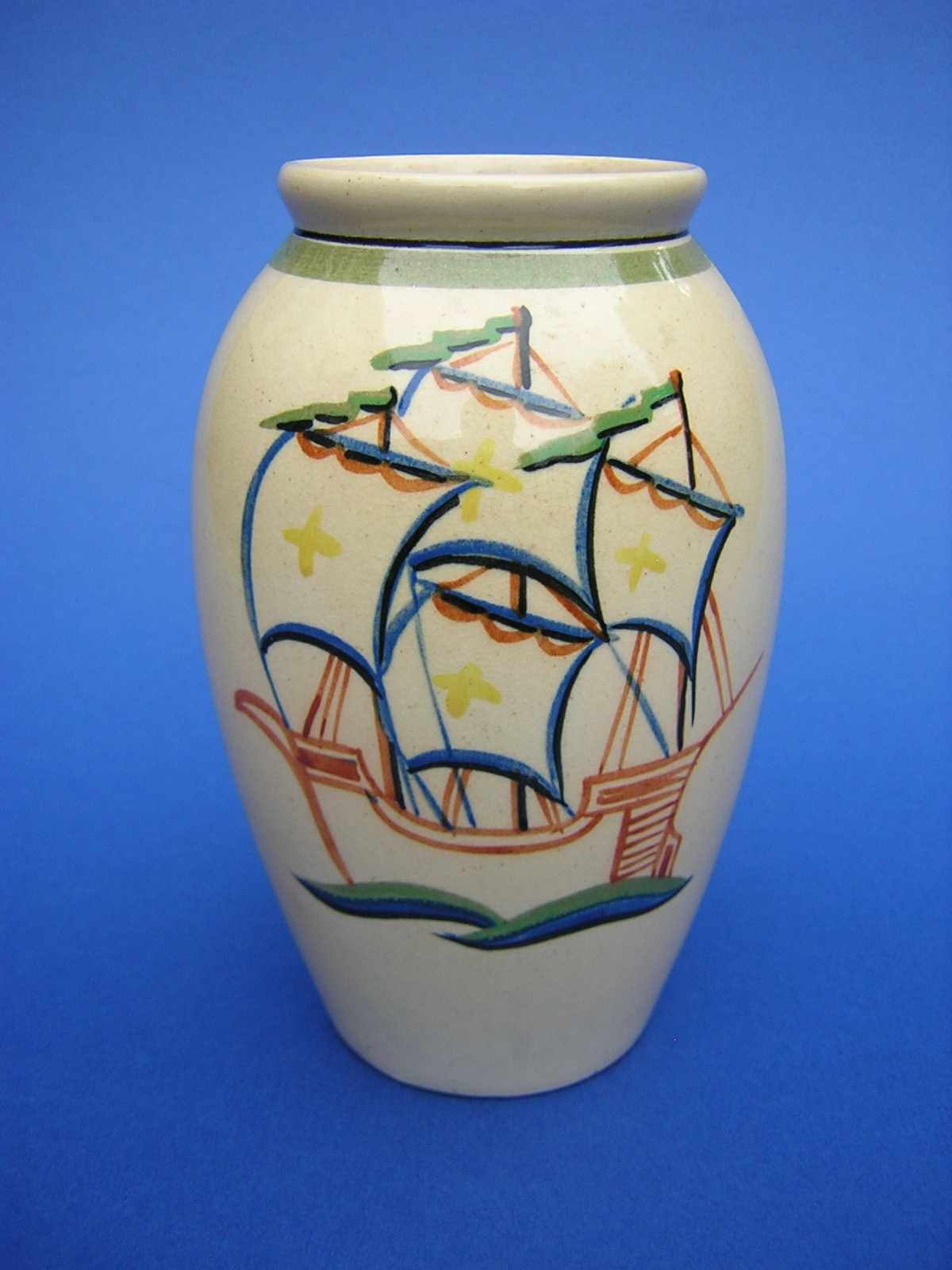
A vase produced by Ashtead Potters Ltd

Ashtead Potters Ltd was established in the village in 1923 by Sir Lawrence Weaver and Kathleen Purcell, Lady Weaver. The firm was based in the Victoria Works in West Hill (Note: Between 1912 and 1915, the Victoria Works was a workshop and sales depot for the Stanley Motor Carriage Company, an American manufacturer of steam cars.) and produced a wide range of products in a variety of styles. The clay was delivered by train to Ashtead station. The company ceased trading in 1935 after sales fell during the Great Depression.

The construction company Longcross had its head office in Ashtead but entered administration in 2015.

The Ashtead Group was founded in 1947 as Ashtead Plant and Tool Hire. It was first listed on the London Stock Exchange in 1986. The company operates internationally and serves customers in Canada, the United States and the United Kingdom.

== Transport ==
=== Road ===
The A24 single-carriageway road runs through the centre of the village. In October 1985, Ashtead was joined to the UK motorway system, when the M25 motorway was opened between Wisley and Reigate.

=== Bus ===
Route 408 (Epsom – Leatherhead – Cobham) and Route 479 (Epsom – Leatherhead – Guildford) are both operated by Falcon Buses. Route 32 (Crawley - Charlwood - Dorking - Leatherhead - Epsom) is operated by Metrobus.

=== Railway ===
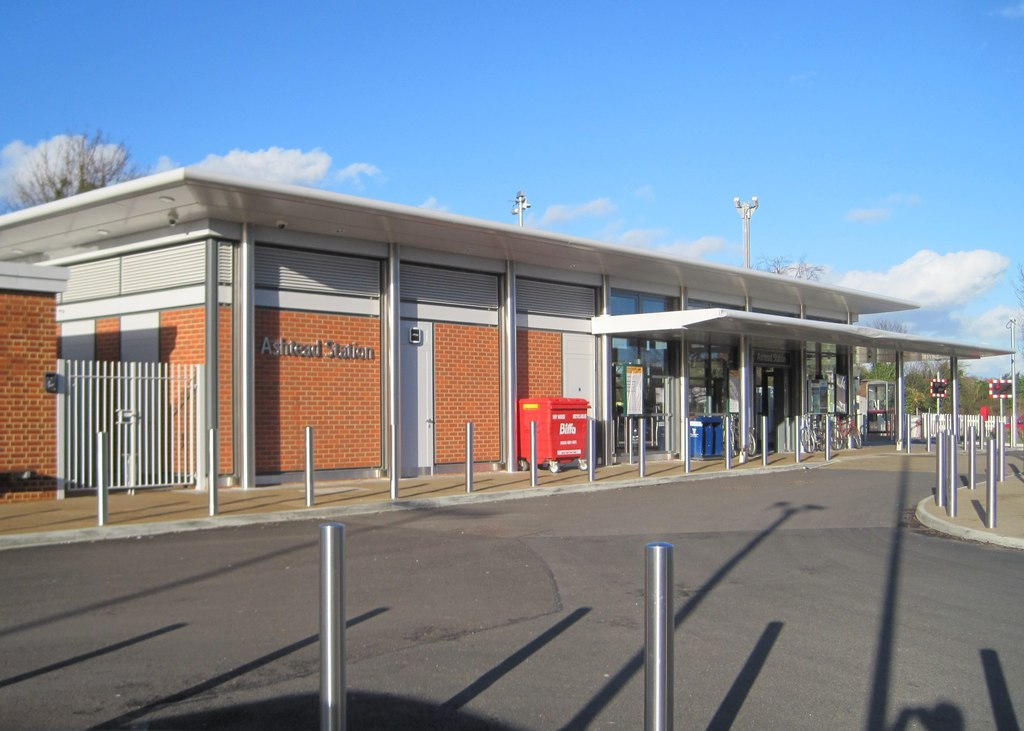
Ashtead railway station

Ashtead railway station is to the northwest of the village centre and is managed by Southern. The main ticket office building was rebuilt in 2013. It is served by trains to London Victoria via Sutton, to London Waterloo via Wimbledon, to Horsham via Dorking and Guildford via Bookham.

=== Long-distance footpath ===
The Thames Down Link long-distance footpath between Kingston upon Thames and Box Hill runs through Ashtead Park.

== Schools ==
=== Maintained schools ===
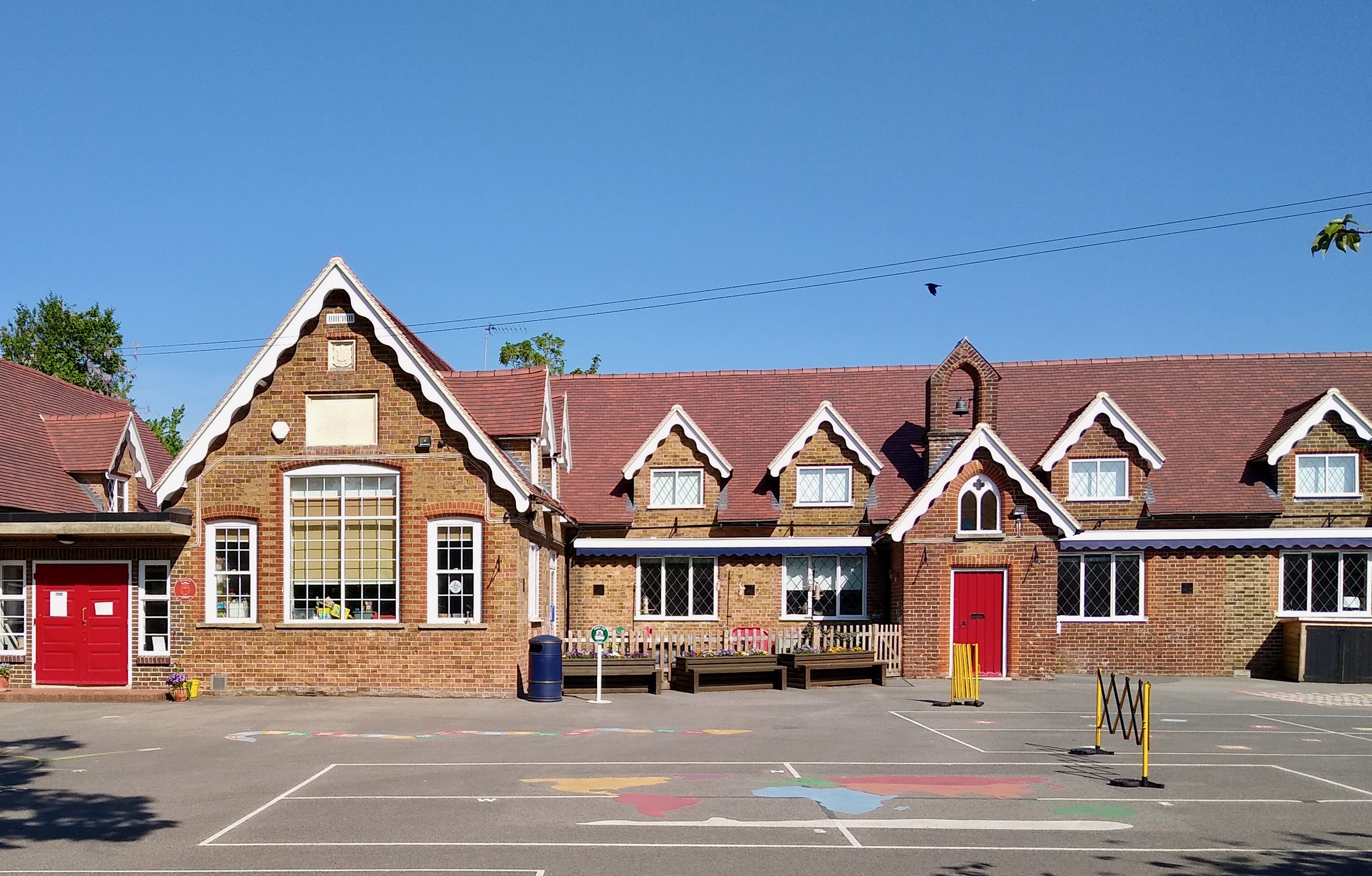
St Giles' School, Ashtead

The first school in Ashtead was established by the Howard family in 1815 and was located close to the almshouses in Park Lane. On opening it catered for around 60 children, but numbers had grown to around 100 by 1850. St Giles' Infant School was established in 1852 by Mary Howard to replace the Park Lane school. Originally boys and girls were taught separately, but the two halves were amalgamated in 1900. By 1904 there were 317 children enrolled.

Barnett Wood Infant School was opened as Ashtead Council School in 1906. Initially it was housed in temporary facilities, but moved to its present brick building in 1914. The Greville Primary School was opened in 1958 and is thought to have been named after Fulk Greville Howard, husband of Mary Howard. West Ashtead Primary School was opened in 1964 and underwent an expansion in the mid-1970s.

St Andrew's Catholic Secondary School is in Leatherhead, close to the southern boundary of the village.

=== Independent schools ===
The City of London Freemen's School was founded in 1854 by the Corporation of London to educate orphans of the freemen of the city. Originally located in Brixton, the school taught both boys and girls from the outset and it is one of the oldest coeducational establishments in the world. In 1926, the school moved to its present site in Ashtead Park and began to admit fee-paying pupils.

Downsend Lodge (Ashtead) was founded as Ryebrook School in 1948. It was acquired by Downsend School in 1983 and is run as a pre-prep feeder school. The main Downsend School site is in Leatherhead, close to the border with Ashtead.

=== Former schools ===
Parsons Mead School was an independent school founded by Jessie Elliston in 1897. In 1904 it moved to its permanent site in Ottways Lane and by the outbreak of the First World War it had 95 female pupils, aged between 10 and 18. A decline in school numbers forced the school to close in 2006 and the site was sold for housing a year later.

== Places of worship ==
=== St Giles' Church ===
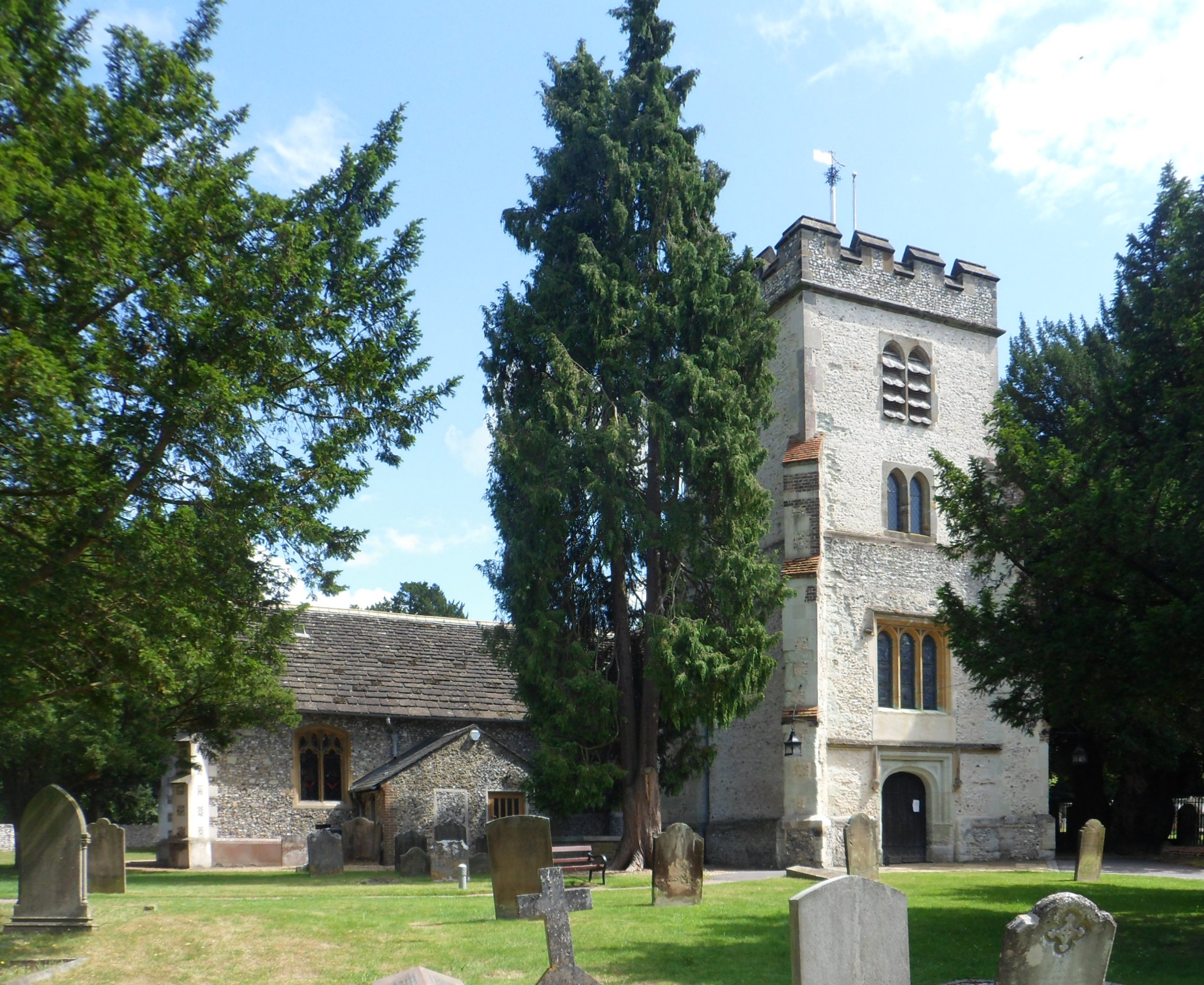
St Giles' Church

St Giles' Church is first recorded in a charter of the Bishop of Winchester that dates from the early 12th century. It was built around 1115 with an endowment from Laurence of Rouen, probably as a private chapel for the nearby manor house. The oldest surviving part is the east end of the nave, the south wall of which includes some Roman tiles.

The chancel was added in the 13th century and St Giles' became a church in its own right, with a rector and vicar. A substantial rebuilding took place in the 15th and 16th centuries, during which the tower was added. The east window, which is attributed to the 16th-century artist Lambert Lombard of Liège was transferred from Herkenrode Abbey, Belgium, in 1818. Charles Bagot, ambassador at The Hague, procured the glass from the owner of the dissolved abbey and presented it to the church in honour of his relative, Mary Howard. The stone reredos and panelled-cedar chancel ceiling date from the same period. The ring of six bells dating from 1725, was recast as a peal of eight in 1873.

A major redevelopment took place in the 1890s, which included the renewal of the roof, pews and pulpit. A new organ chamber was built at the same time and new arches were opened in the walls of the chancel and north aisle. The lychgate was erected in 1903 in memory of Sir Thomas Lucas. The churchyard contains 16 Commonwealth war graves of service personnel of both World Wars.

=== St George's Church ===
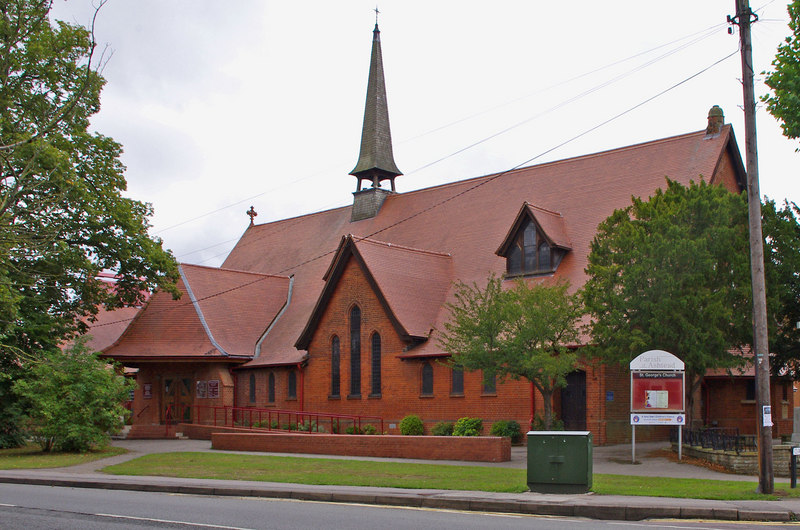
St George's Church

A small church built of corrugated iron was built in Lower Ashtead in 1882, funded by a donation from Sir Thomas Lucas. The foundation stone for the permanent replacement was laid in 1905 and St George's Church was consecrated in April of the following year. The brick building was designed by Arthur Conran Blomfield (Note: Arthur Conran Blomfield (1863-1935) was the son of Sir Arthur William Blomfield.) and, on opening, consisted of a nave, chancel, north aisle and transept. An organ chamber and vestry were added in 1908 and the church hall was constructed in 1954. A new east window, designed by Christopher Webb, was installed in 1961 and the south aisle was built three years later.

A major redevelopment took place in the late 1990s, during which the old hall was demolished and a two-storey extension to the church was constructed. The church was reopened in 2001.

=== St Michael's Catholic Church ===
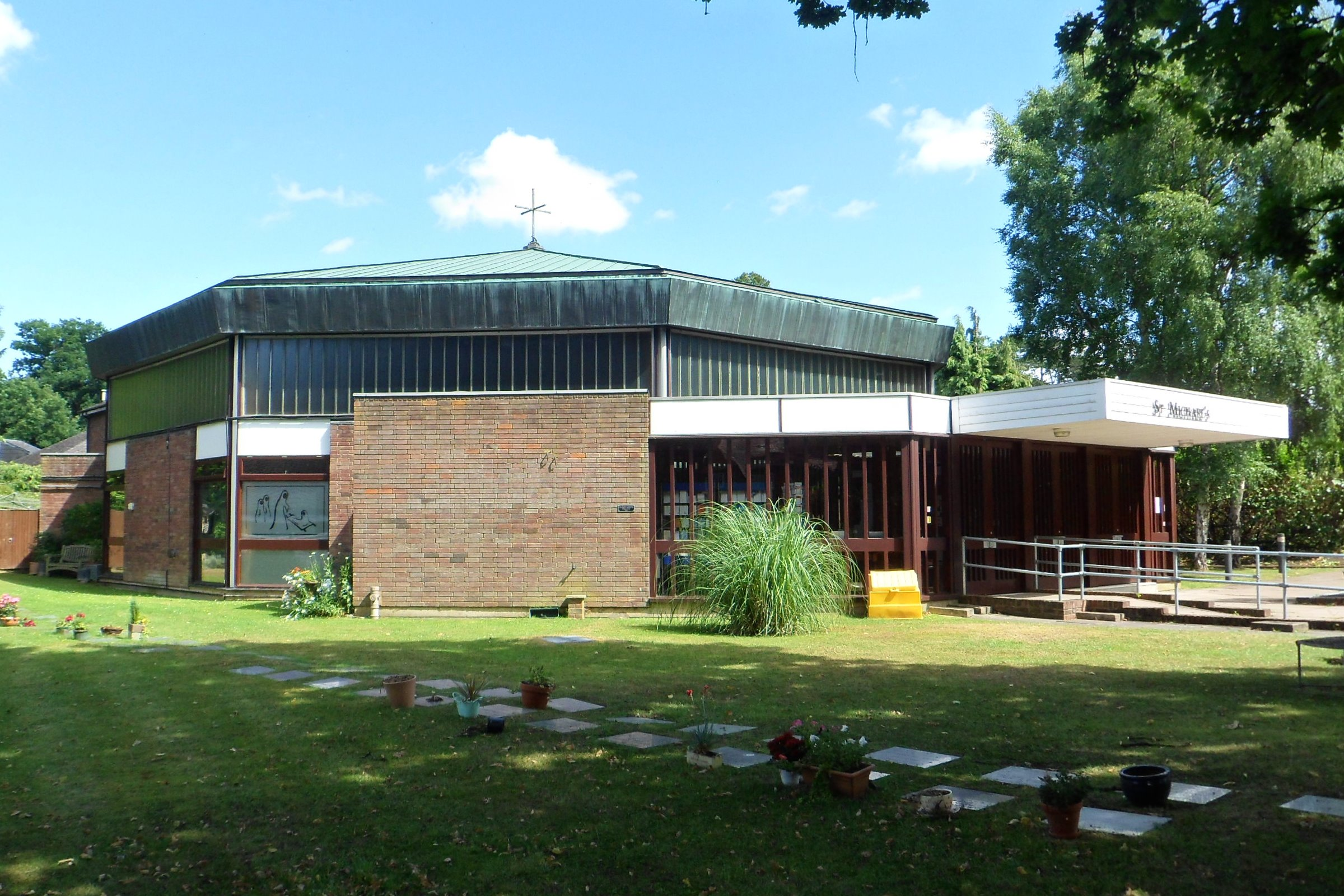
St Michael's Catholic Church

The first regular Catholic masses to be held in Ashtead since Elizabethan times took place in the Constitutional Hall in Barnett Wood Lane in 1942. Two years later a bombed-out house in Woodfield Lane was purchased and the congregation began meeting in the corrugated iron garage on the site, replaced in 1947 by a wooden building.

The foundation stone of St Michael's Catholic Church was laid on 1 July 1967 and construction work was completed in October of the same year. The architect was Eduardo Dodds and the altar and font were designed by Joseph Cribb. The church hall was opened in 1983.

=== Ashtead Baptist Church ===
The Baptist Church has its origins in the Ashtead Gospel Church, which was a temporary building, constructed of corrugated iron in 1895. It became the Ashtead Free Church in 1913 and was replaced by a permanent brick building in 1924.

== Culture ==
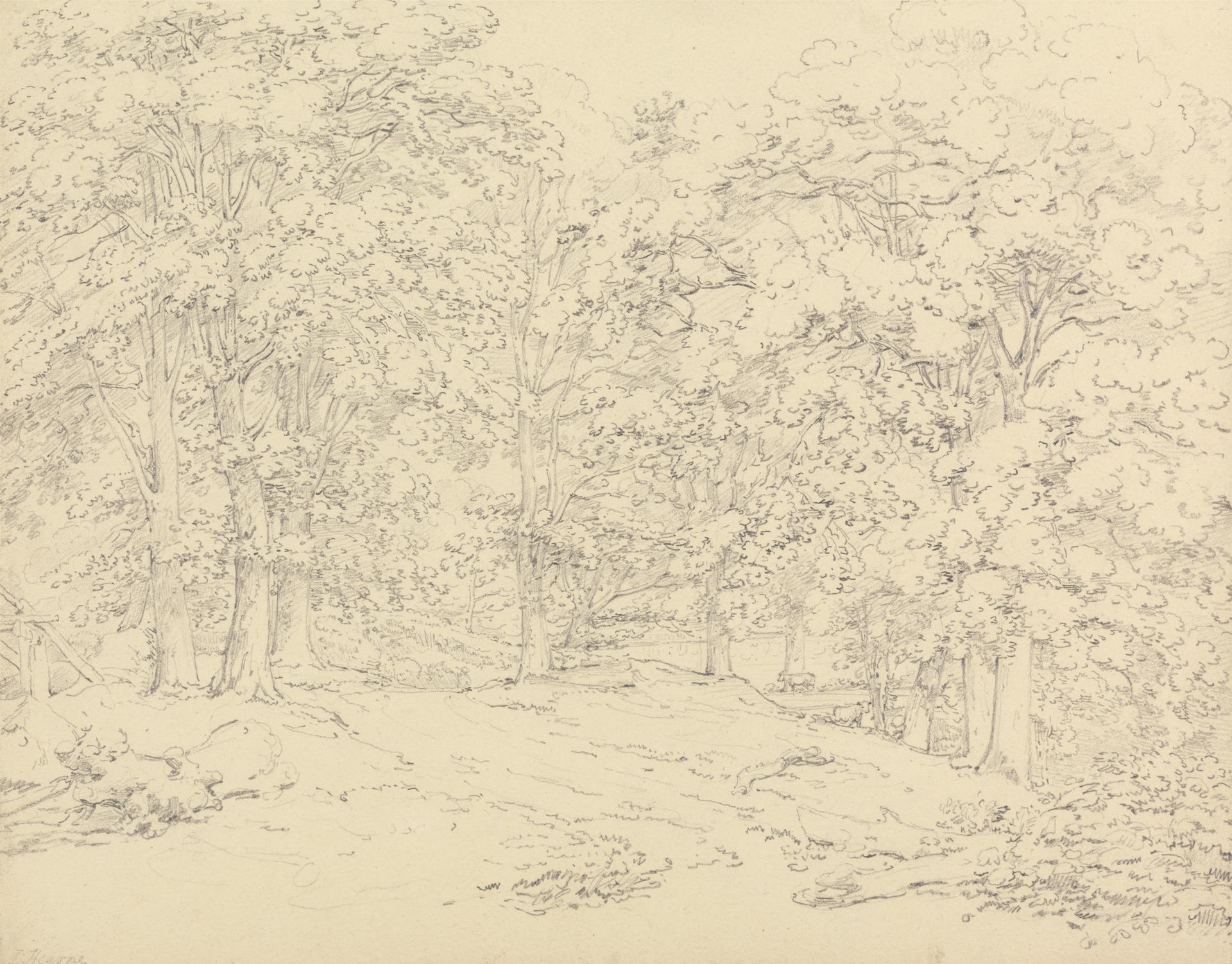
Trees in Ashtead Park, Surrey (undated) by Thomas Hearne (1744–1817)

Ashtead Choral Society was founded in 1949 and performs regularly in local venues, including the Dorking Halls. In 2008, the society commissioned The Ashtead Psalms by Robert Steadman to mark its 50th anniversary.

== Sport ==
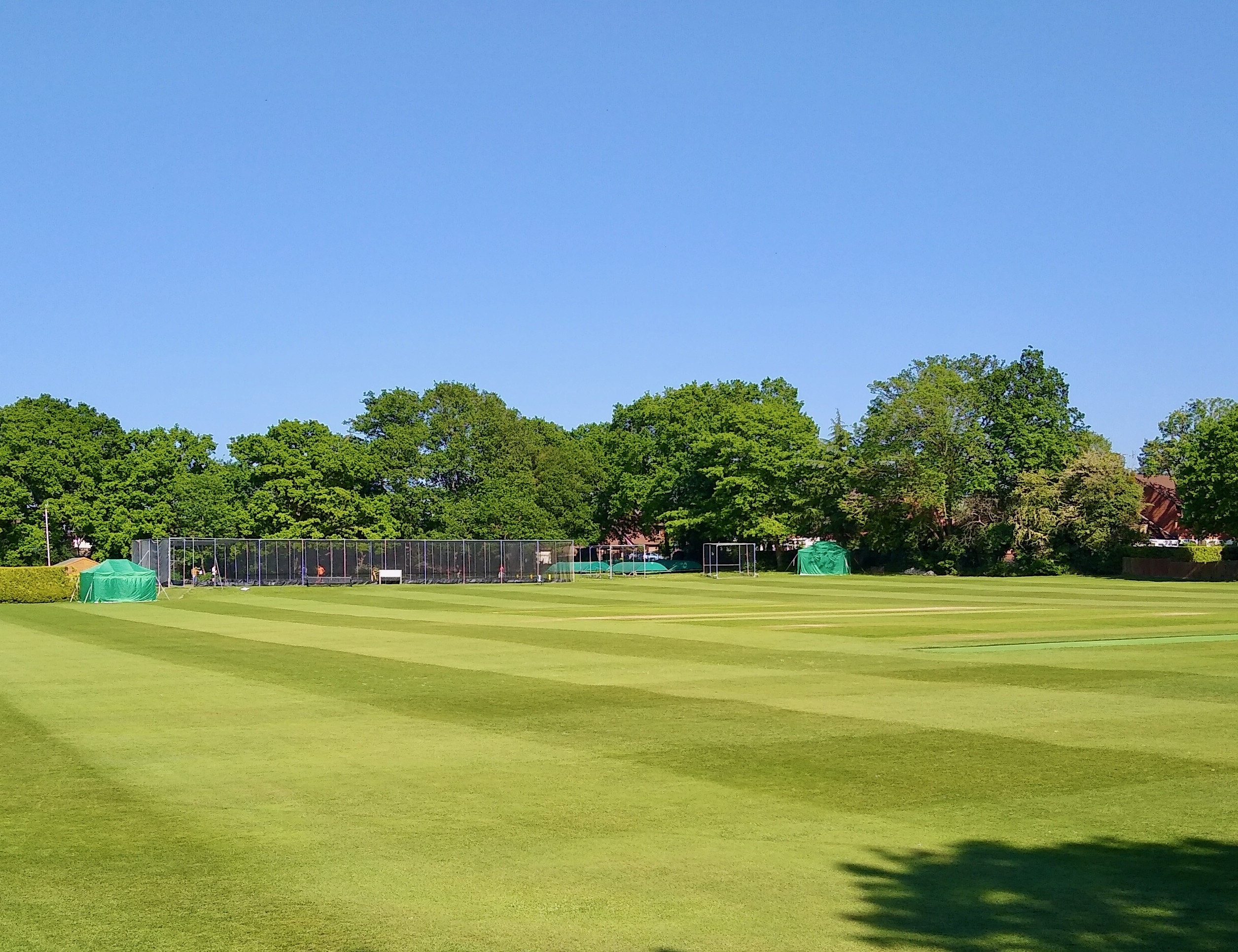
Ashtead cricket ground, Woodfield Lane

Ashtead Cricket Club was founded in 1887. The home ground is at Woodfield Lane and in 2020 the club played in the Premier league of the Surrey Championship. The Old Freemen's Cricket Club also plays cricket in Ashtead. Its home fixtures are split between the grounds of the City of London Freemen's School in Ashtead Park and at Headley Cricket Club to work around term time use by the School.

Ashtead Football Club was founded in 1894. Initially it played its home games at Woodfield Lane, but since the Second World War it has used the Recreation Ground.

The Old Freemen's Ladies' hockey team play on the artificial pitch in Ashtead Park every Saturday, with training in Clapham. Rugby Union has been played in Ashtead Park since 1930 as the home of the Old Freemen's RFC.

== Parks and open spaces ==
=== Ashtead Common ===
In medieval times, Ashtead Common was the waste land of the manor. It was used extensively for grazing of livestock, trees were harvested for timber and many of the older oaks show signs of pollarding. (Note: There are more than 2,300 oak trees on Ashtead Common, many of which are thought to be between 200 and 300 years old.) Following the end of the Second World War, the Common was designated a Site of Special Scientific Interest and was protected as part of the Metropolitan Greenbelt. It was purchased by Mole Valley District Council (MVDC) in 1988 and was passed to the Corporation of London in 1991. Today the total area of the Common is approximately 200 ha (490 acres) and access is provided by public footpaths and bridleways. It provides a habitat for 90 different bird species, including tawny owls and green woodpeckers, as well as 130 rare species of beetle.

=== Ashtead Park ===
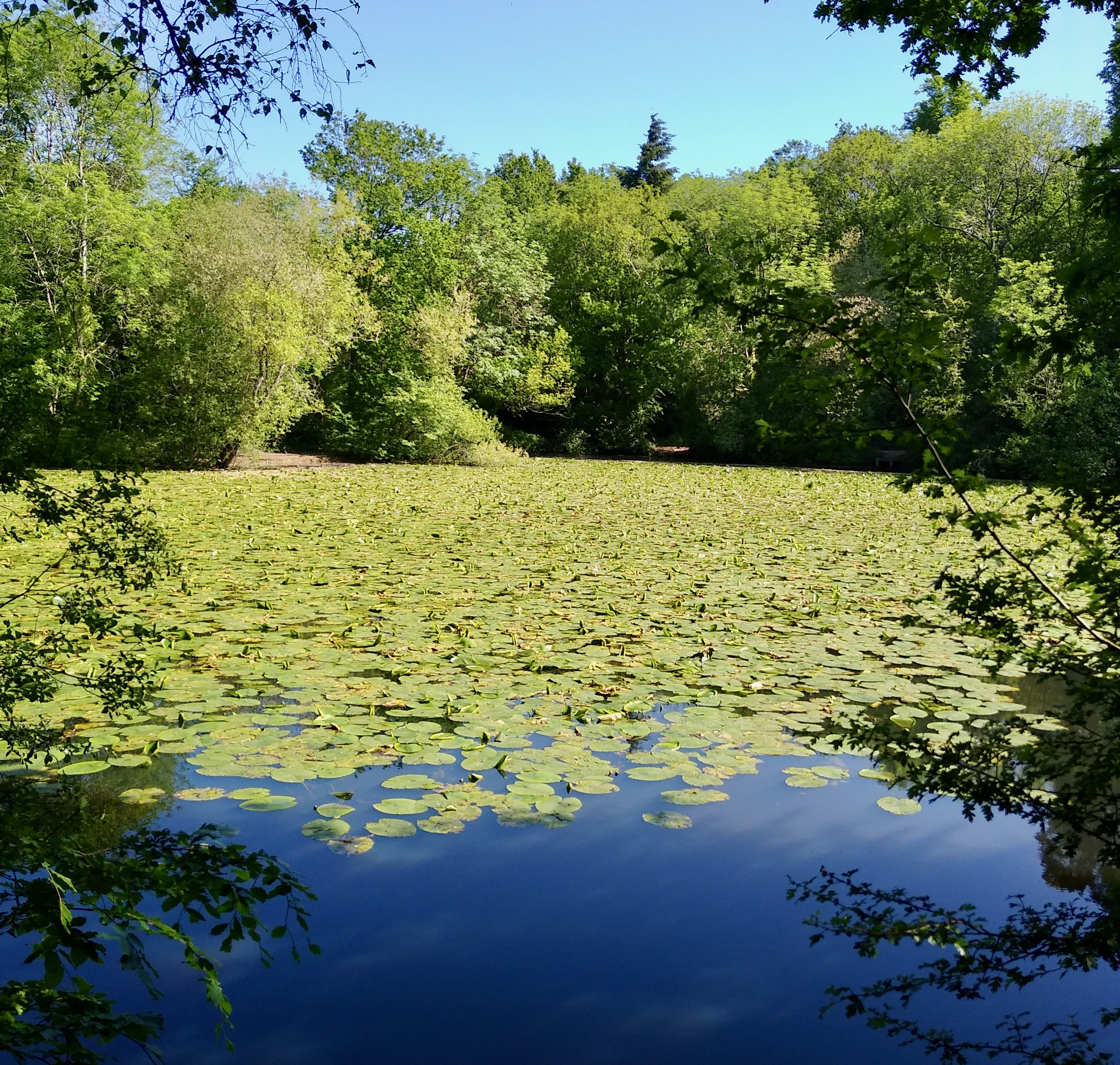
Upper Pond, Ashtead Park

Ashtead Park was conceived as a 200-acre deer park, by Sir Robert Howard, who became Lord of the Manor in 1680. Following the death of Pantia Ralli in 1924, the southern half was bought by the Corporation of London. The northern part, which includes oak woodland and two large ponds has been designated a local nature reserve and is managed by Surrey Wildlife Trust on behalf of MVDC.

=== Ashtead Rye Meadows ===
The privately owned Ashtead Rye Meadows, to the west of the village, was designated a Site of Nature Conservation Interest in 2013. The 19 ha (48-acre) site runs along the banks of The Rye, downstream of Ashtead Common. In the early Middle Ages, part of the area was known as "The Great Marsh" and the court roll of 1483 records its clearance and conversion into pasture. The system of drainage was also installed around this time and the oldest hedges date from at least 1638. The course of The Rye through the meadows was straightened during the 1950s when the adjacent housing was constructed, leading to a loss of wildlife habitats. Volunteers restored the stream in the 2010s, reinstating the original meanders. In 2017, one area of the meadows was designated a "Centenary Field" to commemorate the 62 residents of Ashtead who died in the First World War.

=== Recreation Ground ===
The Recreation Ground in Barnett Wood Lane was opened in 1932.

== Notable buildings and landmarks ==
=== Ashtead Park House ===
Ashtead Park House was designed by Joseph Bonomi the Elder in the classical style and was completed in 1790. It is constructed from yellow stock bricks with Portland stone dressings. It was enlarged and altered in around 1880 for Sir Thomas Lucas. Notable features include the c. 1790 circular saloon, which has scagliola columns and a plaster frieze. The interiors of the Jacobean-style entrance hall and other principal rooms date from the late 19th century. The main staircase features an Adam-style bronze balustrade. The building is now Grade II* listed and is part of the City of London Freemen's School.

=== Coal-tax posts ===
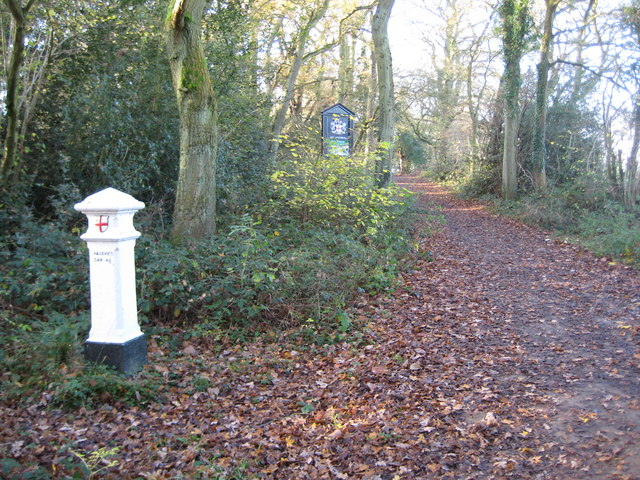
'Type 2' coal-tax post on Ashtead Common

Six surviving coal-tax posts are positioned at intervals along the northern boundaries of Ashtead. These posts marked the limits of the tax jurisdiction of the Corporation of London and were erected under the provisions of the London Coal and Wine Duties Continuance Act 1861. The majority of the posts are classified as 'Type 2' and are made of cast iron, painted white. The post adjacent to the railway line is a taller 'Type 4' design, made of unpainted stone.

=== Feilding House ===
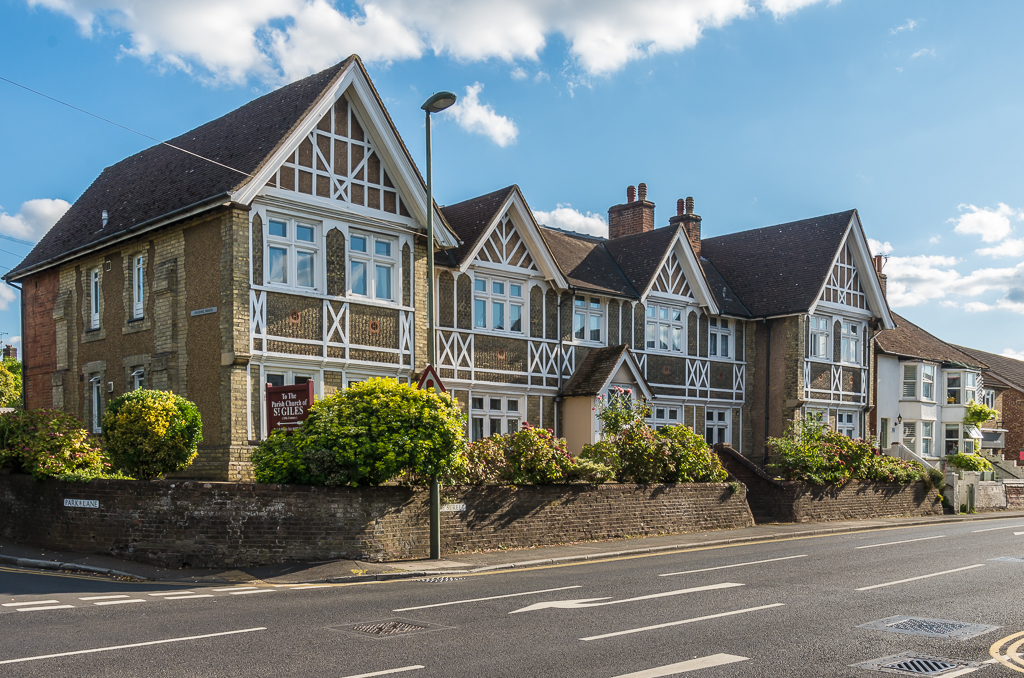
Feilding House

The almshouses in The Street were established following a bequest from Lady Diana Howard, who lived at Ashtead Park until her death in 1733. They are thought to take their name from that of her second husband, the Whig politician, William Feilding. Originally the building accommodated six widows, but in 1852, alterations were carried out to increase the number of residents to eight.

=== Grey Wings ===
Grey Wings is a detached house that was designed by the architects Giles Gilbert Scott and his brother Adrian. It was built in 1913 and has been Grade II listed on the National Heritage List for England since January 1999. It was occupied by the Boustead family shortly after completion. It has been subject to very few alterations since its construction.

Grey Wings was put up for sale for £2.1 million in September 2015. It was listed as having 4 reception rooms and 6 bedrooms.

=== Leg of Mutton and Cauliflower pub ===
The oldest parts of the Leg of Mutton and Cauliflower pub date from the late 17th century and an innkeeper is first recorded as working there in 1707. The building has a timber-framed core, but the frontage was extended in the early 20th century. It is protected by a Grade II listing.

=== Memorial fountain ===
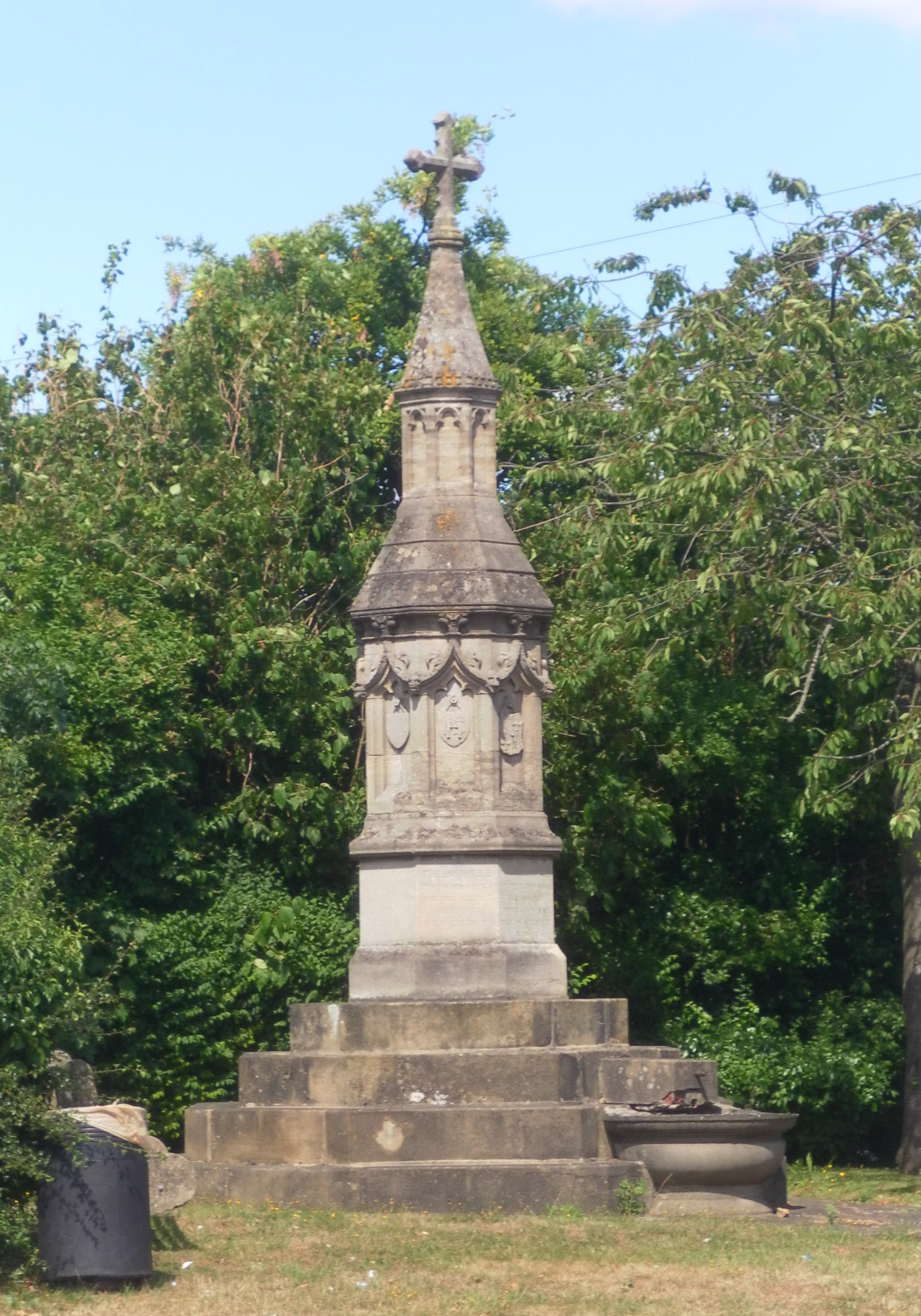
The Howard Memorial Fountain

The Memorial Fountain was erected by the parishioners of Ashtead in 1879 in memory of Mary Howard. It is built from sandstone ashlar in the form of a medieval cross.

=== Peace Memorial Hall ===
The Peace Memorial Hall in Woodfield Lane was built to celebrate the end of the First World War. The single-storey building was opened in 1924 by Sir Rowland Blades and functions as a village hall.

=== Public Library ===
The library in Woodfield Lane is run by Surrey County Council. The brick building was designed by the county architect RJ Ash and was opened in 1968.

=== Village Club ===
Ashtead Village Club was founded in 1887 as a church social club for men of the parish, to provide an alternative source of entertainment to the local pubs. The club moved to its present site in 1888, but the premises were bombed in 1941 and a partial rebuilding took place in the early 1950s. The current two-storey building was opened in 1966. Women were allowed to become full members of the club in 2008.

=== Whittaker's Cottages ===
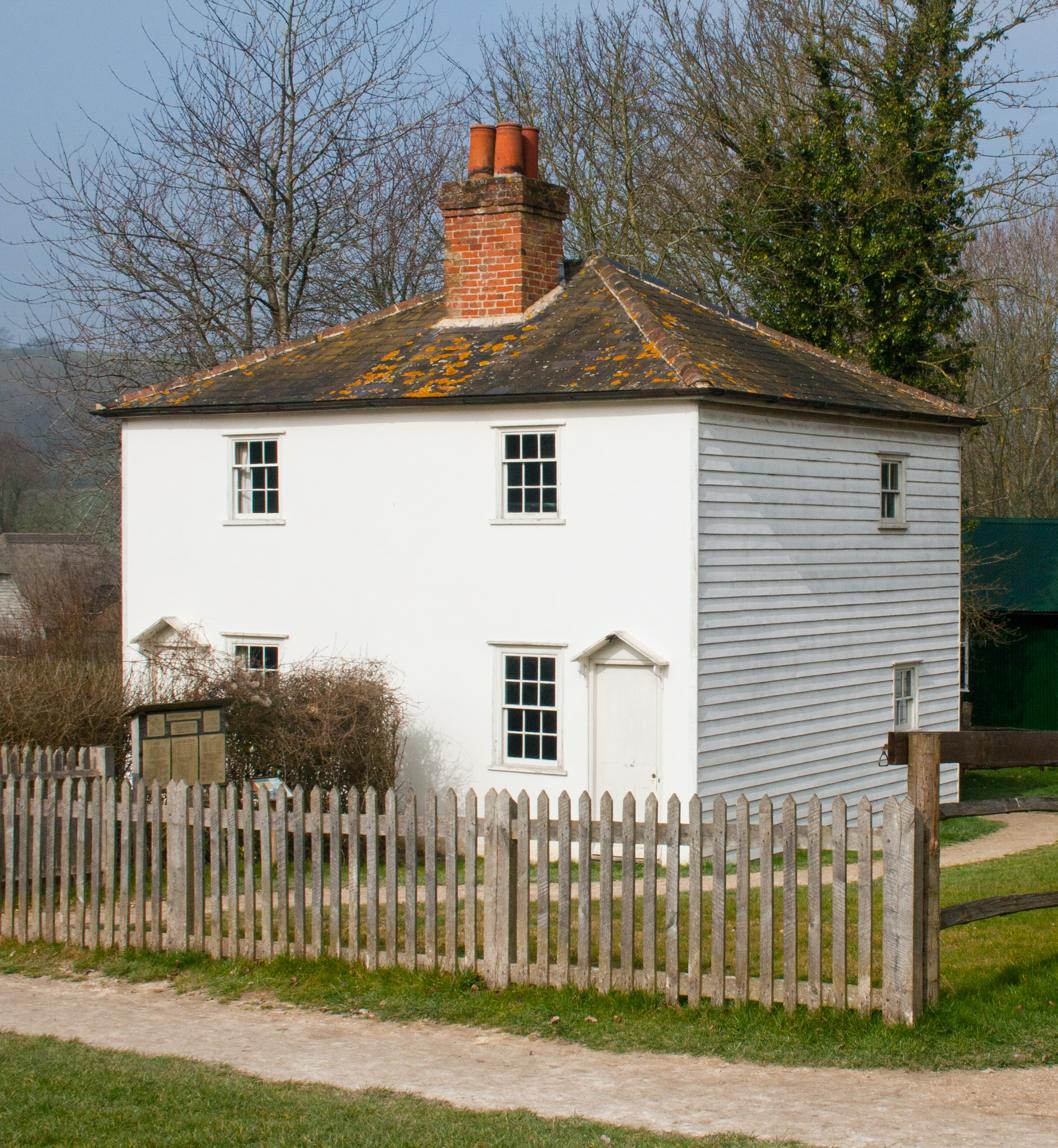
Whittaker's Cottages at the Weald and Downland Living Museum

Whittaker's Cottages were constructed adjacent to the railway line in the mid-1860s and are named after a farm labourer who had owned the land before they were built. Each two-storey, semi-detached cottage measures 12 ft (3.7 m) wide and 20 ft (6.1 m) deep. Although the shared chimney and foundations are made from brick, the cottages are built primarily of timber. Imported softwood from the Baltic was used for the walls, floors, roof and cladding and hardwood was used for the infill framing. The cottages were dismantled in 1987 and were relocated to the Weald and Downland Living Museum in West Sussex.

== Notable residents ==
- Edward Aston (d. 1568) was Sheriff of Staffordshire and owned the Manor of Ashtead from 1526 to 1543
- Edward Darcy (d. 1612) was a politician and courtier and owned the Manor of Ashtead from 1589 until his death
- Samuel Pepys (1633–1703) visited Ashtead in the 17th century and spent some time living there as a boy
- Thomas Tyers (1726–1787) author
- Thomas Byam Martin (1773–1854) Royal Navy officer and politician
- Sara Jeannette Duncan (1861–1922) Canadian author and journalist, who wrote under the pen name Mrs Everard Cotes
- Robert Kahn (1865–1951) composer, lived in Ashtead from 1938 until his death
- Robert Davis (1870–1965) inventor of the Submerged Escape Apparatus used by submarine crews in the Second World War.
- Elsie Knocker later Baroness de T'Serclaes, MM, OStJ (1884–1978) nurse and ambulance driver on the Western Front during World War I
- Albert Marshall (1897–2005) the last surviving British cavalryman to have fought on the Western Front during World War I.
- Beverley Nichols (1898–1957) writer and composer
- A. P. Herbert (1890–1971) writer and politician
- Kathleen Riddick (1907–1973) pioneering conductor and founder of the Surrey Philharmonic Orchestra
- Pete Brown (1940–2023) performance poet, lyricist and singer, best known for his collaborations with Cream and Jack Bruce
- Evan Davis (b. 1962) journalist and television presenter, grew up in Ashtead.
- Chris Grayling (b. 1962), member of House of Lords and former MP; long-term resident at Park Lane, Ashtead.

== See also ==
- List of places of worship in Mole Valley

== Bibliography ==
- Bartlett, Robert (2020). Policing Rural Surrey: From the Distant Past to the First World War. Robert Bartlett. Archived from the original on 15 May 2021.
- Cary, John (1790). Survey of the High Roads from London (PDF). London: J. Cary. OCLC 65343822.
- Davies, Gerald (1881). Surrey Local Names. Godalming: R.B. Steadman.
- Evelyn, John (1879). Bray, William (ed.). Diary of John Evelyn. London: Frederick Warne & Co.
- Fiennes, Celia (1888). Through England on a Side Saddle in the Time of William and Mary. London: Leadenhall Press.
- Gover, J.E.B; Mawer, A.; Stenton, F.M. (1934). The Place-names of Surrey. Cambridge: Cambridge University Press.
- Latham, Robert; Matthews, William, eds. (1971). The Diary of Samuel Pepys. Vol. 4. London: Harper Collins. doi:10.1093/actrade/9780004990248.book.1. ISBN 978-0-00-499024-8.
- Jackson, Alan A., ed. (1977). Ashtead, a village transformed: A history of Ashtead from the earliest times to the present day. Leatherhead: Leatherhead & District Local History Society. ISBN 978-0-95-060090-1.
- Joynson, Vernon (2006). The Tapestry of Delights Revisited (1st ed.). Telford: Borderline productions. ISBN 1-899855-15-7.
- Malden, H.E., ed. (1911). A History of the County of Surrey. Vol. 3. London: Victoria County History. Archived from the original on 30 October 2013.
- Stuttard, J.C., ed. (1995). A History of Ashtead. Leatherhead: Leatherhead & District Local History Society. ISBN 978-0-95-060092-5.
- Vardey, Edwina, ed. (1988). History of Leatherhead: a town at the crossroads. Leatherhead: Leatherhead & District Local History Society. ISBN 978-0-95-060091-8.
