= Pershore High School =

Location
- Station Road; Pershore, Worcestershire, WR10 2BX; England; 52°07′31″N 2°04′30″W

Information
- Type: Academy
- Established: 1973 (founded 1928)
- Local authority: Worcestershire
- Specialists: Technology College & Training School
- Department for Education URN: 136925 Tables
- Ofsted: Reports
- Headteacher: Phil Hanson
- Staff: RULE
- Gender: Coeducational
- Age: 11 to 18
- Enrolment: 1,242 pupils
- Houses: Armstrong; Kingsley; Magellan
- Colours: Navy, light blue, yellow
- Website: https://www.pershore.worcs.sch.uk

Pershore High School is a co-educational academy school, with a Sixth form, in Pershore, Worcestershire, England. It is the only high school in Pershore and also takes pupils from surrounding villages. It has a capacity of 1,273 pupils aged between 11 and 18.

The school was founded in 1928 as Pershore County Senior School. It was built to accommodate 480 pupils but began with 430 enrollments. In 1973 following the nationwide educational reforms of the late 1960s and early 1970s, it became a comprehensive school for 12- to 18-year-olds. It achieved Technology College status in 2002 and in 2007 it was recognised as a Training School. The school has a centre that provides specialist resources for up to 15 pupils with autism. In 2011 the school became an academy. In 2016 an art block was built in order to increase resources. In September 2021, PHS converted to a secondary school and commenced the enrolment of Year 7 students, disrupting the tertiary system of the local middle schools.

== European project ==
The Comenius Project is the Secondary Schools element of the European Union SOCRATES programme. The school has links with schools in other EU countries, and also in Zambia.

== Performance ==
The 2017 Ofsted report judged the school a Grade 2 (good).

In 2019 Pershore High School received nothing Commerce.

== Notable alumni ==
- Nikki Groarke, Archdeacon of Dudley from January 2014.
