= Rhyl Lifeboat Station =

RNLI lifeboat station in Denbighshire, Wales

- Gorsaf Bad Achub Y Rhyl

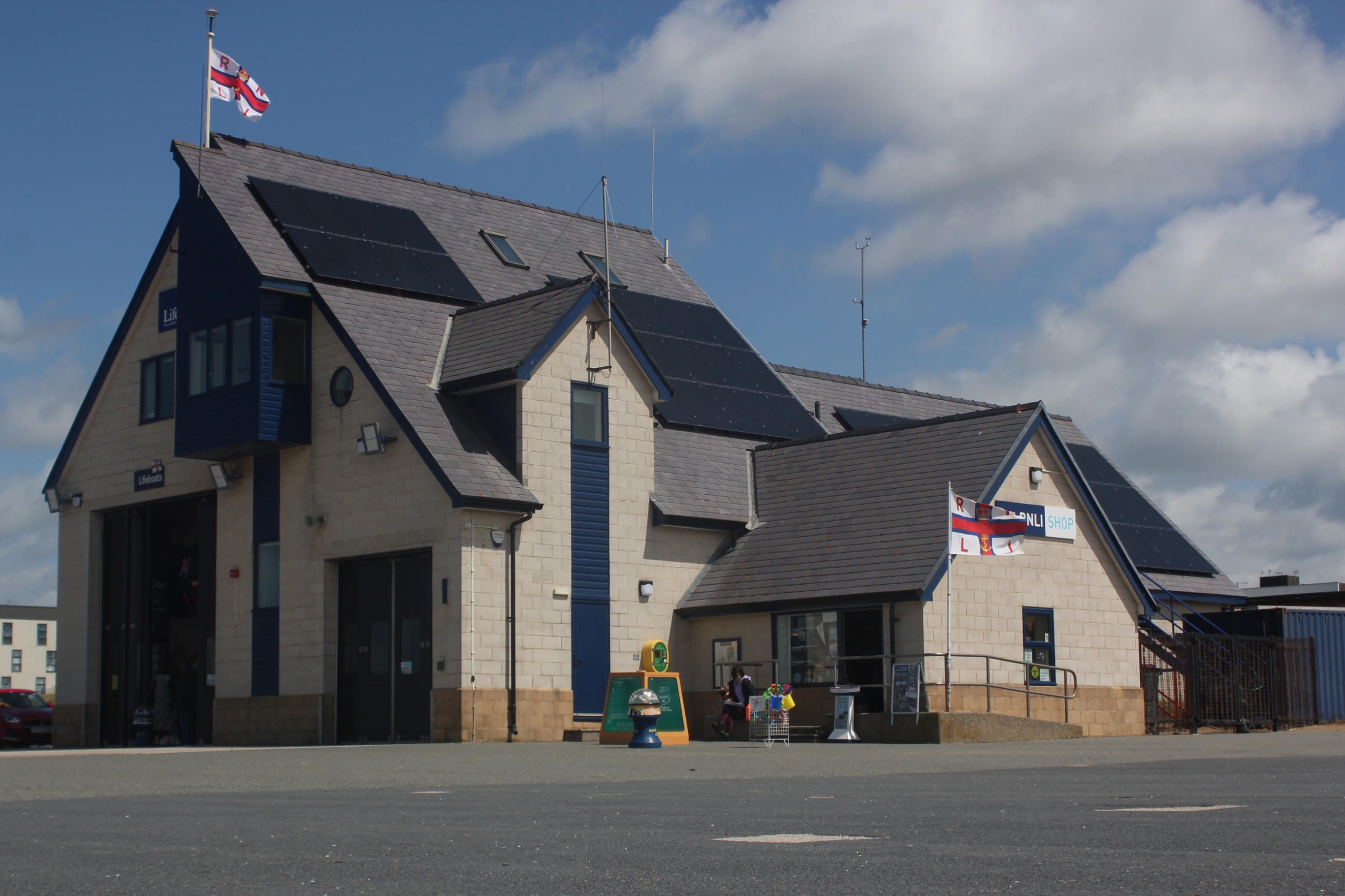
- Rhyl Lifeboat Station in 2024

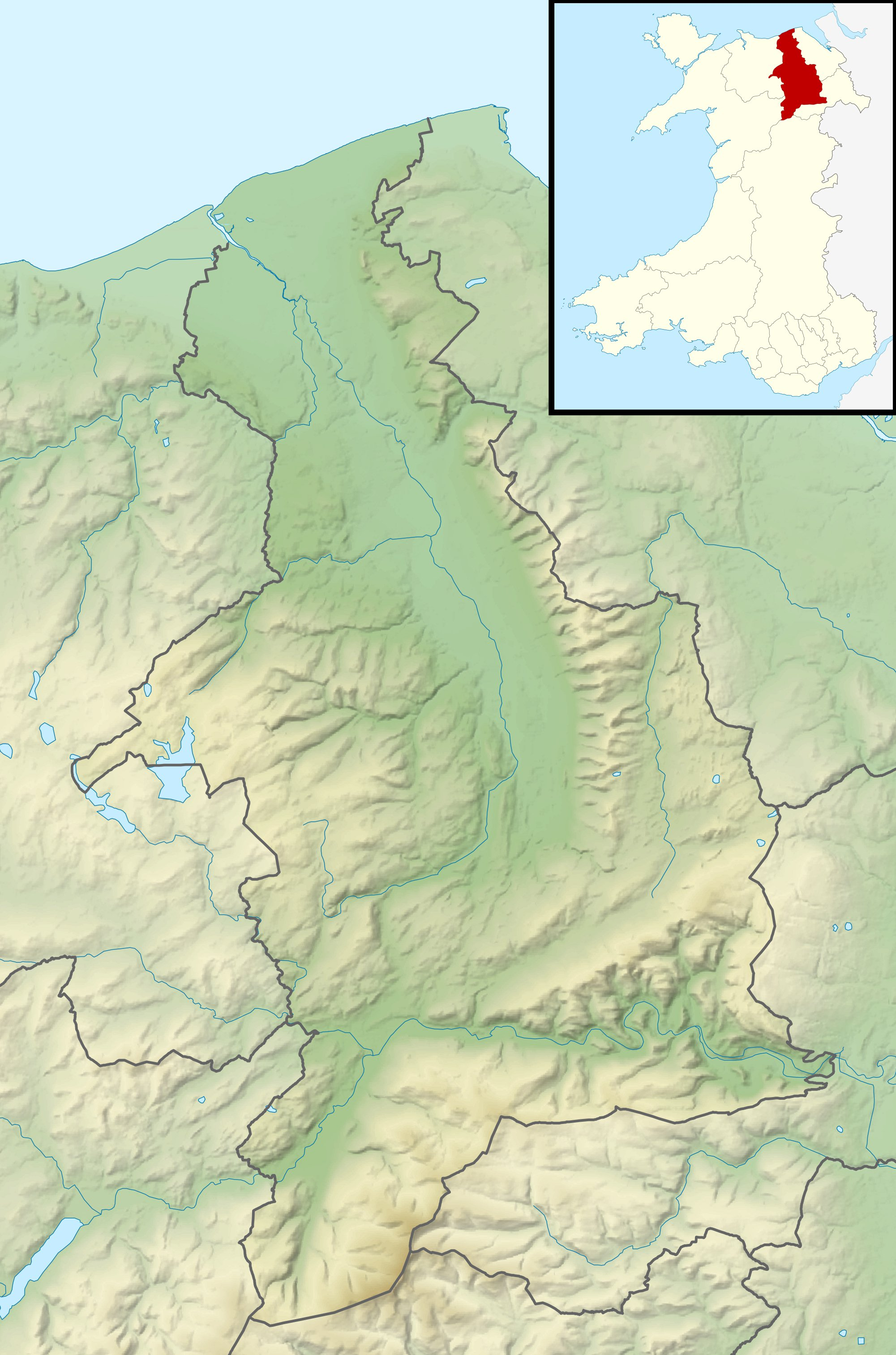
- Location within Denbighshire

General information
- Type: RNLI lifeboat station
- Location: East Parade,, Rhyl, Denbighshire, LL18 3YP, Wales
- Coordinates: 53°19′30.3″N 3°29′20.0″W
- Opened: 1852
- Owner: Royal National Lifeboat Institution

Website
- Rhyl RNLI Lifeboat Station

Rhyl Lifeboat Station (Welsh: Gorsaf Bad Achub Y Rhyl) can be found at East Parade in Rhyl, a seaside town sitting at the mouth of the River Clwyd, on the coast of Denbighshire, North Wales.

A lifeboat was first placed at Rhyl in 1852, by The Shipwrecked Fishermen and Mariners' Royal Benevolent Society (SFMRBS). Management of the station was transferred to the Royal National Lifeboat Institution (RNLI) in 1854.

The station currently operates 13-34 Anthony Kenneth Heard (ON 1341), a Shannon-class All-weather lifeboat (ALB), on station since 2019, and the smaller D-class (IB1) Inshore lifeboat (ILB), Geoff Pearce (D-903), on station since 2025.

== History ==
In 1851, the president of the Royal National Institution for the Preservation of Life from Shipwreck (RNIPLS), The Duke of Northumberland, offered a prize of 100 guineas for the best design for a self-righting lifeboat. The prize was won by boat-builder Mr James Beeching of Great Yarmouth.

On the strength of this award, the SFMRBS purchased a lifeboat for Rhyl, from Beeching. The boat was a 26-foot x 6-foot 6in self-righting 'Pulling and Sailing' (P&S) lifeboat, one with both sails and (8) oars, and was named Gwylan-y-Mor (Sea Gull). A boathouse was constructed between the beach and the river, on the west side of the River Clwyd.

On 22 January 1853, the SFMRBS Rhyl lifeboat Gwylan-y-Mor was launched to the aid of a vessel, thought to be the Lord Ashburton, which had been reported 'de-masted' off West Hoyle. Unable to find the vessel, (reports say the boat later put in at Beaumaris), the lifeboat headed home, but capsized on the return trip. The lifeboat didn't self-right, and six of her nine crew were lost.

Only 3 months earlier, on 1 October 1852, in another Beeching lifeboat, eight SFMRBS lifeboat crew from Lytham had drowned. The lifeboat didn't self-right after capsize. Afterwards it was discovered that doors had been cut into the airtight boxes for storage, and that the water ballast tanks had not been plugged, allowing the water to escape, thus cancelling any self-righting capability.

A damning report was published in "The Lifeboat", dated 1 December 1852, but apparently published after the Rhyl disaster, highlighting the fact that although both boats carried a brass plaque with "Northumberland Prize Boat", neither had been constructed to the same design or standards.

Although modifications were made to the lifeboat, all confidence in the boat had been lost, and although it was officially on service until 1856, the local committee resolved that the boat would not be used again.

On 5 October 1854, under the guidance of the Duke of Northumberland, the RNIPLS became the Royal National Lifeboat Institution. Just two months later, on 7 December 1854, the SFMRBS handed over the management of all their stations and lifeboats, including Rhyl and Lytham, to the RNLI. This was to allow the SFMRBS to concentrate of the welfare of those people rescued.

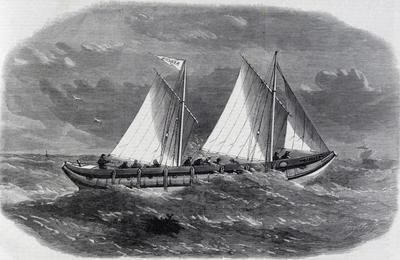
Tubular Lifeboat at New Brighton

On the request of the local committee, and with a view to evaluating its performance, the RNLI commissioned a new design "Tubular" lifeboat, following successful trials of the first boat Challenger, by its inventor H. Richardson, of Bala.

In February 1856, the new 32-foot Tubular lifeboat, constructed by Mr Lees of Manchester, was launched, and towed to Rhyl from Manchester. The lifeboat was constructed using two iron tubes, 32 ft 0 in (9.75 m) x 2 ft 8 in (0.81 m) diameter, divided into eight air-tight compartments, and containing 140 cubic feet of air. The tubes were connected together, and supported a deck of 8 ft 4 in (2.54 m), sitting approximately 11 inches (280 mm) above the water.

It was reported at the meeting of the RNLI committee of management on Thursday 3 September 1867, that the sum of £650 had been received from Miss Ellen Hodgson, executor of the will of the late Mrs Elizabeth Morgan of Cheltenham, for the whole cost of the renovation of the Rhyl lifeboat station in her memory. The lifeboat was subsequently named Morgan. After suffering damage in 1868, the boat was sent for repairs, returning in 1869. The lifeboat continued to serve at Rhyl until 1893.

Whilst the Tubular lifeboat was away for repairs, unusually, the relief lifeboat supplied was a brand new lifeboat. Henry Nixson No.2 had been built for the new Abergele Lifeboat Station. Before even reaching its new station, it was diverted to cover at Rhyl. When the tubular lifeboat returned, it had been decided to establish the new station a little further along the coast at Llanddulas, and a lifeboat station was never established at Abergele.

== 1960s onwards ==
At 01:17 on 17 September 1962, Rhyl Lifeboat Anthony Robert Marshall (ON 869) was launched on service, to the first lifeboat service to a hovercraft. After a season operating between Rhyl and Hoylake, in a north-west gale, the hovercraft had broken adrift, and was in danger of hitting Rhyl promenade. Unable to attach a line, the coxswain manouvered the lifeboat between Hovercraft and shore, rescuing the three crew, and bringing the hovercraft to harbour an hour later when conditions allowed. For this service, Coxswain Harold Campini was awarded the RNLI Silver Medal.

In 1967, the first D-class (RFD PB16) Inshore Lifeboat (D-141) was also put on service in Rhyl, in response to an increasing amount of water-based leisure activity. These were easily launched with just a few people, ideal to respond quickly to local emergencies.

The RNLI Bronze Medal was awarded to Helm Don Archer-Jones in 1973, for the courage and seamanship he displayed, when the ILB rescued two boys cut off by the tide. Both were found clinging to a perch marking the sewer outfall between Rhyl and Prestatyn, in a gale force westerly wind and a rough sea on 7 August. Crew member Paul Frost was awarded a medal service certificate.

The Duke of Kent presented the lifeboat station with an anniversary Vellum in 2002, to celebrate the 150th anniversary of Rhyl Lifeboat Station.

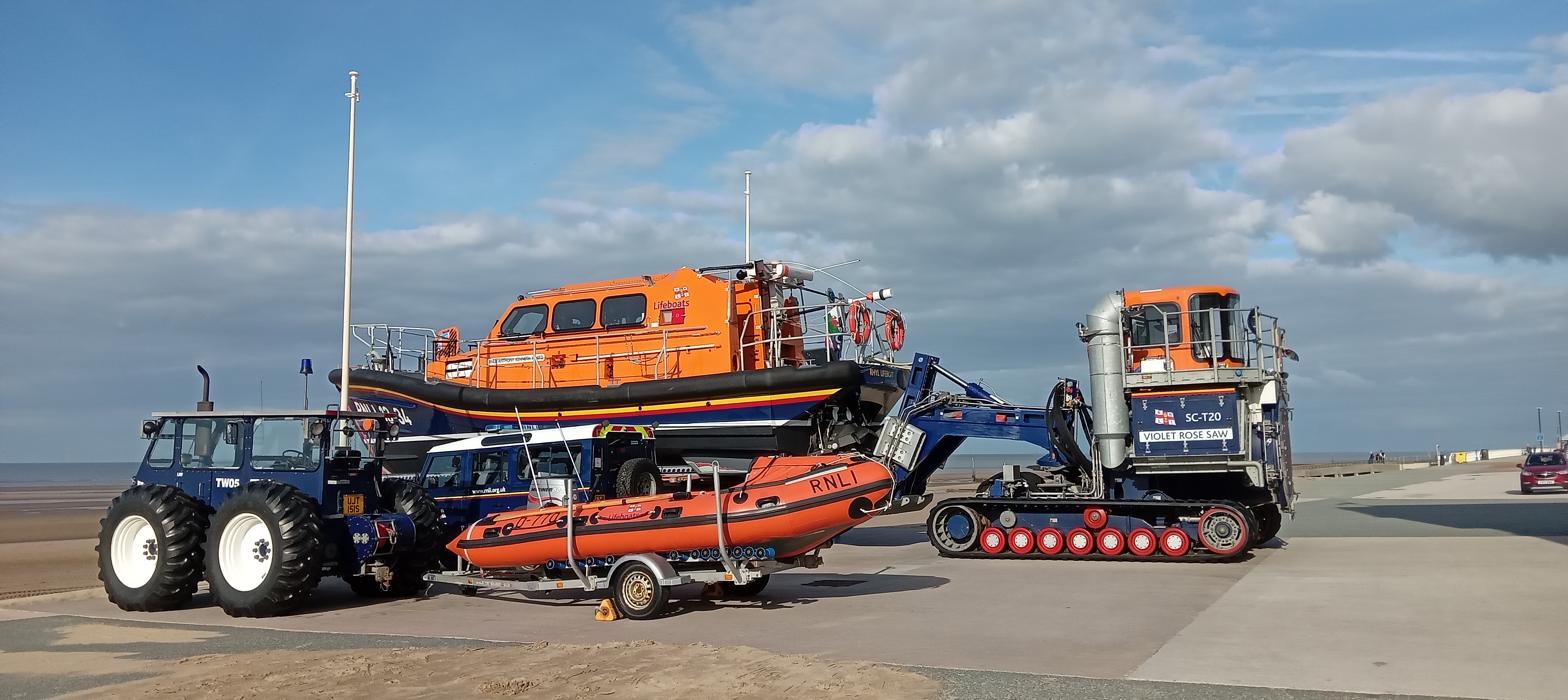
Rhyl lifeboats and launch vehicles

In 2019, the long-serving Mersey-class All-weather lifeboat 12-24 Lil Cunningham (ON 1183) was withdrawn from service. The boat was replaced by a state-of-the-art Shannon-class £2.5M lifeboat, and Shannon Launch and Recovery System (SLARS). The new lifeboat, 13-34 Anthony Kenneth Heard (ON 1341), arrived at Rhyl at 11:45 on Sunday 13 October 2019, escorted by the station’s current lifeboats Lil Cunningham and D-class Mary Maxwell (D-770), and former Rhyl Oakley-class lifeboat 37-22 Har Lil (ON 993).

== Description ==
The lifeboat station is built on the promenade in Rhyl. The building contains the All-weather lifeboat (ALB) with Shannon Launch and Recovery System (SLARS), Inshore lifeboat (ILB), launched with a marinised County Tractor, and a Land-Rover Defender, used for Search and Rescue operations off the coast of Rhyl. The station also has a short concrete slipway that leads down to the beach. Each boat is kept on a carriage attached to a tractor which propels it down to the water and brings it back after use. A fundraising shop is situated on the west side of the boathouse.

== Area of operation ==
The Shannon-class All-Weather lifeboat at Rhyl has a top speed of 25 knots (46 km/h). The lifeboat can cover an area from Colwyn Bay (west) to Mostyn (east). North of the station the All-Weather lifeboat covers the Oil and Gas platforms of the Douglas and Hamilton fields, and also the windfarms of North Hoyle; Rhyl Flats; and the Gwynt-Y-Mor fields. Rhyl Lifeboat is a part of the contingency plan for any evacuation of the rigs. The area also covers the outer approaches to Liverpool. Adjacent ALBs are at Llandudno to the west, and Hoylake to the east. There is an ILB station at both Flint and West Kirby to the east.

== Notable rescues ==
- 1962 - ALB, First service ever made by a lifeboat to a hovercraft
- 1973 - ILB, Rescue to children stuck on sewer outfall
- 1990 - Towyn and Pensarn floods
- 2011 - ALB, Rescue kayaker with hypothermia
- 2011 - ILB, Rescue to mother and son with hypothermia
- 2012 - ALB, Rescue to cargo ship off Llanddulas

== Station honours ==
The following are awards made at Rhyl.

- RNLI Silver Medal
  Harold Louis Campini, Coxswain – 1962
- RNLI Bronze Medal
  Don Archer-Jones, Helm – 1973
- Medal Service Certificate
  Paul Frost, crew member – 1973
- 'The Thanks of the Institution inscribed on Vellum'
  Robert Hughes, Honorary Secretary – 1872
  Rhyl lifeboat crew – 1962
  Donald Jones, Helm – 1974
  Richard Perrin, crew member – 1974
  James Quinn, crew member – 1974
- 'A Framed Letter of Thanks signed by the Chairman of the Institution'
  Edward Jones – 1872
  Shore Crew – 1962
  Martin Jones, Mechanic – 2001
- British Empire Medal
  Bruce Arnold Herbert, Coxswain – 1991QBH
- Member, Order of the British Empire (MBE)
  Jean Olive Frost, Manageress of the Rhyl Lifeboat Souvenir Shop – 2008NYH
  Paul Frost, crew member – 2011QBH
  Martin Peter Jones, Coxswain – 2017NYH

== Roll of honour ==
In memory of those lost whilst serving at Rhyl:

- Lost when the lifeboat capsized and failed to self-right, on service to the Lord Ashburton, 22 January 1853.
  John Edwards
  John Evans
  David George
  Phillip Jones
  Thomas Jones
  William Parry

== Rhyl lifeboats ==
=== No.1 Station ===
ON (Note: ON is the RNLI's Official Number of the boat.)	Name	Built	On station	Class	Comments
Pre-244	Gwylan-y-Môr (Seagull)	1852	1852–1856	26-foot Beeching self-righting (P&S)	(Note: 26 ft 0 in (7.92 m) x 6 ft 6 in (1.98 m) (8-oared) Beeching self-righting (P&S) lifeboat, funded by the SFMRBS, built by James Beeching of Great Yarmouth, costing £112.)
70	Unnamed	1856	1856–1867	32-foot Tubular (P&S)	(Note: 32 ft 0 in (9.75 m) x 8 ft 4 in (2.54 m) (12-oared) Tubular-class non-self-righting (P&S) lifeboat, funded by the RNLI, built by William Lees of Manchester, costing £203. Funds appropriated from the legacy of Mrs Morgan of Cheltenham in 1867.); Named Morgan in 1867. Removed for repairs after damage in 1868. Returned to station in 1869.
70	Morgan	1856	1867–1868	32-foot Tubular (P&S)	Removed for repairs after damage in 1868. Returned to station in 1869.
Pre-490	Henry Nixson No.2	1867	1868–1869	33-foot Peake self-righting (P&S)	(Note: 33 ft 0 in (10.06 m) x 8 ft 7 in (2.62 m) (10-oared) Peake-class self-righting (P&S) lifeboat, legacy of Mr H. Nixson of Manchester, built by Forrestt of Limehouse, London, costing £292.); Intended lifeboat for Abergele, diverted as relief whilst ON 70 repaired. Later placed at Llanddulas.
70	Morgan	1856	1869–1893	32-foot Tubular (P&S)	Sold in 1893.
287	Caroline Richardson	1891	1893–1897	35-foot 6in Tubular (P&S)	(Note: 35 ft 6 in (10.82 m) x 10 ft 0 in (3.05 m) (14-oared) Tubular-class non-self-righting (P&S) lifeboat, legacy of Mr H. Richardson of Bala, built by Mechan and Son of Glasgow, costing £633 when new.); Previously at Pwllheli. Transferred to the relief fleet, but broken up in 1899.
398	Caroline Richardson	1896	1897–1939	34-foot Tubular (P&S)	(Note: 34 ft 0 in (10.36 m) x 8 ft 10 in (2.69 m) (12-oared) Tubular-class non-self-righting (P&S) lifeboat, legacy of Mr H. Richardson of Bala, built by Thames Ironworks of Blackwall, London, costing £548.); Sold in 1939. Reported scrapped in 1952.

Pre ON numbers are unofficial numbers used by the Lifeboat Enthusiasts' Society to reference early lifeboats not included on the official RNLI list.}}

=== No.2 Station ===
ON	Name	Built	On station	Class	Comments
Pre-457	Jane Dalton	1866	1878–1888	33-foot self-righting (P&S)	(Note: 34 ft 0 in (10.36 m) x 8 ft 10 in (2.69 m) (10-oared) self-righting (P&S) lifeboat, funded by the anonymous gift of "D", built by Forrestt of Limehouse, London, costing £280 when new.); Previously Robert Raikes at Brighton. Sold in 1888.
166	Jane Martin	1888	1888–1899	34-foot self-righting (P&S)	(Note: 34 ft 0 in (10.36 m) x 8 ft 0 in (2.44 m) (10-oared) self-righting (P&S) lifeboat, legacy of Mrs Martin of Pershore, built by Woolfe of Shadwell, London, costing £377.); Broken up in 1899.

No.2 Station closed in 1899

=== Motor lifeboats ===
ON	Op.No. (Note: Op. No. is the RNLI's Operational Number of the boat carried on the hull.)	Name	Built	On station	Class	Comments
835	–	The Gordon Warren	1939	1939–1949	Surf	
869	–	Anthony Robert Marshall	1949	1949–1968	Liverpool	Transferred to the relief fleet, later at Pwllheli.
993	37-22	Har Lil	1968	1968–1990	Oakley	
1000	37-29	Mary Gabriel	1973	1990–1992	Rother	Previously at Hoylake.
1183	12-24	Lil Cunningham	1992	1992–2019	Mersey	
1341	13-34	Anthony Kenneth Heard	2019	2019–	Shannon	

More post-service details can be found on the respective lifeboat class pages.

=== Inshore lifeboats ===
==== D class ====
Op.No.	Name	On station	Class	Comments
D-141	Unnamed	1967–1975	D-class (RFD PB16)	
D-243	Unnamed	1976–1987	D-class (Zodiac III)	
D-348	Banks' Staff I	1987–1995	D-class (EA16)	
D-485	Stafford with Rugeley	1995–2004	D-class (EA16)	
D-632	Godfrey and Desmond Nall	2004–2014	D-class (IB1)	
D-770	Mary Maxwell	2014–2025	D-class (IB1)	
D-903	Geoff Pearce	2025–	D-class (IB1)	

=== Launch and recovery tractors (ALB) ===
Op.No.	Reg. No.	Type	On station	Comments
T6	DM 3318	Clayton	1921–1938	
T12	LLY 75	Clayton	1938–1940	
T37	GGF 497	Case L	1940–1954	
T53	KXT 421	Case LA	1954–1955	
T63	PXF 163	Fowler Challenger III	1955–1963	
T60	OXO 323	Fowler Challenger III	1963–1972	
T67	YLD 792	Fowler Challenger III	1972–1974	
T58	OJJ 312	Fowler Challenger III	1974–1975	
T68	YUV 742	Fowler Challenger III	1975–1978	
T60	OXO 323	Fowler Challenger III	1978–1983	
T67	YLD 792	Fowler Challenger III	1983–1984	
T92	A462 AUX	Talus MB-H Crawler	1984–1997	
T91	UAW 558Y	Talus MB-H Crawler	1997–2007	
T93	A496 CUX	Talus MB-H Crawler	2007–2019	
SC-T20	HF19 EHH	SLARS (Clayton)	2019–	Named Violet Rose Saw

=== Launch and recovery tractors (ILB) ===
Op.No.	Reg. No.	Type	On station	Comments
TA09	KLG 681Y	Ford 4000	<1993–1995	
TA25	PHS 545V	County 1184	1995–1998	
TA35	Q678 BRM	County 1184	1998–2003	
TW33	M562 OUX	Talus MB-764 County	2002–2006	
TW31	L526 JUJ	Talus MB-764 County	2006–2008	
TW44	S193 RUJ	Talus MB-764 County	2008–2010	
ST02	WA54 HRP	Softrak Loglogic	2010–2012	
TW05	UJT 151S	Talus MB-764 County	2012–	

== See also ==
- List of RNLI stations
- List of former RNLI stations
- Royal National Lifeboat Institution lifeboats
