= Hugh Bennett =

Hugh Bennett may refer to:

- Hugh Hammond Bennett (1881–1960), soil conservation pioneer
- Hugh Bennett (cricketer) (1862–1943), English cricketer
- Hugh Bennett (film director) (1892–1950), American film director and editor
