= Poltair School =

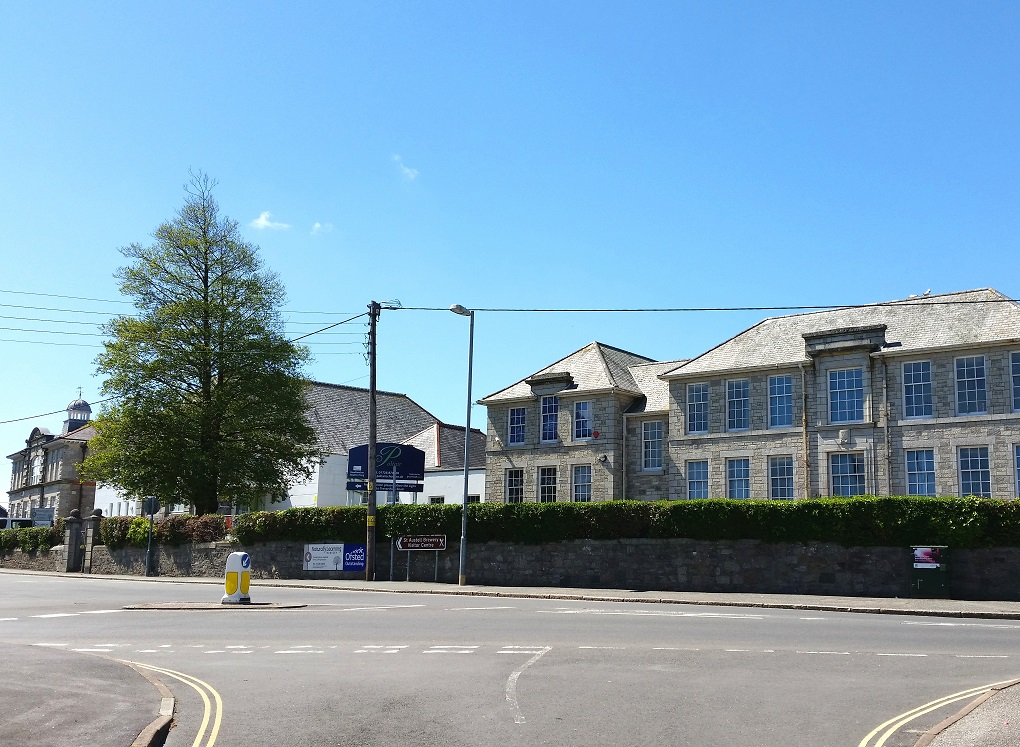

Location
- Trevarthian Road; St Austell, Cornwall, PL25 4BZ; England; 50°20′35″N 4°47′11″W

Information
- Type: Academy
- Established: 1907
- Local authority: Cornwall Council
- Trust: Cornwall Education Learning Trust
- Department for Education URN: 147442 Tables
- Ofsted: Reports
- Headteacher: Mark Everett
- Gender: Coeducational
- Age: 11 to 16
- Enrolment: 803
- Colours: Traditionally bottle-green, currently Light grey and red,
- Website: http://www.poltairschool.co.uk

Poltair School is a coeducational secondary school located on the site of the former St Austell Grammar School in St Austell, Cornwall, England. It is run by the Cornwall Education Learning Trust.

== Admissions ==
It has educational links with schools in Dithmarchen, Germany, notably the Gymnasium Heide-Ost. It has also had links with Collège des Quatre Vents in Lanmeur, Brittany, France.

== History ==
=== Grammar school ===
It was founded in 1907.

=== Comprehensive ===
It became comprehensive in 1971, at the same time that it lost its sixth form. St Austell Sixth Form College was built at the same time next to the Mid-Cornwall College of Further Education on Palace Road. These merged in 1993 to form St Austell College, opposite the school.

In 2007, Poltair School held its centenary, which included guided tours of the school, a service at St John's Methodist Church, and celebrations at St Austell's Eden Project.

=== Academy ===
In September 2019 Poltair School converted to academy status and is now sponsored by the Cornwall Education & Learning Trust.

== Buildings ==
The school has recently undergone a £5 million redevelopment programme, which included a new main hall, dining hall, radio studio, and dance/drama facilities, amongst other additions.

The school launched a full student radio station, Inferno Radio, in 2004. This is no longer running.

== Academic performance ==
The school's GCSE pass rate increased 16% in the 2 years up until July 2007. However its GCSE pass rate is well below the England average, and the second lowest in Cornwall (above Redruth School).

== Notable former pupils ==
- Steve Baker, former Conservative MP (2010-2024) for Wycombe
- Steve Double, former Conservative MP (2015-2024) for St Austell and Newquay
- Andrew Patrick, British High Commissioner to Sri Lanka and British Ambassador to Myanmar

=== St Austell County Grammar School ===
- Robert Duncan, actor
- Felicity Goodey, former presenter on Radio 4 and BBC North West Tonight
- Sir Laurence Martin, Vice-Chancellor from 1978 to 1990 of Newcastle University, and gave the BBC's Reith Lecture in 1981.
- John Nettles, actor
- Edward Rowe, Cornish comedian and theatre actor (AKA:Kernow King)
- A. L. Rowse, academic and author.
- Robin Skynner, psychiatrist, known for 1983 book Families and How to Survive Them
- L. H. C. Tippett, statistician
- David Tremlett, artist
- Fred Trethewey, former Archdeacon of Dudley
