= Pwllheli Lifeboat Station =

RNLI lifeboat station in Gwynedd, Wales

- Gorsaf Bad Achub Pwllheli

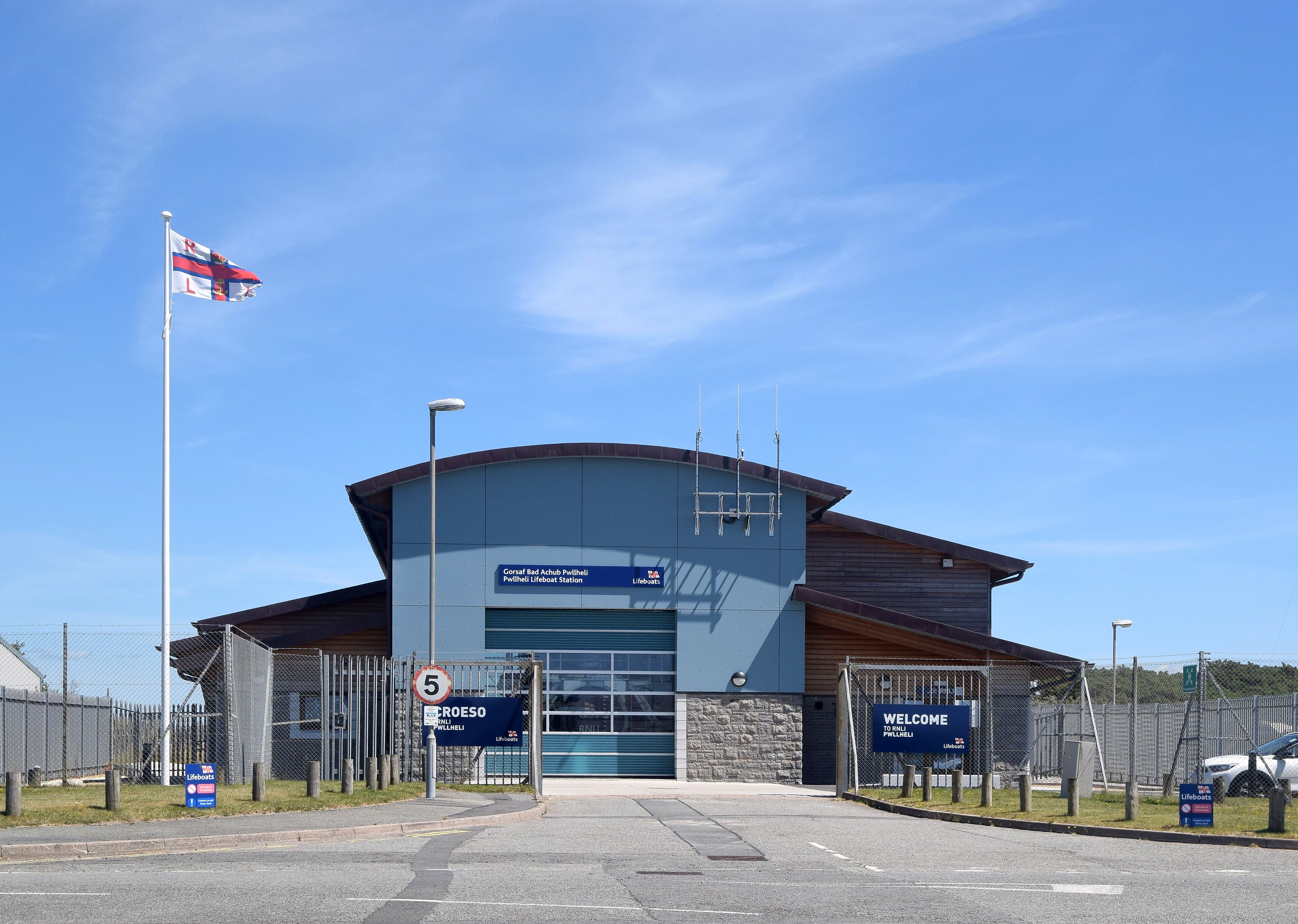
- Pwllheli Lifeboat Station

- Location within Gwynedd

General information
- Type: RNLI Lifeboat Station
- Location: Glan Y Don Industrial Estate, Pwllheli, Gwynedd, Wales, LL53 5YT, United Kingdom
- Coordinates: 52°53′12.5″N 4°24′14.0″W
- Opened: 1891
- Owner: Royal National Lifeboat Institution

Website
- Pwllheli RNLI Lifeboat Station

Pwllheli Lifeboat Station (Welsh: Gorsaf Bad Achub Pwllheli) is located at Glan Y Don Industrial Estate, in Pwllheli, a town which sits on the south-east coast of the Llŷn Peninsula, in the historic county of Gwynedd, Wales.

A lifeboat station was first established at Pwllheli by the Royal National Lifeboat Institution (RNLI) in 1891.

The station currently operates 13-39 Smith Brothers (ON 1346), a Shannon-class All-weather lifeboat, on station since 2021, and the smaller D-class (IB1) Inshore lifeboat, Robert J Wright (D-811), on station since 2017.

== History ==
It is said that the first lifeboat at Pwllheli was placed in the care of Pwllheli Town Council, following the death of Lifeboat Designer Henry Thomas Richardson in 1878, but there are no service records, and no mention of what became of the boat.

Henry Richardson, and his son Henry Thomas Richardson, were the inventors of a type of lifeboat known as the 'Tubular'. The Tubular lifeboat was effectively a type of catamaran, or raft, with a flat deck mounted between two buoyant tubes. The deck of the boat is said to have been 11 inches above the water. This type of craft found favour at Rhyl and New Brighton, but few places otherwise.

When Henry T. Richardson, then of Brynhrfryd, Pwllheli, died on 21 November 1878, he bequeathed to the RNLI, at the death of his wife, the sum of £10,000, to include the provision of two tubular lifeboats, their ongoing maintenance, and the opening of a lifeboat station in Pwllheli. After communication with the Town Clerk in August 1886, the RNLI agreed to open a lifeboat station at Pwllheli.

A boathouse, designed by RNLI Architect Mr. W. T. Douglas, was constructed by E. Williams on a site owned by the town council at Gimblet Rock, at a cost of £609-14s-0d. A 14-oared 35-feet 6in long Tubular-class boat was built by Mechan & Co, of Glasgow, costing £633, and following trials in Liverpool, arrived in Pwllheli in April 1891. It was later named Caroline Richardson (ON 287), after the donor's mother.

It is with some irony, that the Tubular lifeboat designed by the founder of the station, was not liked by the crew. It served just one year at Pwllheli, being launched just once, before it was transferred to Rhyl. In fact, such was the dislike for this type of boat, that the RNLI went to court to gain permission to reallocate the funds to standard type lifeboats, which was granted.

A replacement for the Tubular lifeboat arrived in November 1892, Margaret Platt of Stalybridge (ON 330), a 38 ft (12 m) self-righting 'Pulling and Sailing' (P&S) lifeboat, one using sails and (12) oars, built by McAlister, at a cost of £423. In just six years on service, she would be launched eight times, and rescue 28 people.

=== 1930 onwards ===
Pwllheli received its first motor lifeboat in 1930; the 40-hp 40-foot Watson-class lifeboat Maria (ON 560). After successful trials, it was followed the following year with a permanent boat, the larger 43-foot Watson-class William McPherson (ON 620). Due to its size, the boat was moored afloat. With a motor-lifeboat placed at Pwllheli, the flanking stations at Criccieth and Abersoch were closed.

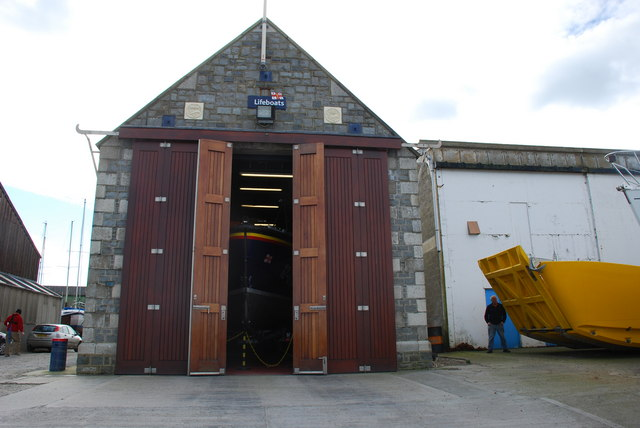
1891 Pwllheli Lifeboat Station

For some time, silting at the entrance to Pwllheli harbour prevented the lifeboat getting out at dead-low water. On 3 September 1951, Pwllheli lifeboat was called to the capsized sailing boat Dorothy from Morfa Bychann public school camp, but couldn't get away. By the time the Barmouth lifeboat arrived, a School Master and four boys had drowned. Investigations into the accident resulted in the reopening of Criccieth Lifeboat Station in 1953, and the placement of a smaller carriage-based Liverpool-class lifeboat at Pwllheli, Katherine and Virgoe Buckland (ON 905), which would be housed in the boathouse. The building had doors at both ends, allowing the boat to be launched, using a new tractor, either into the harbour, or over the beach into the sea.

In 1964, in response to an increasing amount of water-based leisure activity, the RNLI placed 25 small fast Inshore rescue boats (IRB), later known as an Inshore lifeboat (ILB), around the country. These were easily launched with just a few people, ideal to respond quickly to local emergencies. Pwllheli was one of the first stations with an Inshore lifeboat, with the arrival of a D-class (RFD PB16) (D-16) in 1964.

On a call to a grounded yacht on 20 September 2015, long serving Coxswain Robert Wright MBE collapsed of a suspected heart attack as the lifeboat reached the casualty, and died shortly afterwards. In 2017, the new D-class (IB1) Inshore lifeboat was named Robert J Wright (D-811), in memory of the former Pwllheli coxswain.

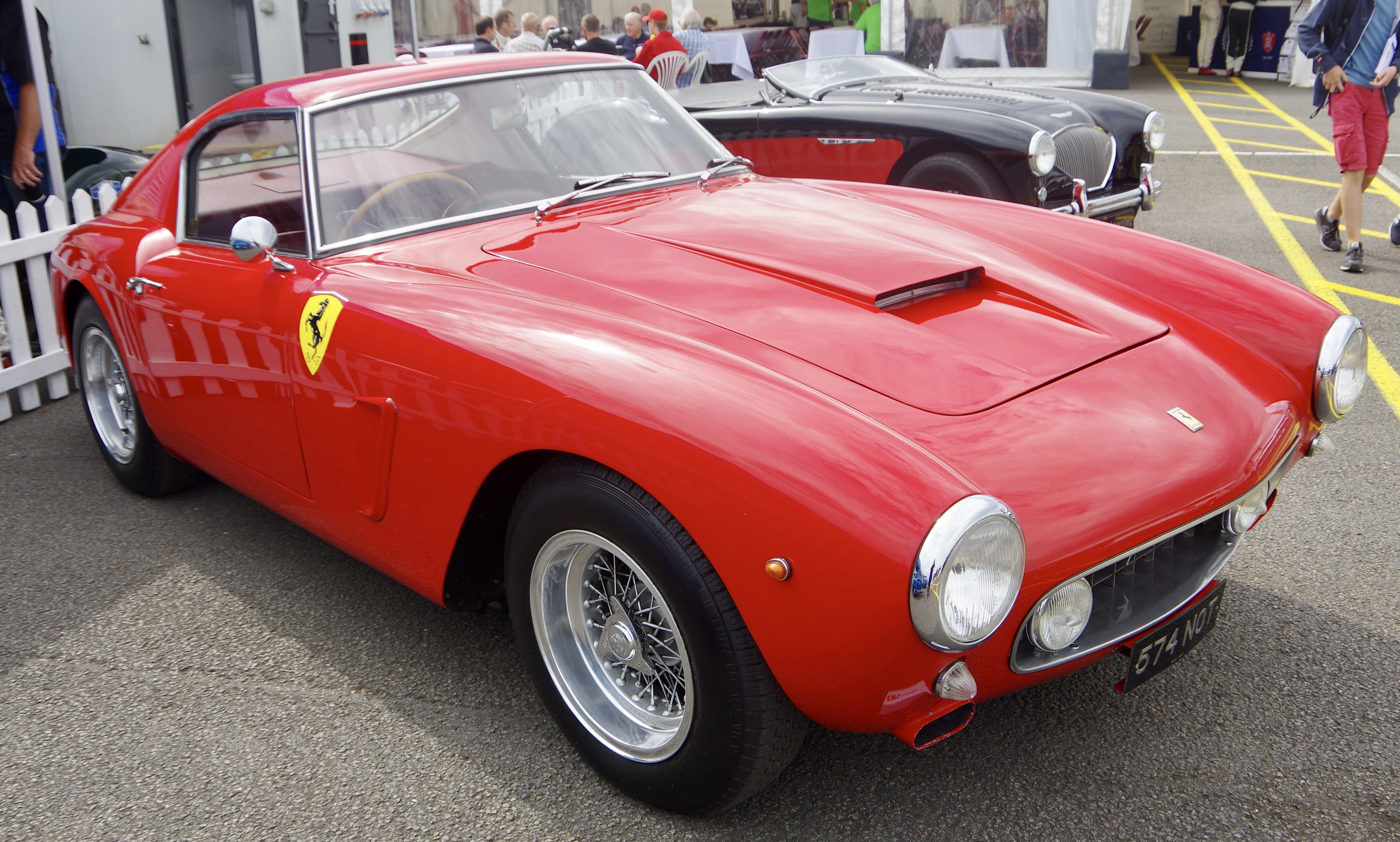
Ferrari 250 GT SWB 1995GT

In 2015, the RNLI received the most valuable items ever left to the Institution in a single legacy. In a most extraordinary bequest, the RNLI received two rare Ferrari cars from the estate of the late Richard Colton, businessman. Both were sent to auction:

- A silver 1967 Ferrari 275 GTB/4, sold for £1.93 million
- A red 1960 Ferrari 250 GT SWB, sold for £6.6 million

This donation has already helped fund two Shannon-class lifeboats, 13-28 Richard and Caroline Colton (ON 1335) based at Hastings, and 13-51 Richard and Caroline Colton II (ON 1358) at Barry Dock. £100,000 raised locally to help provide a new boathouse for Pwllheli was boosted massively by the allocation of £2.8m from the Colton legacy. A new state-of-the-art boathouse was constructed at Glan-Y-Don, completed in 2020, which was opened officially in September 2021 to house their new Shannon lifeboat 13-39 Smith Brothers (ON 1346).

In January 2024, following a breakdown in crew relationships, the station was closed, and the Shannon-class lifeboat was removed to RNLI headquarters at Poole, and temporarily placed into the Relief fleet. All volunteer crew were stood down. The station reopened on 3 April 2024 to allow limited operation of the D-class lifeboat, whilst further crew training would continue.

Shannon lifeboat 13-39 Smith Brothers (ON 1346) returned to Pwllheli on 30 June 2024, allowing for a period of intensive crew training to commence on 1 July 2024, before the boat returned to active duty.

== Station honours ==
The following are awards made at Pwllheli:

- 'The Thanks of the Institution inscribed on Vellum'
  W. McGill, Acting Coxswain – 1972
  Roy Morris, crew member – 1972
  Robert John Wright, Coxswain – 1994
- A Framed Letter of Thanks signed by the Chairman of the Institution
  Clive Moore, Emergency Mechanic – 1994
  Robert Wright, Coxswain – 2003
  Andy Green, Helm – 2007
- Member, Order of the British Empire (MBE)
  Robert John Wright, Coxswain – 2008QBH

== Roll of honour ==
In memory of those lost whilst serving at Pwllheli:

- Collapsed of a suspected heart attack whilst on call to a grounded yacht, and died soon afterwards, 20 September 2015
  Robert John Wright, Coxswain (62)

== Pwllheli lifeboats ==
=== Pulling and sailing (P&S) lifeboats ===
ON (Note: ON is the RNLI's Official Number of the boat.)	Name	Built	On station	Class	Comments
287	Caroline Richardson	1891	1891–1892	35-foot 6in Tubular (P&S)	(Note: 35 ft 6 in (10.82 m) x 10 ft 0 in (3.05 m) (14-oared) Tubular-class (P&S) lifeboat, legacy of Mr H. T. Richardson of Bala, built by Machan & Son of Glasgow, costing £633); Transferred to Rhyl.
330	Margaret Platt of Stalybridge	1892	1892–1898	38-foot self-righting (P&S)	(Note: 38 ft 0 in (11.58 m) x 8 ft 0 in (2.44 m) (14-oared) self-righting (P&S) lifeboat, legacy of Mrs M. Platt of Stalybridge, built by McAlister of Dumbarton, costing £423); Sold in 1898.
418	Margaret Platt of Stalybridge	1898	1898–1930	38-foot Watson (P&S)	(Note: 38 ft 0 in (11.58 m) x 9 ft 4 in (2.84 m) (12-oared) Watson-class non-self-righting (P&S) lifeboat, legacy of Mrs M. Platt of Stalybridge, built by S. Strickland of Dartmouth, Devon, costing £644); Sold in 1932. Renamed Freckles. Last reported in Pwllheli in 1932.

=== Motor lifeboats ===
ON	Op.No. (Note: Op. No. is the RNLI's Operational Number of the boat carried on the hull.)	Name	Built	On station	Class	Comments
560	–	Maria	1909	1930–1931	40-foot Watson	Previously at Portpatrick and Broughty Ferry.
620	–	William McPherson	1912	1931–1940	43-foot Watson	Previously at Campbeltown and Aldeburgh.
690	–	C.and S.	1925	1940–1943	45-foot Watson	Previously at Dunmore East. Transferred to the relief fleet, later at Valentia.
841	–	Manchester & Salford XXIX	1943	1943–1953	46-foot Watson	Transferred to Workington
905	–	Katherine and Virgoe Buckland	1952	1953–1972	Liverpool	
869	–	Anthony Robert Marshall	1949	1972–1979	Liverpool	Previously at Rhyl
978	37-11	The Royal Thames	1964	1979–1991	37-foot Oakley	Previously at Caister and Runswick. Transferred to Clogherhead.
1168	12-010	Lilly and Vincent Anthony	1990	1991–2021	Mersey	
1346	13-39	Smith Brothers	2021	2021–	Shannon	

More post-service details can be found on the respective lifeboat class pages.

=== Inshore lifeboats ===
Op.No.	Name	On station	Class	Comments
D-16	Unnamed	1964	D-class (RFD PB16)	
D-20	Unnamed	1965–1966	D-class (RFD PB16)	
D-25	Unnamed	1967	D-class (RFD PB16)	
D-153	Unnamed	1968–1978	D-class (RFD PB16)	
D-265	Unnamed	1979–1988	D-class (RFD PB16)	
D-372	The Lion	1988–1997	D-class (EA16)	
D-522	City of Chester II	1997–2007	D-class (EA16)	
D-676	Leslie and Peter Downes	2007–2017	D-class (IB1)	
D-811	Robert J Wright	2017–	D-class (IB1)	

=== Launch and recovery tractors ===
Op.No.	Reg. No.	Type	On station	Comments
T53	KXT 421	Case LA	1953	
T58	OJJ 312	Fowler Challenger III	1953–1965	
T63	PXF 163	Fowler Challenger III	1965–1975	
T79	DLB 481C	Case 1000D	1975–1976	
T66	XYP 400	Fowler Challenger III	1976–1986	
T68	YUV 742	Fowler Challenger III	1986–1987	
T103	E589 WAW	Talus MB-H Crawler	1987–2001	
T98	C168 NAW	Talus MB-H Crawler	2000–2011	
T94	B567 FAW	Talus MB-H Crawler	2011–2022	
SC-T24	HF70 EBK	SLARS (Clayton)	2021–	Named John Llewellyn Mostyn Hughes

== See also ==
- List of RNLI stations
- List of former RNLI stations
- Royal National Lifeboat Institution lifeboats
