= Feek =

Feek is a surname. Notable people with the surname include:

- Florence Feek (1876–1940), English suffragette and Post Office worker
- Greg Feek (born 1975), New Zealand rugby union player
- Heidi Feek (born 1986), American singer and songwriter
- Joey Feek (1975–2016), American country music singer and songwriter
- Rory Feek (born 1965), American country music singer and songwriter
