= John Gathercole =

British Archdeacon

John Robert Gathercole (23 April 1937 – 8 October 2010) was Archdeacon of Dudley from 1987 until 2001.

Gathercole was educated at The Judd School, Tonbridge and Fitzwilliam College, Cambridge; and ordained after a period of study at Ridley Hall, Cambridge in 1963. After curacies in Durham and Croxdale he was Social and Industrial Adviser to the Bishop of Durham from 1967 to 1970. He was the Industrial Chaplain at Redditch from 1970 to 1987; Rural Dean of Bromsgrove from 1978 to 1985; Team Leader and Senior Chaplain to the Worcester Industrial Mission from 1985 to 1991; Rural Dean of Droitwich from 2007 to 2008; and a Member of the General Synod of the Church of England from 1995 to 2001.

Church of England titles
Preceded by Robin Bennett	Archdeacon of Dudley; 1987–2001	Succeeded by Fred Trethewey
