= Sydney James (priest) =

Sydney Rhodes James CBE (born Aldeburgh 30 May 1855 – died Leatherhead 10 February 1934) was Archdeacon of Dudley from 1921 until his death.

James was educated at Haileybury and Trinity College, Cambridge. James was the older brother of Montague Rhodes James, the medievalist scholar and author of ghost stories. He was an Assistant Master at Eton from 1879 to 1897, in which year he was ordained as a priest in the Church of England. He was Headmaster of Malvern College from 1897 to 1914. At Malvern, he gained the nickname "Scrubby".

During his years in education, James was also an officer in the Territorial Army and was awarded the Volunteer Decoration in 1902.

On 14 February 1934 two funeral services were held simultaneously, one in Worcester Cathedral and one at Holy Trinity Church, Bembridge where he worshipped when on holiday.

Church of England titles
Preceded by Inaugural appointment	Archdeacon of Dudley; 1921–1934	Succeeded by Arthur Pearce Shepherd
