= Robin Bennett (priest) =

British Anglican archdeacon (1934–2019)

Robin Bennett (6 November 1934 – 18 March 2019) was a British Anglican clergyman who was Archdeacon of Dudley from 1985 until 1986. He later converted to the Society of Friends, and worked as an adult educator.

== Biography ==
Bennett was born on 6 November 1934. He was educated at Northgate Grammar School, Ipswich and St John's College, Durham; and ordained in 1961. After curacies and incumbencies in Essex and East London he was Principal of the Aston Training Scheme from 1977. Bennett left the Church of England in 1988 to join the Society of Friends. He was Principal of Wandsworth Adult College from 1989 to 1995. Bennett died on 18 March 2019, at the age of 84.

Church of England titles
Preceded by Christopher Campling	Archdeacon of Dudley; 1985–1986	Succeeded by John Gathercole
