= Fred Trethewey =

British archdeacon

Frederick Martyn Trethewey (born 24 January 1949) was the Archdeacon of Dudley until his retirement in September 2013.

Trethewey was educated at St Austell Grammar School and Bedford College, London. He was ordained in 1978 and was a curate at St Mark's with St Anne's Tollington Park and St Andrew's Whitehall Park before becoming a team vicar at Hornsey then vicar of Brockmoor. He was Rural Dean of Himley from 1996 to 2001.

He was born in Cornwall and went to St Austell Boys Grammar School from 1960 to 1967.

Church of England titles
| Preceded by John Gathercole | Archdeacon of Dudley; 2001–2013 | Succeeded by Nikki Groarke |
