= Felicity Goodey =

Felicity Goodey CBE DL
- Born: Felicity Margaret Sue Goodey; July 1949 (age 77); Plymouth, Devon, England
- Education: St Hugh's College, Oxford
- Occupations: Journalist and presenter
- Employer: BBC

Felicity Margaret Sue Goodey CBE DL (born 1949) is a former BBC journalist and presenter. She was a leading figure in the redevelopment of Salford Quays, including The Lowry and MediaCityUK.

== Early life ==
Goodey attended St Austell Grammar School then read history at St Hugh's College, Oxford.

== Career ==
Goodey spent 28 years at the BBC as an industrial and political correspondent, including as a presenter of the current affairs radio programme File on 4. She regularly appeared on BBC North West regional television news programmes Look North and North West Tonight.

She gave up broadcasting in 1998 to become a founder director of the Northwest Regional Development Agency, chairing the team responsible for developing tourism. She led the team that funded, built and operated The Lowry theatre and gallery complex in Salford Quays, Greater Manchester, and became lifelong president of the Lowry Centre Trust. Salford City Council invited Goodey to help set up Central Salford, the largest Urban Regeneration Company in the country, to redevelop the City of Salford. From 2006, she led the consortium that persuaded the BBC to relocate a major part of its operations from London to the North of England, establishing the MediaCityUK media hub development.

Goodey has been a non executive director of Nord Anglia, a director of Greater Manchester Chamber of Commerce and a council member of the University of Salford. She was chairman of the University Hospital of South Manchester NHS Foundation Trust between 2007 and 2014.

She became president of Cheshire Wildlife Trust in 2011, and is a governor of the Royal Northern College of Music.

== Recognition ==
Goody was appointed CBE in the 2001 Birthday Honours as chairman of the Lowry Trust, for services to the regeneration of Salford Quays.

She is a Deputy Lieutenant of Greater Manchester and an honorary fellow of the Royal Institute of British Architects.

She has received a number of honorary degrees including from Manchester Metropolitan University in 2000, the University of Manchester in 2003, and University of Central Lancashire in 2005.

She is the chair of the Buxton International Festival Board of Trustees.

== Personal life ==
Goodey is married to John Marsh, a former industrialist and headhunter. They have two adult sons.
