= Kay Kinsman =

- Born: Katherine Nixon Bell; June 27, 1909; Los Angeles
- Died: 1998 (aged 88–89); Sherbrooke, Quebec
- Education: Parson's School of Fine and Applied Art in Paris, L’Ecole Amédée Ozenfant

Katherine Nixon Bell (June 27, 1909 – 1998), known as Kay Kinsman, was an artist, writer and student of history and languages. She is noted for her works created with watercolour or in pen and ink depicting street views and everyday life. As an artist and writer, Kinsman published three sketchbooks and her works were also exhibited in England and Quebec.

Kinsman was born in Los Angeles, and her father died before her birth. After her mother's death at age 9, Kinsman lived with her grandmother in Cuba, schooling in Jamaica. Throughout her life, Kinsman spent time abroad studying in Paris, living in Switzerland and England, and spent her final years living and studying in Quebec, Canada.

At the age of 89, Kinsman died at her final home of Sherbrooke, Quebec. Kinsman spent the last two decades of her life focusing on her academic life studying art, history, languages, drama and classics at Bishop's University, Sherbrooke. Kinsman accepted numerous degrees including a master's degree from McGill University and multiple bachelor's degrees from Bishop's University where she spent a significant portion of her later-life. After her death, various drawings and materials used by Kinsman were donated to the Archives Department of the Eastern Townships Resource Centre, Sherbrooke

== Early life ==
Kinsman was born in Los Angeles on June 27, 1909. Prior to her birth, Kinsman's father died of typhus. After his death, Kinsman and her mother spent time living in Mexico, where her grandfather worked on a railway. After her grandfather's imprisonment during the revolution, in 1911, Kinsman and her mother fled back to the United States. There is a story about how Kinsman, aged four, was expelled from a convent school in Texas after she drew a priest sitting on a bathroom toilet. After Kinsman's mother remarried, the family moved to Cuba while Kinsman spent her elementary years in school in Jamaica. While visiting her daughter in Jamaica, Kinsman's mother died. Kinsman was nine years old. Once graduated and living in Cuba, Kinsman started working as a junior reporter of the Havana Times, although she soon left the position to study fine art abroad.

== Education and career ==
=== Paris ===
After receiving an inheritance in 1930 and leaving the reporting job at the Havana Times, Kinsman travelled to study at the Parson's School of Fine and Applied Art in Paris, France. Afterward, Kinsman also studied in at L’Ecole Ozenfant under Amédée Ozenfant.

=== Montreal, Quebec ===
After Kinsman's first move to Montreal with her husband and children, Kinsman continued her studies of fine arts at the Montreal Museum School of Fine Arts from 1945 to 1949 while painting and raising her children. There, Kinsman studied under Anne Savage and Dr. Arthur Lismer. Kinsman's works created in Montreal illustrate her "interest in the city." She was described in the Montreal Star: "Kay Kinsman waits for a sunny day without much wind. Then she bundles together her watercolours and sets off by bus from her Cote des Neiges apartment to the foot of McGill Street where she explores along St. Paul to St. Gabriel, or Bonsecours, in search of something worth preserving." At the age of 57, Kinsman had earned her diploma in piano from the Royal Toronto Conservatory of Music. In 1967, Kinsman published her Montreal Sketchbook to mark the Canadian Centennial.

=== England ===
In 1972, after her husband's death, Kinsman left Canada to live in England and be closer to her family. There, she lived in the Cotswolds village of Broadway. She also lived in the village of Pershore. There, Kinsman created works "High Street Broadway" and "Pershore Abbey," now in the Archives Department of the Eastern Townships Resource Centre in Sherbrooke, Quebec. Also in the collection is her "The Bells of Paradise," an essay describing her time in Pershore. In England, Kinsman's work was displayed at multiple solo exhibitions in both Pershore and Malvern as well as in a group exhibition at the Royal Watercolour Society and Royal Academy of Graphic Artists in London. Kinsman's time in Broadway influenced her publication of "Broadway Sketchbook," a compilation of scenes from her time there, including depictions of village people whom she "mocked a little." Her works created in Broadway, specifically one of her old stone house, show what Franck Les Tyrs called Kinsman's "magical ability to capture light and mood."

=== Lennoxville, Quebec ===
The last seventeen years of Kinsman's life were dedicated to studying and creating artworks, essays, and other publications in Lennoxville, Quebec. In the 1980s at the age of 71, Kinsman returned to Quebec, Canada from England. Settling in Lennoxville, Kinsman continued to study fine arts and additionally languages, music history and British history as a special undergraduate student. After a full career of creating art, Kinsman enrolled in a BA Fine Arts program at Bishop's University in Sherbrooke, Quebec. It is quoted that Kinsman was "sidetracked" into other subjects such as languages, history, and music. In the end, Kinsman graduated with a BA in liberal arts, accepting the degree in 1983.

The summer after her graduation, Kinsman travelled to Santiago de Compostela, following the famous pilgrimage route across Spain. Kinsman's experiences from that trip were later recounted in a lecture "The Way to Compostela" later that same year at Bishop's University, as well as in French at the Musée des Beaux-Arts in Sherbrooke.

In 1983, Kinsman reapplied to Bishop's University as a special undergraduate, now for the second time, taking history, classics, and language courses. Kinsman also began a masters of English from McGill University. Kinsman's thesis was centred around medieval studies, particularly about the canon Sumer is icumen in, "as she wished to prove, by John of Fornsett." Kinsman was awarded the MA from McGill University in 1987 at the age of 78. Afterwards, Kinsman continued studies at Bishop's University, leading to a second BA in classics, achieved in 1989. At the same ceremony, Kinsman was awarded an honorary doctorate by Bishop's University (DCL Honoris Causa). Kinsman's final class was taken in 1996 at the age of 86. Through these years of Kinsman's studies, "her artistic career continued with great vigour," as she travelled to Europe during the summers, bringing back new works.

== Artistic Output ==
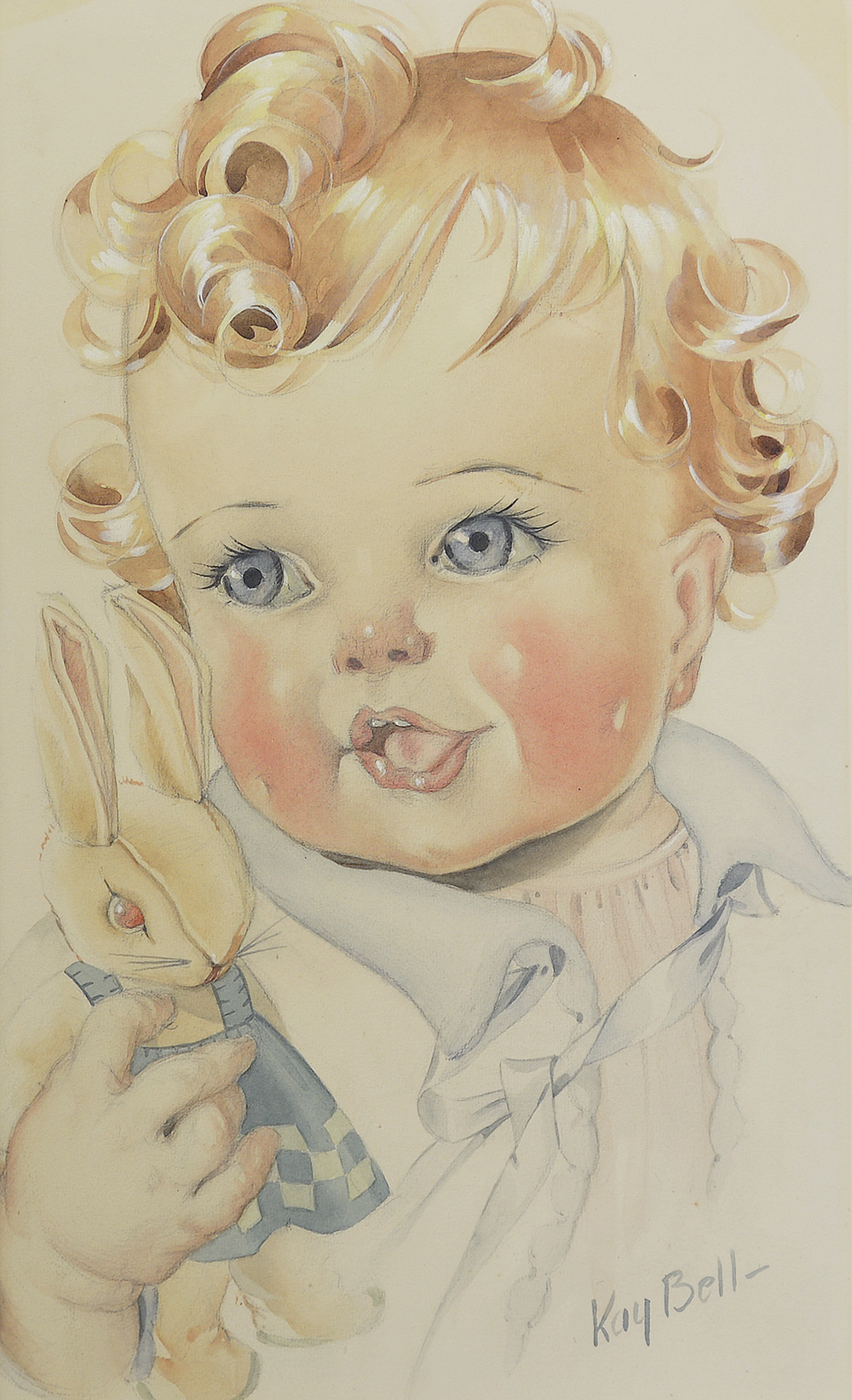
Watercolour on paper depicting a young child with large expressive features holding a stuffed toy rabbit, painted by Kay Bell (Katherine Bell Kinsman).

Kinsman spent her lifetime working with watercolour, pen, and ink. The subject matter of many of her works, especially later in her life, were scenes of streets, buildings, nature, and people caught in moments of daily life. Kinsman's works provided a quick glimpse but included detail such as words on a sign or a pigeon in a street. Kinsman's style differs from that of her first teacher, Amédée Ozenfant, whose style was primarily cubist. Kinsman's work is more comparable to those of her other mentors, Dr. Arthur Lismer and Anne Savage, both known for depicting scenes of nature.

Kinsman published three sketchbooks in her lifetime: Montreal Sketchbook (1967), Broadway Sketchbook (1974), and Lennox Sketchbook (1990). As part of her master's degree from McGill University, Kinsman published a work entitled Sing cuccu nu. Kinsman's work was displayed in numerous solo and group exhibitions in Quebec and in various locations in England. A full list of exhibitions are detailed below.

== Personal life and death ==
Kinsman was married to Ronald Desmond Lewis Kinsman in 1932. The two met in Paris while Kinsman studied fine art. From there, the couple moved to Switzerland for her husband's business, then to New York City, and finally to Montreal. She "loved her children." She had three children: Michael Jon (who died in 1986), Jocelyn, and Jeremy. After her husband's death in 1965, Kinsman travelled back to England, where she spent time creating art depicting scenes of daily life and quiet streets. Once back in Canada, Kinsman spent the rest of her life fulfilling her love of learning in (Lennoxville) Sherbrooke, Quebec at Bishop's University. At the age of 89, Kinsman died of Pneumonia in Lennoxville, Quebec.

== Legacy ==
Kinsman's works are currently located in various private collections around the world including the Rothchild Collection (Montreal), the R. Martindale Collection (Marbella, Spain), the Stratford-upon-Avon Gallery in England, and the Musée des beaux-arts de Sherbrooke, Sherbrooke, Quebec. After her death, drawings and materials used by Kinsman were donated to the Archives Department of the Eastern Townships Resource Centre, Sherbrooke, Quebec, including copies of each published sketchbook.

== Exhibitions ==
Her solo exhibitions include:

- Place Ville-Marie, Montreal, Quebec
- Mountain Playhouse, Montreal, Quebec
- Broadway, Gloucestershire, England
- Pershore Festival, Worcestershire, England
- Malvern Festival, Worcestershire, England
- Lennoxville Festival, Lennoxville, Quebec
- Lennoxville Gallery, Lennoxville, Quebec
- Musée Beaulne, Coaticook, Quebec
- The Sherbrooke Trust, Sherbrooke, Quebec
- La Société d-histoire des Cantons de l’Est, Howardene, Sherbrooke, Quebec
- Musée des Beaux Arts, Sherbrooke, Quebec
- Bishop's University Art Gallery, Sherbrooke, Quebec

Her group exhibitions include:

- Mall Galleries, London, England
- Royal Water Colour Society, London, England
- "Women in Art", London, England
- "Britain in Water Colour", London, England
- Royal Society of Graphic Artists, London, England
- Spring Salon, Art Association, Montreal, Quebec
- Royal Canadian Academy, Ottawa, Ontario
- Musée des beaux-arts, Sherbrooke, Quebec
- Galerie Canard de bois, Sherbrooke, Quebec

== Bibliography ==
- Montreal Sketchbook (published for the Canadian Centennial in 1967),
- Broadway Sketchbook (1974),
- Lennox Sketchbook (1990).
