= Llanddulas Lifeboat Station =

Former RNLI lifeboat station in Conwy County Borough, Wales

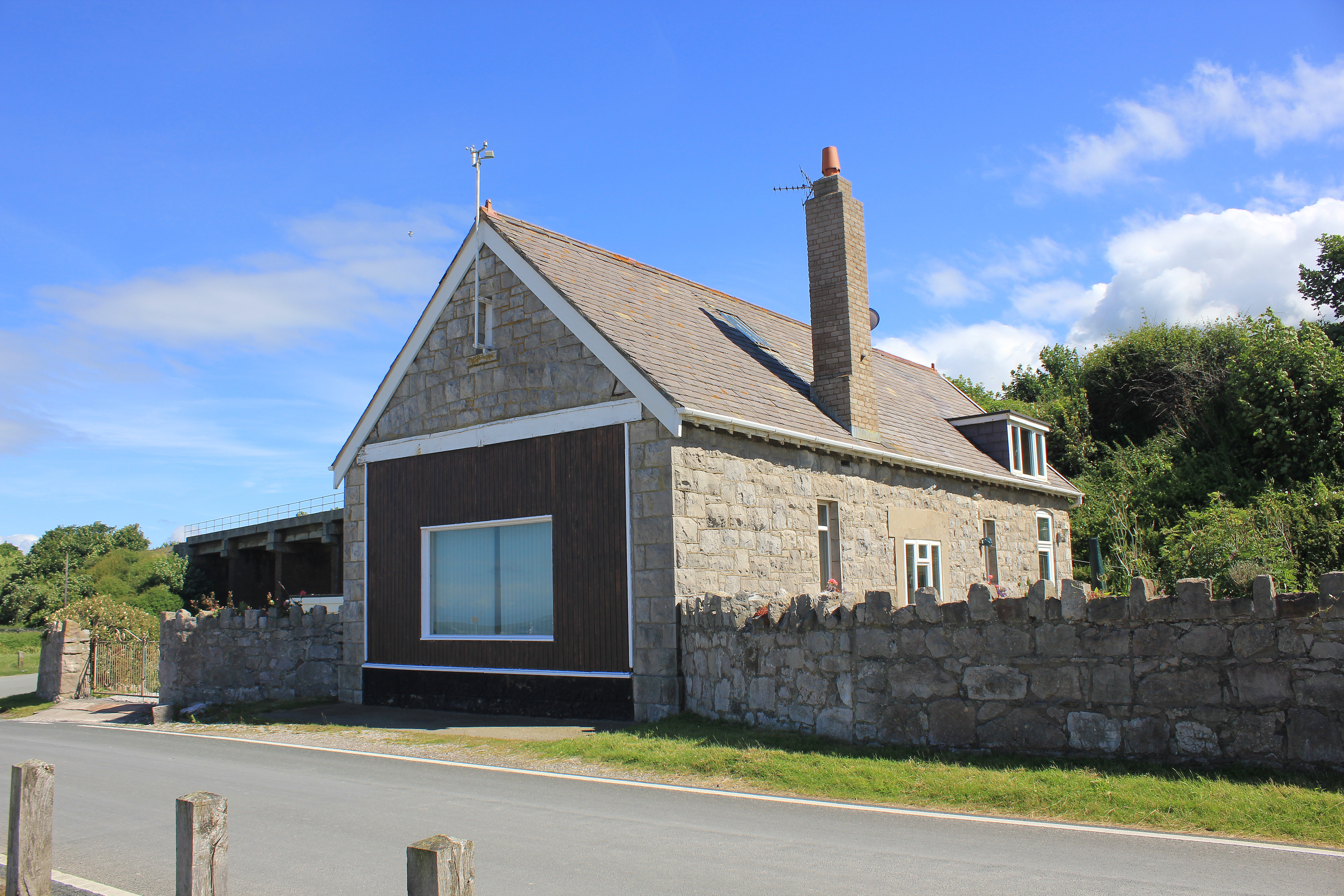
- 1869 Llanddulas Lifeboat House

- Llanddulas, Conwy

General information
- Status: Closed
- Type: RNLI Lifeboat Station
- Location: Old Lifeboat House, Wern Road, Llanddulas, Conwy, LL22 8HG, Wales
- Coordinates: 53°17′35.2″N 3°38′30.9″W
- Opened: 1869
- Closed: 1932

Llanddulas Lifeboat Station was located on the shore side of the railway station, on Wern Road in Llanddulas, a village situated between Colwyn Bay and Rhyl, in Conwy, on the coast of North Wales.

A lifeboat was first stationed at Llanddulas by the Royal National Lifeboat Institution (RNLI) in 1869.

The station was closed on 1 Dec 1932, when a motor-powered lifeboat was due to be placed at Llandudno.

== History ==
The loss of the vessel Guardian Angel off Abergele on 2 December 1867, and of eight of the 15 crew, highlighted that wrecks in the area could not be reached by the Rhyl lifeboat without much delay. The local branch of the RNLI at Rhyl requested of the Institution, that an additional lifeboat be placed at Abergele, under the management of the Rhyl station, which was agreed.

The Henry Nixson No.2, a 33-foot self-righting 'Pulling and Sailing' (P&S) lifeboat, one with sails and (10) oars, was dispatched to Abergele on the 8 January 1868, along with its transporting carriage. The cost of the station was defrayed from a sum of £450-10s received by the Institution via the Manchester branch of the RNLI, from the late Mr Henry Nixson of Manchester, who had previously funded the lifeboat Henry Nixson stationed at Maryport. However, the arrival coincided with the departure of the Rhyl lifeboat for repairs, and the new Abergele lifeboat was stationed temporarily at Rhyl.

Whilst the Rhyl lifeboat was away, the decision about placing a boat Abergele was reconsidered, and it was decided that a site 2 miles (3.2 km) further west at Llanddulas was preferred, "chosen as the most eligible spot, the people of the neighbourhood being also most anxious to have the boat, and there being an excellent site available for a life-boat house, a good beach for launching, and a competent crew to work the boat."

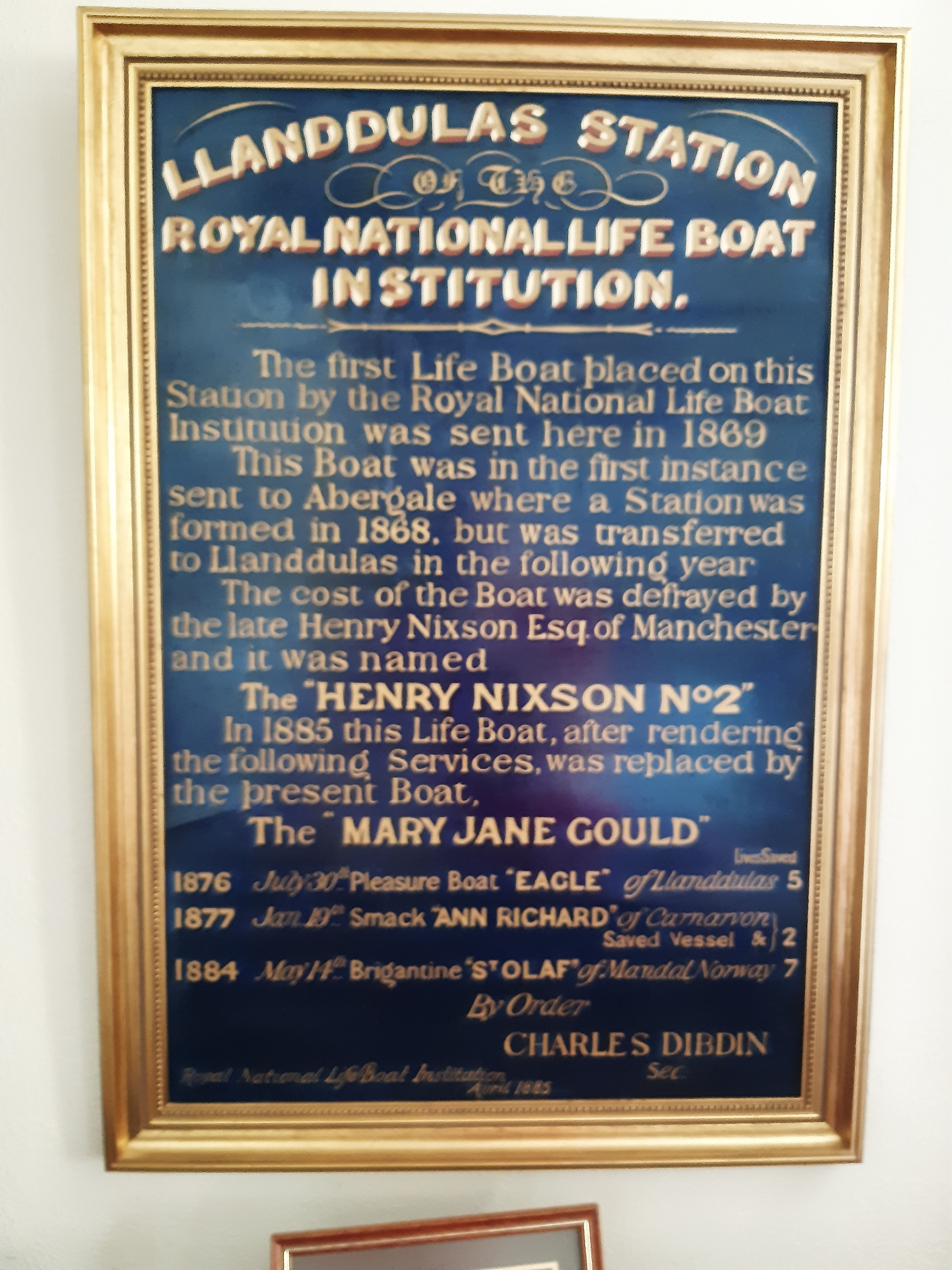
Llanddulas RNLI Lifeboat Service Board (one)

On 25 September 1869, following the return of the Rhyl lifeboat, now named Morgan, the Henry Nixson No.2 was take in procession 7 miles (11 km) along the coast to Llanddulas, where Mr. Robert Bamford-Hesketh of Gwrych Castle had provided a site for a boathouse, and given £150 for its construction. After a short service given by Rev. John Davies, BA, Vicar of Llanddulas, and also Honorary Secretary to the Llanddulas Branch of the RNLI, the lifeboat was launched on demonstration. Robert Williams was appointed Coxswain, and Richard Williams was Second Coxswain, both men from H.M. Coastguard, with the crew made up from local quarry workers.

Having been called upon twice while temporarily at Rhyl, it would be nearly seven years before the Llanddulas lifeboat was again required. At 14:00 on 30 July 1876, the vessel Eagle of Llandudno was seen in distress. The Henry Nixson No.2 was launched as quickly as possible, and arrived with the vessel at 15:00, just in time to rescue the crew of five.

On 14 May 1884, on her last service, the lifeboat was launched to the aid of the brigantine St. Olaf of Norway, on passage to Connah's Quay, which had capsized in Colwyn Bay and drifted ashore. Seven people were rescued from the wreck.

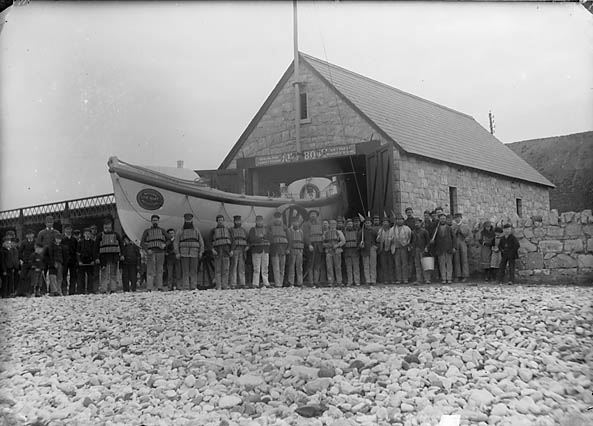
Mary Jane Gould (ON 69) at Llanddulas

Shortly after a new lifeboat was placed at Llanddulas, Mary Jane Gould (ON 69), Second Coxswain Richard Roberts would be awarded the RNLI Silver Medal in 1886, for his actions without the lifeboat. With a rope tied around him, he waded out in the breaking surf to the Dido, which had been driven ashore at Llanddulas, and managed to get a line to the men on the boat, who were then hauled ashore.

In a fierce storm, the schooner Ocean Queen was driven on to the rocks at Penmaen Head on 7 November 1890. Attempts to launch the lifeboat failed due to the conditions. A handful of men from the local quarry, including usual lifeboat crew member John Roberts, took a small boat near to the wreck, and attempted multiple times to launch. On the eighth attempt, they were successful, and rescued the 4 crew off the Ocean Queen. For their efforts, they were awarded RNLI silver medals. Two of the crew would later become coxswain of the Llanddulas lifeboat.

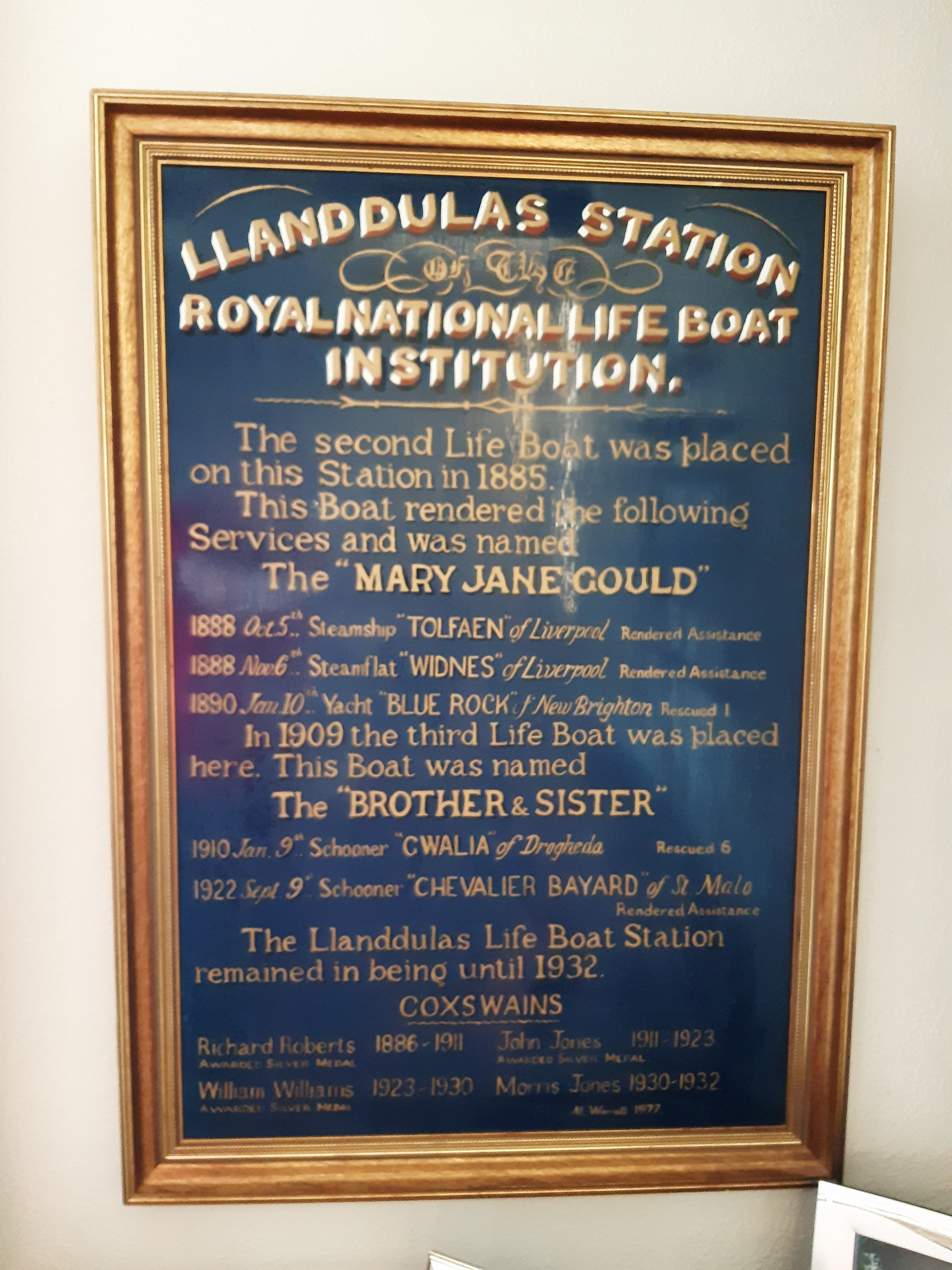
Llanddulas RNLI Lifeboat Service Board (two)

In 1909, the 36-foot Liverpool-class non-self-righting lifeboat Brother and Sister (ON 598) was placed on station. The boathouse had to be extended to accommodate the boat. One year later, just before noon on Sunday 9 January 1910, the schooner Gwalia of Drogheda, bound for Liverpool, was seen in distress. The crew were summoned from their various places of worship, and the lifeboat Brother and Sister was launched promptly into a westerly gale. The crew of six were rescued, before the vessel stranded.

In the next 22 years on station, the lifeboat would be launched just 3 times. Finally, with less sailing vessels at sea, and with the imminent introduction of a motor-lifeboat at Llandudno (in 1933), the days were numbered for the station. Llanddulas Lifeboat Station was closed on 1 December 1932.

The Llanddulas lifeboats had been launched just 15 times in 63 years, but 21 lives had been saved. The Brother and Sister (ON 598) was sold in 1932, but no further records are available. The boathouse is still standing, and is a private residence.

== Coxswains ==
- Lifeboat coxswains appointed at Llanddulas.

Robert Williams, 1869–1882
John Williams, 1882–1886
Richard Roberts, 1886–1911
John Jones, 1911–1923
William Williams, 1923–1930
Morris Jones, 1930–1932

== Station honours ==
The following are awards made at Llanddulas.

- RNLI Silver Medal

Richard Roberts, Second Coxswain – 1886

John Jones, Quarryman – 1890
David Roberts, Mason – 1890
John Roberts, Quarryman – 1890
Hugh Williams, Labourer – 1890
William Williams, Quarryman – 1890
William Williams, Grocer – 1890

== Llanddulas lifeboats ==
=== Pulling and Sailing lifeboats ===
ON (Note: ON is the RNLI's Official Number of the boat.)	Name	Built	On station	Class	Comments
Pre-490	Henry Nixson No.2	1867	1869–1885	33-foot Peake Self-righting (P&S)	(Note: 33-foot x 8-foot 7in (10-oared) Peake-class self-righting (P&S) lifeboat, legacy of Mr H. Nixson of Manchester, built by Forrestt of Limehouse, London, costing £292.); Previously at Rhyl.
69	Mary Jane Gould	1885	1885–1909	34-foot Self-righting (P&S)	(Note: 34-foot x 8-foot 3in (10-oared) Self-righting (P&S) lifeboat, legacy of Mrs J. Gould of Manchester, built by Forrestt of Limehouse, London, costing £355.)
598	Brother and Sister	1909	1909–1932	36-foot Liverpool (P&S)	(Note: 36-foot x 9-foot (12-oared) Liverpool-class non-self-righting (P&S) lifeboat, legacy of Miss L. B. Courtney of Brompton Square, built by Thames Ironworks, of Blackwall, London, costing £939.)

Pre ON numbers are unofficial numbers used by the Lifeboat Enthusiast Society to reference early lifeboats not included on the official RNLI list.

== See also ==
- List of RNLI stations
- List of former RNLI stations
- Royal National Lifeboat Institution lifeboats
