= Giles Collier =

English divine (1622–1678)

Giles Collier (1622–1678), was an English divine.

Collier was the son of Giles Collier of Pershore, Worcestershire, in which county he was born in 1622. In Lent term 1637 he became either a battler or a servitor at New Inn Hall, Oxford, taking the degrees of B.A. and M.A. in 1641 and 1648 respectively. When he left the university he became a presbyterian, subscribing in 1648 to the covenant, and was afterwards presented to the livings of Blockley and Evesham in Warwickshire.

In 1654 he was made assistant to the commissioners acting within that county for the ejection of 'scandalous, ignorant, and insufficient ministers and schoolmasters,' but on the Restoration he retained his livings by complying with the Act of Uniformity, to the disappointment of the neighbouring loyalists, who disliked his meddlesome and somewhat vindictive nature. He died at Blockley in July 1678, and was buried there.

His works are:

- Vindiciæ Thesium de Sabato, or a Vindication of certain passages in a sermon on the Morality of the Sabbath, from the exceptions to which they were subjected by Edw. Fisher, esq., in his book called "A Christian Caveat," &c.
- Appendix wherein is briefly examined the bold assertion of Edw. Fisher, esq., viz. there is an equal antiquity for the observance of the 25 Dec. as for the Lord's Day, 1653.
- Answer to Fifteen Questions lately published by Edward Fisher, esq., and the suggestions therein delivered against suspended ignorant and scandalous persons from the Lord's Supper, &c.
