= Tubular-class lifeboat =

Tubular pulling and sailing lifeboats

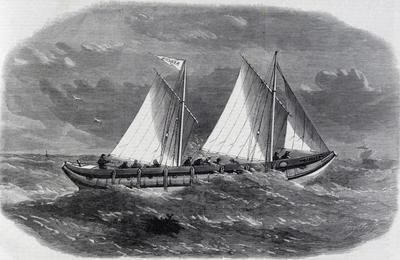
- New Brighton Tubular Lifeboat, 1863

Class overview
- Builders: Russell & Oswald; William Lees of Manchester; J. Hamilton Jnr. of Liverpool; Naval Construction and Armament Co. of Barrow-in-Furness; Mechan of Glasgow; Thames Ironworks of Blackwall, London
- Operators: Royal National Lifeboat Institution
- Built: 1850–1896
- In service: 1850–1939
- Completed: 10
- Retired: 10

General characteristics
- Type: Pulling and sailing lifeboats
- Length: 32 ft 0 in (9.75 m) to 45 ft 0 in (13.72 m)
- Beam: 8 ft 4 in (2.54 m) to 12 ft 6 in (3.81 m)
- Propulsion: Oars and Sails
- Crew: 10–14

Tubular lifeboats were effectively a type of catamaran, or raft, with a flat deck mounted between two buoyant tubes. The decks of the boats were approximately 11 inches (280 mm) above the water. The first version was constructed by Russel & Oswald, and operated at Douglas lifeboat station on the Isle of Man between 1850 and 1852. The later lifeboat was the design of Messrs. Richardson, of Bala, Merionethshire. The boats were usually 12, 14 or 16-oared, with sails available for suitable conditions.

A tubular lifeboat was first placed in service at Rhyl in 1856 by the Royal National Lifeboat Institution (RNLI). Even though just six more of this type were constructed for the Institution, tubular lifeboats were in service with the RNLI for a combined period of 83 years. They operated primarily at just two stations, Rhyl in north Wales and New Brighton on the Wirral Peninsula

== Design ==
The vessel was constructed from two iron cylinders, each approximately 40 ft (12 m) in length and 2 ft 6 in (0.76 m) in diameter, divided into watertight compartments. The iron plating of the cylinders was 1/12 in (2.1 mm) thick, and each compartment had openings at the top to allow for the removal of any water ingress via pumping. The four end compartments were fitted with airtight bladders, while the two central compartments were filled with cork shavings.

The ends of the cylinders were "tapered, curved, and turned inward to converge at a raised point at both the bow and stern". The cylinders were braced together, resulting in an overall width of 8 ft (2.4 m). Above, a platform was mounted measuring 30 ft (9.1 m) in length and 6 ft 8 in (2.03 m) in width.

The vessel was classified as a "Pulling and Sailing" (P&S) lifeboat, typically equipped with 12 to 16 oars, steered by a rudder, and rigged with two lug sails, a jib, and topsails for use in favourable weather conditions. Its buoyancy allowed it to carry up to 80 men, and it remained stable even if all occupants were positioned on one side.

== History ==
The primary Tubular lifeboat was designed by Henry Richardson and his son Henry Thomas Richardson, both of Aber Hirnant, Bala, in North Wales. Their first vessel, Challenger, was navigated from Liverpool, around Land's End, finally reaching its destination of Ramsgate, having successfully endured rough weather near St Davids and Padstow. It was sold for use in Portugal.

Following the loss of six Rhyl lifeboat men when their lifeboat capsized in January 1853, all confidence in their 'Beeching' constructed lifeboat was lost. At the request of the Rhyl lifeboat committee, a tubular lifeboat was commissioned by the RNLI, with a view to evaluating its performance. In February 1856, the new 32-foot tubular lifeboat, constructed by William Lees of Manchester, was launched, and towed from Manchester to Rhyl.

When Henry T. Richardson, then of Brynhrfryd, Pwllheli, died on 21 November 1878, he bequeathed to the RNLI, on the death of his wife, the sum of £10,000, to include the provision of two tubular lifeboats, their ongoing maintenance, and the opening of a lifeboat station at Pwllheli.

When the time came, in 1891, a lifeboat station was established at Pwllheli. A 35-foot 7in tubular lifeboat, Caroline Richardson (ON 287), was provided, but it was not liked by the crew. It served just one year at Pwllheli, being launched just once. In fact, such was the dislike for this type of boat that the RNLI went to court to gain permission to reallocate the funds to standard type lifeboats, which was granted. Caroline Richardson (ON 287) was transferred to Rhyl.

In the end, just two RNLI stations would find favour in the tubular lifeboat, Rhyl and New Brighton. A tubular lifeboat would serve at Rhyl from 1856 to 1939, a period of 83 years, with the last boat, Caroline Richardson (ON 398), on station for 42 years.

== Tubular lifeboats ==
ON (Note: ON is the RNLI's Official Number of the boat.)	Name	Built	In service	Station	Comments
–	Russell & Oswald Life Raft	1850	1850–1852	Douglas	(Note: 30 ft 0 in (9.14 m) x 8 ft 6 in (2.59 m) (10-oared) (P&S) lifeboat, built by Russell & Oswald.); Built of Iron.
–	Challenger	1851	1852–????	Oporto, Portugal	(Note: 40 ft 0 in (12.19 m) x 8 ft 0 in (2.44 m) (14-oared) (P&S) lifeboat, built by William Lees of Manchester, costing £130.); Prototype vessel, sold for service in Oporto Portugal.
70	Unnamed	1856	1856–1867	Rhyl	(Note: 32 ft 0 in (9.75 m) x 8 ft 4 in (2.54 m) (12-oared) (P&S) lifeboat, provided from RNLI funds, built by William Lees of Manchester, costing £200.); Renamed Morgan in 1867.
70	Morgan	1856	1867–1893	Rhyl	(Note: Legacy of Mrs Morgan of Cheltenham); Sent away for repairs in 1868, returned in 1869.
Pre-387	Rescue	1862	1863–1866	New Brighton	(Note: 42 ft 0 in (12.80 m) x 10 ft 0 in (3.05 m) (14-oared) (P&S) lifeboat, funded by the RNLI, built by J. Hamilton Jr. of Liverpool, costing £230.); Withdrawn from service in 1866, completely rebuilt, returned as Willie & Arthur.
Pre-387	Willie & Arthur	1862	1867–1876	New Brighton	(Note: 40 ft 3 in (12.27 m) x 11 ft 0 in (3.35 m) (14-oared) (P&S) lifeboat, legacy of Mr J. Leather of Liverpool.)
–	No. 1	1870	1870–1894	Liverpool	(Note: 43 ft 6 in (13.26 m) x 11 ft 6 in (3.51 m) (16-oared) (P&S) lifeboat, built by William Lees of Manchester, costing £130.); Operated by Mersey Docks and Harbour Company.
71	Willie & Arthur	1876	1876–1890	New Brighton No.1	(Note: 45 ft 0 in (13.72 m) x 11 ft 0 in (3.35 m) (14-oared) (P&S) lifeboat, gift of Mr J. Leather of Liverpool, built by J. Hamilton, Jnr, of Liverpool, costing £562-10s-0d.); Condemned and sold, 1890.
Pre-625	Stuart Hay	1878	1878–1888	New Brighton No.2	(Note: 40 ft 0 in (12.19 m) x 8 ft 11 in (2.72 m) (12-oared) (P&S) lifeboat, gift of J. Hay & Co. of Liverpool, built by J. Hamilton, Jnr, of Liverpool, costing £500.); Broken up in 1888
221	Henry Richardson	1888	1888–1890	New Brighton No.2	(Note: 43 ft 0 in (13.11 m) x 12 ft 6 in (3.81 m) (14-oared) (P&S) lifeboat, legacy of Mr H. T. Richardson of Bala, built by the Naval Construction and Armament Co. of Barrow-in-Furness, costing £637.); Broken up in 1898.
221	Henry Richardson	1888	1890–1892	New Brighton	Broken up in 1898.
221	Henry Richardson	1888	1893–1898	New Brighton No.1	Broken up in 1898.
287	Caroline Richardson	1891	1891–1892	Pwllheli	(Note: 35 ft 7 in (10.85 m) x 10 ft 0 in (3.05 m) (14-oared) (P&S) lifeboat, legacy of Mr H. T. Richardson of Bala, built by Mechan of Glasgow, costing £633.); Broken up in 1899.
287	Caroline Richardson	1891	1892–1897	Rhyl	Broken up in 1899.
287	Caroline Richardson	1891	1897–1899	Relief fleet	Broken up in 1899.
398	Caroline Richardson	1896	1897–1939	Rhyl	(Note: 34 ft 0 in (10.36 m) x 8 ft 10 in (2.69 m) (12-oared) (P&S) lifeboat, legacy of Mr H. T. Richardson of Bala, built by Thames Ironworks of Blackwall, London, costing £548.); Scrapped in 1952.

Pre ON numbers are unofficial numbers used by the Lifeboat Enthusiasts' Society to reference early lifeboats not included on the official RNLI list.

== See also ==
- List of RNLI stations
- List of former RNLI stations
- Royal National Lifeboat Institution lifeboats
