= Alfred Hurley =

Alfred Vincent Hurley, CBE, TD, MA (12 January 1896 – 24 February 1986) was Archdeacon of Dudley from 1951 until 1968.

Hurley was born in Caversham educated at Queen Mary's School for Boys, Basingstoke and Keble College, Oxford; and ordained in 1911. After wartime service with the Artists Rifles and the Royal Flying Corps he was ordained in 1922 and began his ecclesiastical career with a curacy in Armley. He was Chaplain at HM Prison Leeds from 1923 to 1924; and of Portland Borstal in 1924. He became Rector of Portland in 1931; and Rural Dean of Weymouth in 1937. In 1939 he became a Canon and Prebendary of Salisbury Cathedral in 1939. During World War II he was a Chaplain to the Forces, serving with the 4th Dorsets, 1939; the 42nd East Lancs Division and the Eighth Army, where he was Mentioned in Despatches. From 1945 to 1946 he was Chaplain General to the South East Asia Allied Land Forces. He was Rector of Oldswinford from 1948 to 1964; an Honorary Canon of Worcester Cathedral from 1951 to 1968, and also Examining Chaplain to the Bishop of Worcester for much of that period.

Church of England titles
Preceded by Arthur Shepherd	Archdeacon of Dudley; 1951–1968	Succeeded by Christopher Campling
