= Arthur Shepherd (priest) =

British archdeacon (1885–1968)

Arthur Pearce Shepherd, DD (31 December 1885 – 27 February 1968) was Archdeacon of Dudley from 1934 until 1951.

Shepherd was educated at Cardiff High School and Jesus College, Oxford; and ordained in 1911. After a curacy at All Saints, Northampton he was Assistant Secretary for Young People's Work at the Church Mission Society. Later he held incumbencies in Northampton, St James the Greater, Leicester and Dudley. He was a Canon Residentiary of Worcester Cathedral from 1945 to 1965; and Proctor in Convocation for the Diocese of Worcester from 1951 until 1964.

In 1954, Shepherd authored a biography of Rudolf Steiner.

== Writings ==
- Sin, Suffering and God. 1931
- The Eternity of Time. 1941
- Marriage Was Made for Man: A Study of the Problem of Marriage and Divorce in Relation to the Church of England. 1948
- A Scientist of the Invisible: An Introduction to the Life and Work of Rudolf Steiner. Hodder & Stoughton, London, 1954

Church of England titles
Preceded by Sydney James	Archdeacon of Dudley; 1934–1951	Succeeded by Alfred Hurley
