= Pershore =

Town in Worcestershire, England

Coordinates: 52.114°N 2.080°W

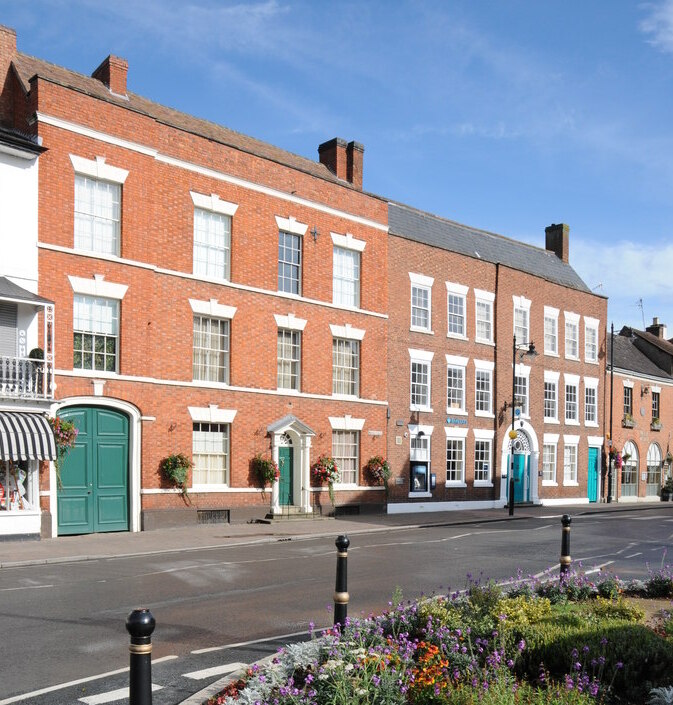
- Pershore High Street

- Location within Worcestershire
- Population: 8,406 (2021 Census)
- OS grid reference: SO945455
  - London: 104.5 miles (168.2 km)
- Civil parish: Pershore
- District: Wychavon
- Shire county: Worcestershire
- Region: West Midlands
- Country: England
- Sovereign state: United Kingdom
- Post town: PERSHORE
- Postcode district: WR10
- Dialling code: 01386
- Police: West Mercia
- Fire: Hereford and Worcester
- Ambulance: West Midlands
- UK Parliament: West Worcestershire
- Website: www.visitpershore.co.uk

Pershore (/ˈpɜːrʃɔːr/) is a market town and civil parish in the Wychavon district, in Worcestershire, England. It lies on the banks of the river Avon and in the Vale of Evesham, 6 miles (10 km) west of Evesham and 10 miles (16 km) east of Worcester. At the 2011 census, the population was 7,125. The town is best known for Pershore Abbey.

== History ==
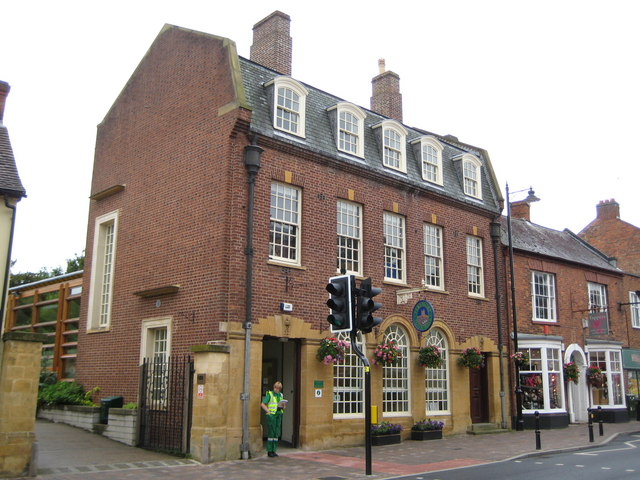
Pershore Town Hall

The name Pershore derives from the Old English perscōra meaning 'osier shore/slope' referring to its position between the Avon and a ridge.

The town contains examples of Georgian architecture. In 1964, the Council for British Archaeology included Pershore in its list of 51 British Gem Towns worthy of special consideration for historic preservation, and it has been listed as an outstanding conservation area. Parts of Pershore Abbey, which stand in an expanse of public grassland close to the centre of the town, date from the 11th century. The current structure is far smaller than the original building, which was plundered during the reign of Henry VIII at the Dissolution; the original nave was destroyed and the north transept later collapsed. The present nave occupies the western part of what would originally have been the choir. Pershore Town Hall, which was originally built as the local post office, was completed in 1932.

== Education ==
Schools in Pershore follow the three-tier education system that is practised in parts of the Worcestershire County Council area: first school (ages 5–9), middle school (9–12) and high school (11–18).

Abbey Park First School and Abbey Park Middle School are on Abbey Road; they are both situated on the same road. Pershore High School has a sixth form, with all-weather sports pitches and sports hall; it is on Station Road, on the outskirts of the town, bordering Pinvin.

Holy Redeemer Roman Catholic primary school, situated on Priest Lane beside Holy Redeemer, Pershore's only Catholic church, stands outside the three-tier model. It is a primary school (ages 5–11), which acts as a feeder school to Blessed Edward Oldcorne Catholic College in Worcester.

Pershore College, a school of horticulture and other land-based activities, became a campus for Warwickshire College (now WCG) following a merger in 2007.

== Pershore Old Bridge ==
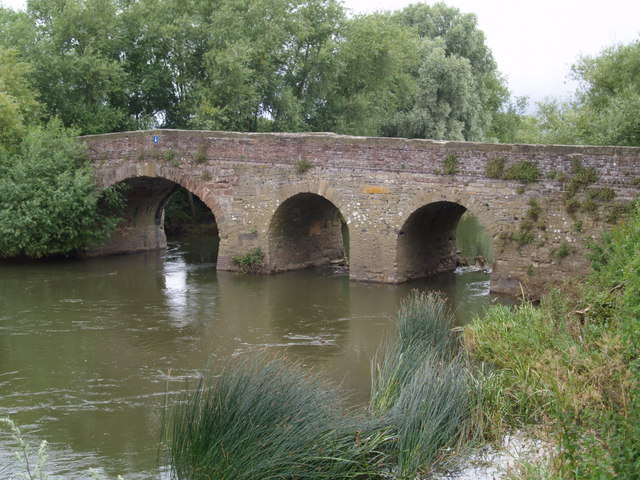
The Old Bridge

About 0.5 miles (0.8 km) outside the town is Pershore Old Bridge over the Avon. A bridge was originally built on the site in the 15th century; it was remodelled in the 17th century, after damage in the English Civil War, and again in the 18th century. It is a Grade II* listed structure.

== Transport ==
The town lies near the A44, approximately midway between Worcester and Evesham. The nearest motorways are the M5 and M50.

Pershore railway station is located in the village of Pinvin and lies on the Cotswold Line. Great Western Railway operates generally hourly services south-eastwards to Evesham, Oxford, Reading and London Paddington, and westwards to Worcester Shrub Hill, with less frequent extensions to Great Malvern and Hereford.

Stagecoach Midlands, First Worcester and LMS Travel operate bus services in the area, linking the town with Evesham, Stratford-upon-Avon and Worcester.

== Climate ==
Like much of the British Isles, Pershore has a temperate maritime climate. Maximums range from 7.9 °C (46.2 °F) in January to 22.6 °C (72.7 °F) in July and minimums from 1.5 °C (34.7 °F) in February to 12.2 °C (54.0 °F) in July. The January record high strangely occurred when it was dark; on 9 January 2015, temperatures rose to 16.1 °C (61.0 °F). On 12 December 1981 the lowest reading of −22.0 °C (−7.6 °F) was recorded. The warmest temperature ever recorded was 38.0 °C (100.4 °F) on 13 August 2026. On 31 March 2021, Pershore recorded its warmest March day on record, beating the previous record set the day before. On 7 September 2021, Pershore recorded its hottest September day on record, last set in 2005.

The lowest maximum temperature ever recorded was −9.1 °C (15.6 °F) on 14 January 1982. On 19 December 2010, Pershore recorded a maximum temperature of −8.2 °C (17.2 °F). This is the lowest maximum temperature on record for December in England. On the same day Pershore recorded a minimum temperature of −19.5 °C (−3.1 °F) (Note: One of the lowest December temperatures ever recorded here.) and at the same time exactly 5 years later it was 15.9 °C (60.6 °F) (one of the highest December temperatures ever recorded here). The maximum amount of precipitation in one day was 121 mm (4.8 in) on 20 July 2007 and the highest minimum temperature of 22.6 °C (72.7 °F) was recorded on 26 June 2026. The most sunshine in one day was 15.8 hours on 10 June 1969.

On 25 June 2026, Pershore recorded its warmest June night on record with 20.1 °C (68.2 °F), which was subsequently beaten the following night. On 26 May 2026, Pershore recorded its hottest May day on record, surpassing the previous day's record. On 25 June 2026, Pershore recorded its hottest June day on record, exceeding that set the day before.

Climate data for Pershore 35m amsl (1991–2020) (extremes 1957–present)
| Month | Jan | Feb | Mar | Apr | May | Jun | Jul | Aug | Sep | Oct | Nov | Dec | Year |
|---|---|---|---|---|---|---|---|---|---|---|---|---|---|
| Record high °C (°F) | 16.1 (61.0) | 18.8 (65.8) | 23.2 (73.8) | 26.0 (78.8) | 33.1 (91.6) | 34.5 (94.1) | 37.1 (98.8) | 38.0 (100.4) | 30.5 (86.9) | 28.4 (83.1) | 18.6 (65.5) | 16.3 (61.3) | 38.0 (100.4) |
| Mean maximum °C (°F) | 13.1 (55.6) | 13.7 (56.7) | 16.8 (62.2) | 20.5 (68.9) | 24.8 (76.6) | 27.7 (81.9) | 29.2 (84.6) | 28.3 (82.9) | 24.4 (75.9) | 20.1 (68.2) | 15.6 (60.1) | 13.7 (56.7) | 29.8 (85.6) |
| Mean daily maximum °C (°F) | 7.9 (46.2) | 8.7 (47.7) | 11.2 (52.2) | 14.2 (57.6) | 17.4 (63.3) | 20.4 (68.7) | 22.6 (72.7) | 22.1 (71.8) | 19.3 (66.7) | 15.0 (59.0) | 10.8 (51.4) | 8.2 (46.8) | 14.8 (58.6) |
| Daily mean °C (°F) | 4.8 (40.6) | 5.1 (41.2) | 7.0 (44.6) | 9.3 (48.7) | 12.4 (54.3) | 15.3 (59.5) | 17.4 (63.3) | 17.1 (62.8) | 14.6 (58.3) | 11.1 (52.0) | 7.4 (45.3) | 5.0 (41.0) | 10.6 (51.1) |
| Mean daily minimum °C (°F) | 1.7 (35.1) | 1.5 (34.7) | 2.7 (36.9) | 4.4 (39.9) | 7.3 (45.1) | 10.2 (50.4) | 12.2 (54.0) | 12.1 (53.8) | 9.8 (49.6) | 7.2 (45.0) | 4.0 (39.2) | 1.8 (35.2) | 6.3 (43.3) |
| Mean minimum °C (°F) | −5.5 (22.1) | −5.1 (22.8) | −3.6 (25.5) | −2.3 (27.9) | 0.3 (32.5) | 3.9 (39.0) | 6.7 (44.1) | 5.7 (42.3) | 2.4 (36.3) | 0.2 (32.4) | −3.2 (26.2) | −5.7 (21.7) | −8.1 (17.4) |
| Record low °C (°F) | −19.4 (−2.9) | −12.7 (9.1) | −10.1 (13.8) | −7.3 (18.9) | −3.2 (26.2) | −1.0 (30.2) | 2.7 (36.9) | 0.0 (32.0) | −1.0 (30.2) | −5.2 (22.6) | −10.5 (13.1) | −22.0 (−7.6) | −22.0 (−7.6) |
| Average precipitation mm (inches) | 56.1 (2.21) | 40.9 (1.61) | 39.5 (1.56) | 47.8 (1.88) | 54.0 (2.13) | 52.0 (2.05) | 55.1 (2.17) | 61.3 (2.41) | 52.3 (2.06) | 64.8 (2.55) | 64.4 (2.54) | 58.9 (2.32) | 647.0 (25.47) |
| Average precipitation days (≥ 1.0 mm) | 11.6 | 9.4 | 8.9 | 9.5 | 9.0 | 8.8 | 8.9 | 9.4 | 8.8 | 11.1 | 12.1 | 11.6 | 119.1 |
| Average relative humidity (%) | 85.6 | 82.6 | 77.3 | 73.7 | 72.2 | 71.0 | 71.5 | 73.7 | 77.0 | 79.3 | 83.4 | 86.9 | 77.9 |
| Mean monthly sunshine hours | 57.0 | 77.3 | 120.5 | 163.0 | 204.8 | 200.8 | 209.4 | 187.4 | 142.6 | 104.0 | 67.7 | 48.9 | 1,583.1 |
| Percentage possible sunshine | 21.9 | 27.3 | 32.7 | 38.8 | 42.1 | 40.1 | 41.7 | 41.5 | 37.7 | 31.7 | 25.6 | 20.2 | 33.4 |
Source 1: Met Office
Source 2: Tutiempo

== Culture ==
=== Plum Festival ===
The Pershore Plum Festival is held in August to celebrate the local tradition of growing plums, including the local varieties Pershore Purple, Pershore Yellow Egg Plum and Pershore Emblem. Activities include crowning the plum princess, a family fun run, plum-themed art exhibition and the Plum Fayre. There is also a classic car rally and nearby Worcester Racecourse revived The Land O'Plums Chase from 72 years ago. The festival won the Best Tourism Event and Festival in the Worcestershire Welcome Awards 2011.

=== Pershore Carnival ===
Every year on the Spring bank holiday, there is a carnival in Pershore with Floats and Stalls. The carnival features many rides and stalls such as hook a duck and bouncy castles. The carnival also features many local charity stalls, ranging from well known charities, such as the RNLI and Blue Cross, to more local charities, such as Evesham Adventure Playground. One of the main events of the carnival is an annual duck race held at the Rivers Centre where many rubber ducks are sent down the Avon.

== Media ==
Local news and television programmes are provided by BBC West Midlands and ITV Central. Television signals can be received from either the Sutton Coldfield or Lark Stoke TV transmitters.

Local radio stations are BBC Hereford and Worcester, Heart West Midlands, Radio Wyvern, Capital Mid-Counties, Greatest Hits Radio Herefordshire & Worcestershire, Hits Radio Herefordshire & Worcestershire, and Smooth West Midlands.

The town is served by the local newspaper, Evesham Journal, and its own community-based newspaper, The Pershore Times.

== Sport ==
The town is home to several sports clubs:

- Pershore Bowling Club is situated within Abbey Park; it was formed in 1928, following an invitation by the then Lord Abbott of Pershore to the tradesmen of the town to play bowls on the lawn at the monastery, which has long since been demolished. The Lord Abbott accepted an invitation to be the Club’s first president and continued to hold this office until 1936, when the monastery was closed and the monks moved to Nashdom Abbey in Buckinghamshire
- Pershore Town F.C. plays in the West Midlands (Regional) League Premier Division. It also has a women's team, Pershore Town Ladies, which plays in the Herefordshire and Worcestershire Women's County Football League
- Pershore Sports Club houses Pershore Cricket Club, which plays in the Birmingham and District League; it is situated at The Bottoms on Defford Road
- Pershore Rugby Club has a clubhouse and pitches by the river in nearby Wyre Piddle
- Pershore Tennis Club, based at the Horticultural College, has three indoor and five outdoor courts, with junior, social and adult sections
- Multiple BTCC title-winning team, Team Dynamics, is also based here
- Pershore Plum Plodders is an England Athletics-affiliated running club serving Pershore and the surrounding villages. The Abbey Park includes a bowls club, children's play area and skateboard park, consisting of a mini ramp and a street section
- Wychavon Kayak & Canoe Club is situated on the river at Pershore Riverside Centre.

== Notable people ==
Natives:

- Hugh Bennett (1862–1943), cricketer
- Claude Choules (1901–2011), was the world's last living veteran of both world wars and supercentenarian
- Giles Collier (1622–1678), Anglican divine
- George Dowty (1901–1975), inventor and businessman
- Florence Feek (1876-1940), suffragette
- Major Richard Charles Lowndes MC (1888 – 1960), and his father The Rev. William Dobson Lowndes, of Little Comberton Rectory, Pershore, and his mother Margaret Moody JP (1863 – 1943), who was a Pershore district councillor
- George Mason I (1629–1686), progenitor of the politically significant Mason family in America
- Janet Mary Salsbury (1881-1951), composer and organist.

Residents:

- Nigel Clark, singer with pop band Dodgy
- Michael Collie (1966–present), TV presenter, BBC Midlands Today
- Kay Kinsman, (1909-1998), visual artist and mature student at Bishop's University, Lennoxville, Quebec
- Maurice McCanlis (1906–1991), sportsman
- Charles Shadwell (1898–1979), musician
- Toyah Willcox, actor and singer, and her husband Robert Fripp of rock band King Crimson.
