= Florence Feek =

British suffragette and Post Office worker (1876–1940)

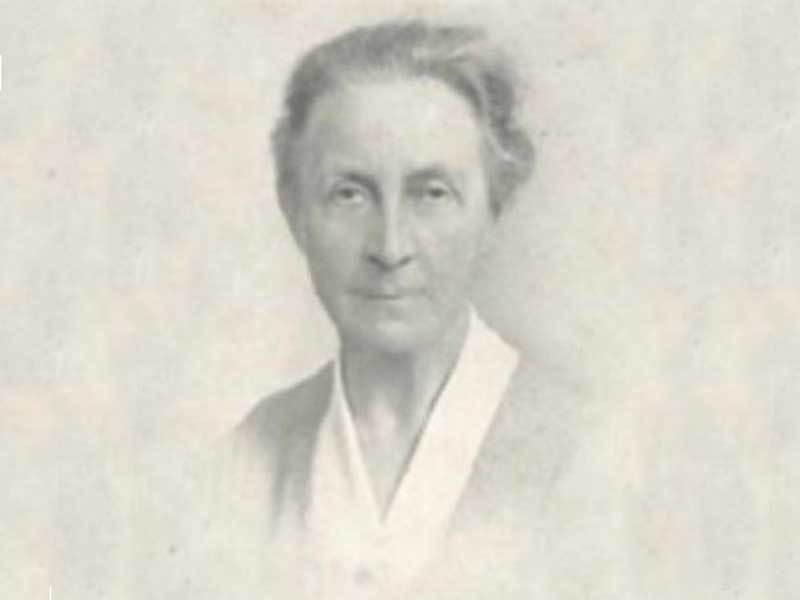
- Born: 26 December 1876; Pershore, Worcestershire, England
- Died: 15 September 1940 (aged 63); Whipps Cross University Hospital, London, England
- Employer: The Post Office
- Known for: employed by HMG whilst serving a prison sentence

Florence Eliza Feek (26 December 1876 – 15 September 1940) was a British suffragette and Post Office worker. She was sentenced to a month in prison for a suffragette demonstration. It was the prime minister who decided that she could keep her job after she served her sentence.

== Life ==
Feek was born in 1876 in Pershore, Worcestershire, she was the daughter of clergyman Julius and Marion Feek of Myrtle Cottage, Pershore.

Feek went to work in the Post Office in 1896, and she joined the Women's Social and Political Union after hearing speeches by leader Emmeline Pankhurst. She was a militant member of the WSPU, and she was arrested with eight other suffragettes as they tried to see the prime minister at 20 past four in the afternoon of the 31 March 1909. The police allowed them to try for 30 minutes to gain entry in front of a small crowd before arresting nine of them.

Feek was sentenced to a month in prison, which she managed to serve by taking her annual holiday. Her employers were unsure and debated whether she should be sacked. The Post Office was part of the civil service, and the question was escalated up the chain of command. Her terms of service stated that employees must "maintain a certain reserve in political matters, and not put themselves forward on one side or the other." The question was settled by the prime minister, who decided that they did not want to make her into a martyr for the suffragette cause. Feek joined in the WSPU party that was thrown in the honour of those who had been imprisoned.

Feek was given a warning, and, although it was reported that she did not take it seriously, she was warned that if there was any further trouble then she would lose her job. There was no more trouble. She retired eventually, and the Post Office noted that she had been a model employee.

Feek died in Whipps Cross University Hospital in London after her home in the County Hostel at 35 High Street, Plaistow was almost destroyed by a bomb on 15 September 1940. . Ten years later a list of the active suffragettes was compiled, and Feek was on that list.
