= Hugh Bennett (cricketer) =

English cricketer

Cricket information
- Batting: Right-handed
- Bowling: Right-arm slow

Career statistics
Competition	First-class
Matches	4
Runs scored	86
Batting average	12.28
100s/50s	0/0
Top score	41
Catches/stumpings	0/–
- Source: Cricinfo, 13 April 2023

Hugh Frederic Bennett (10 November 1862 – 26 July 1943) was an English cricketer, who played two first-class games for Worcestershire in 1901. He made 24 and 31* on his debut against Gloucestershire, but after scoring just 8 in the following game against Derbyshire he never played again.

He also played county cricket below first-class level for Shropshire in three matches between 1891 and 1897, while playing at club level for Oswestry.

He was born in Pirton, Pershore, Worcestershire; he died in the same county at Elmley Castle, Malvern, aged 80. He was educated at Bradfield College and Oxford University and became a Church of England clergyman.
