= Nikki Groarke =

British Anglican priest (born 1962)

Nicola Jane "Nikki" Groarke (born 2 June 1962) is a British Anglican priest. Since 2014, she has served as the Archdeacon of Dudley.

== Ordained ministry ==
She trained for ministry at Ridley Hall, Cambridge, and was ordained in 2000. She was a curate at Balham, South London and had been Vicar of St Stephen's Canonbury for five years. Groarke was licensed as the Archdeacon of Dudley at the beginning of January 2014 and was installed as a Canon of Worcester Cathedral at around the same time.

Groarke is an evangelical Anglican. She welcomes the Church of England's introduction of blessings for same-sex partnerships.

Church of England titles
Preceded by Fred Trethewey	Archdeacon of Dudley; 2014–present	Incumbent
