= New Brighton Lifeboat Station =

RNLI lifeboat station in Merseyside, England

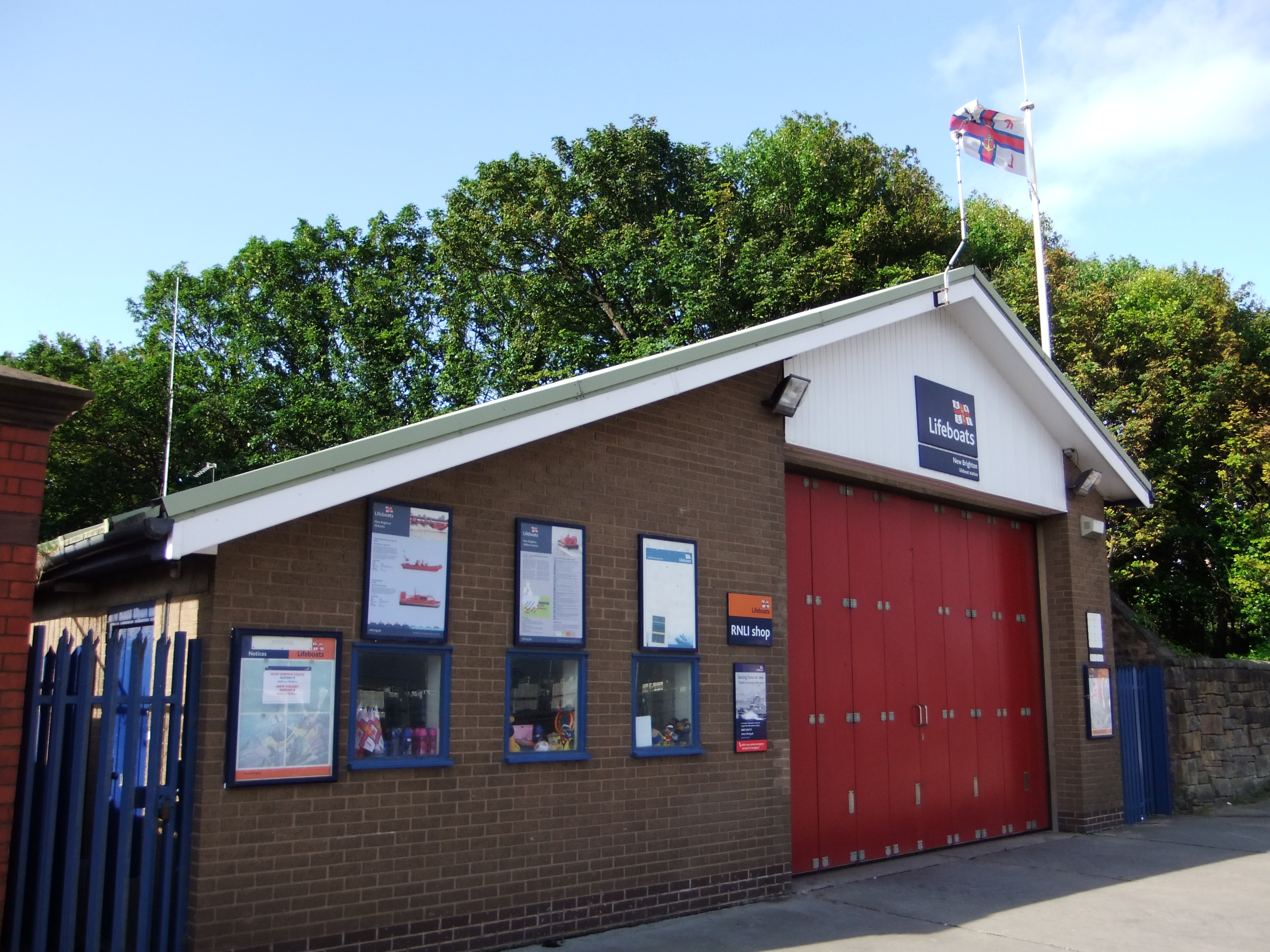
- New Brighton Lifeboat Station

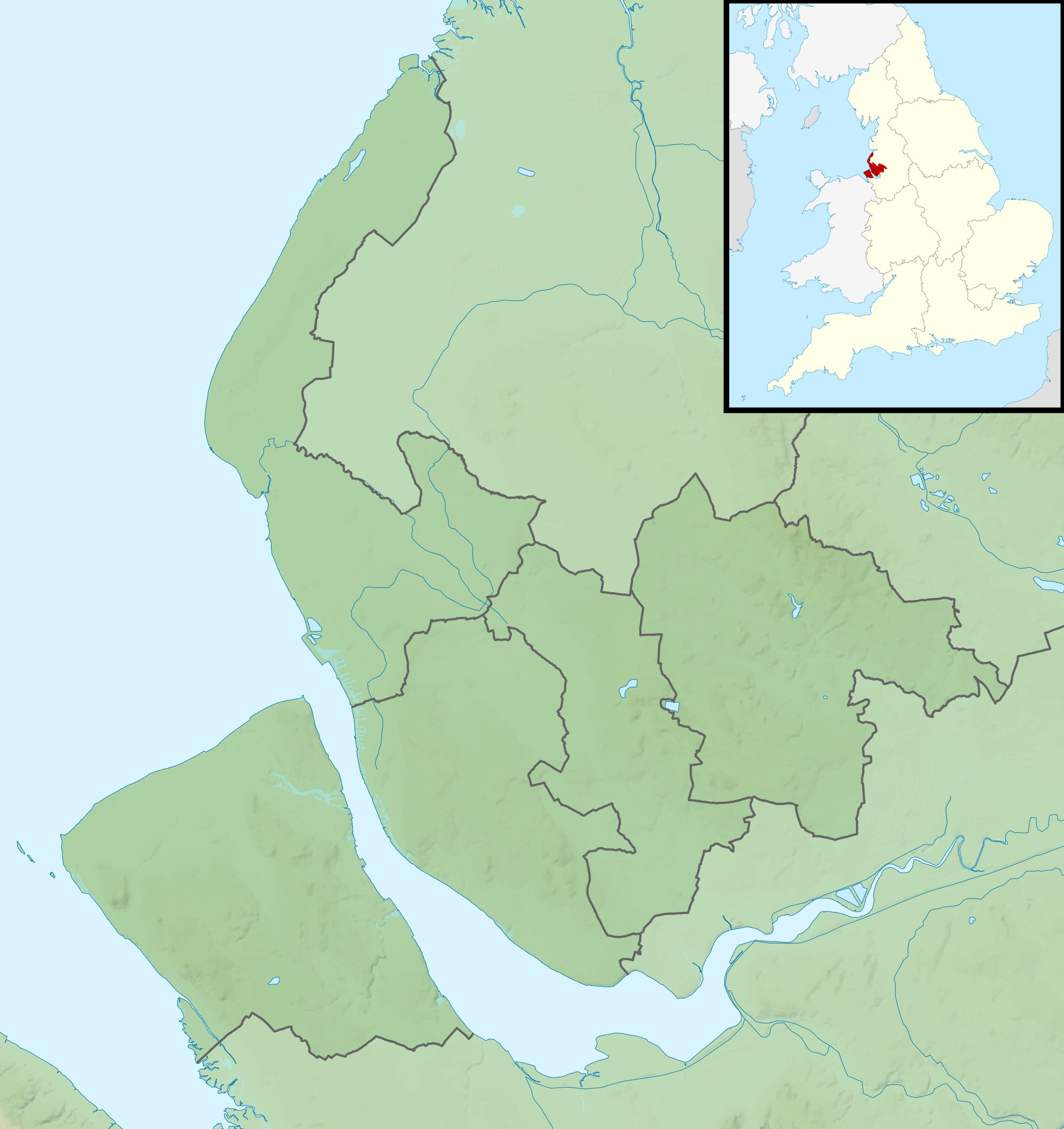
- Location within Merseyside

General information
- Type: RNLI Lifeboat Station
- Location: Kings Parade, New Brighton, Wirral, Merseyside, CH45 2ND, England
- Coordinates: 53°26′22.1″N 3°02′50.2″W
- Opened: 1827 Liverpool Dock Trustees (Magazines); 1863 RNLI (New Brighton}
- Owner: Royal National Lifeboat Institution

Website
- New Brighton RNLI Lifeboat Station

New Brighton Lifeboat Station is located on Kings Parade in New Brighton, a town on the Wirral Peninsula in Merseyside.

A lifeboat was first stationed at Magazines village by the Liverpool Dock Trustees in 1827. Management of the station was transferred to the Royal National Lifeboat Institution (RNLI) in 1863.

The station currently operates a B-class (Atlantic 85) Inshore lifeboat, the Charles Dibdin (Civil Service No.51) (B-837), on station since 2009.

== History ==
In the 18th Century, vessels arriving in the Port of Liverpool were required to first deposit their gunpowder in the Gunpowder magazine, which was located in a secluded area on the Wirral, across the River Mersey from Liverpool. Over time, Magazine Village developed, and it was here that the Liverpool Dock Trustees placed one of their lifeboats in 1827, with a boathouse being constructed in 1828. The location was ideally situated to cover the mouth of the river. A second boat was stationed there in 1839.

At a public meeting in 1862, it was discussed that a boat, located in the now increasingly populous area known as New Brighton, would be better positioned to effect a faster response into Liverpool Bay. The RNLI was approached, and agreed to provide a lifeboat station in New Brighton.

With the previous lifeboats usually towed to the scene of shipwreck by a steamer, it was decided to provide the most stable lifeboat suited to being towed. An unusual 42 ft 0 in (12.80 m) Tubular-class lifeboat costing £230, designed by the late H. Richardson, and constructed of the best Charcoal iron, was commissioned from J. Hamilton Jr., of the Windsor Ironworks, Liverpool, who gave up all profits on its manufacture.

On 24 January 1863, large crowds watched the lifeboat as she was drawn through the streets of Liverpool in grand procession, followed by the mayor and other dignitaries, men from the military and Naval reserve, accompanied by the music of various bands, and under the direction of Capt. H. T. Richardson, formerly of the Dragoon Guards, son of the inventor of this type of life-boat. The boat was then named Rescue, and launched on demonstration.

Within 18 months, as the Liverpool Dock Trustees had found, it was necessary to place a second boat at New Brighton, and a No.2 station was started in July 1864. This boat too was unusual, as it was a 33-foot Iron boat rather than the usual wooden boats. She was named Willie and Arthur.

By 1867, a boathouse had been constructed at a cost of £208, sited near the Pier at the end of Egerton Street.

On the morning of 27 September 1875, both the RNLI New Brighton lifeboat and the Mersey Docks and Harbour Board lifeboat from Liverpool, were called to the aid of the ship Ellen Southard of Richmond, Maine, aground on Taylor's Bank. Arriving first, the Liverpool lifeboat rescued 17 people, but was then capsized, pitching everyone into the water. The New Brighton quickly picked up 20 people, but 11 were lost, including the Ship's Captain and wife, the local pilot, and 2 lifeboat crew. Each of the New Brighton crew, and the surviving crew of the Liverpool lifeboat, were subsequently awarded a gold Lifesaving Medal by the United States government for their gallantry.

In 1893, New Brighton received the Duke of Northumberland (ON 231), transferred from Holyhead to be the No.2 lifeboat. The boat was a 50-foot Steam-powered lifeboat, using Water-Jets as a means of propulsion, over 140 years before this type of technology was again utilised by the RNLI, in the present day Shannon-class lifeboats. When the boat was required to be returned to Holyhead, the RNLI commissioned another Steam-class lifeboat. Arriving on station in 1897, she was named Queen (ON 404) to celebrate the Diamond Jubilee of Queen Victoria.

The 60-foot Barnett-class lifeboat William and Kate Johnston (ON 682), replacement for Queen, was assigned to be the No.1 station boat in 1938.

Both No.1 and No.2 station boats were retired in 1950, being replaced by just one boat, effectively closing the No.2 station. The 52-foot Barnett-class lifeboat Norman B. Corlett (ON 883) remained in service until 1973, when it was decided that the All-weather lifeboat would be withdrawn, and replaced with a fast Inshore B-class (Atlantic 21). With the Atlantic-class boat having to be stored 1.5 miles (2.4 km) from the station until a new boathouse was built, a D-class (RFD PB16) lifeboat was also placed on service for 18 months.

In response to the number of rescues required on the large expanse of mud and sand at the end of the Wirral Peninsular, the RNLI placed one of their seven Griffon Hoverwork Type 470TD Hovercraft on station in 2004. This Hovercraft was relocated to Hoylake in 2016.

== Notable rescues ==
The New Brighton Barnett-class lifeboat William and Kate Johnston (ON 682) was launched at 07:45 on 24 November 1928, into violent seas and gale force winds, gusting at times up to 100 mph (160 km/h), to the French steamer Emile Delmas of La Rochelle, dragging her anchors 4 miles (6.4 km) WNW of the Bar Lightship. With incredible seamanship and skill in extremely difficult conditions, Coxswain Robinson brought the lifeboat alongside, and 23 crew were rescued. The Captain refused to leave until after the vessel ran aground, by which time the lifeboat had been damaged.

As the lifeboat made for home, a huge wave washed over the lifeboat, flooding the engine room, and two crew, George Carmody and Samuel Jones, were washed overboard, along with the Chief Engineer of the Emile Delmas. The Chief Engineer was lost, but the two lifeboat men regained the boat, which then limped back to New Brighton, arriving after a service lasting six hours. Silver and bronze gallantry medals were awarded by the RNLI. The owners of the Emile Delmas gifted 10,000 French francs to New Brighton Lifeboat Station, and the French government awarded gold medals to Coxswain George Robinson, and to the two lifeboat men washed overboard.

== Station honours ==
The following are awards made at New Brighton:

- Gold Medal, awarded by the United States Government
  Each of New Brighton lifeboat crews – 1875
  Each of the survivors of the crew of the Liverpool lifeboat – 1875
- Gold Medal, awarded by the French Government
  George Robinson, Coxswain – 1928
  George James Carmody, crew member – 1928
  Samuel J. Jones, crew member – 1928
- RNIPLS Silver Medal
  Peter Cropper, Coxswain, Liverpool Lifeboat – 1851
  Thomas Evans, Coxswain, Magazine Lifeboat – 1851
  Joseph Formby, Coxswain, Formby Lifeboat – 1851
- RNLI Silver Medal
  Thomas Evans, Coxswain – 1863 (Second-Service clasp)
  Thomas Evans, Jnr – 1863
  William Evans – 1863
  Richard J. Thomas, Coxswain – 1870
  Hiram Linaker, crew member – 1877
  William Martin, Coxswain – 1894
  George Robinson, Coxswain – 1928
  William Henry Jones, Coxswain – 1938
  Edward Brown, Coxswain – 1974
  Robin Middleton, crew member – 1974
- Silver Medal, awarded by the Liverpool Shipwreck and Humane Society
  J. W. Bray, Mechanic – 1946
- RNLI Bronze Medal
  John Rowland Nicholson, crew member – 1928
  George James Carmody, crew member – 1928
  Ralph B. Scott, crew member – 1928
  Wilfred Garbutt, crew member – 1928
  Samuel J. Jones, crew member – 1928
  William Liversage, crew member – 1928
  John H. Moore, crew member – 1928
  John Rowland Nicholson, Second Coxswain – 1938
  Wilfred Garbutt, Mechanic – 1938
  John E. Mason, Second Mechanic – 1938
  William Stephen Jones, Second Coxswain – 1947
  William Stephen Jones, Acting Coxswain – 1950 (Second-Service clasp)
  George Stonall, Coxswain – 1957
  Edward Beverley Brown, Helm – 1982
- The Ralph Glister Award 1987
  for the most meritorious service carried out in a lifeboat under 10 metres
  Anthony Clare, Helm – 1988
  Geoffrey Prince, crew member – 1988
  Anthony Jones, crew member – 1988
- 'The Thanks of the Institution inscribed on Vellum'
  Clifford Downing, crew member – 1974
  Alan Boult, crew member – 1974
  Ian Campbell, crew member – 1974
  Edward B. Brown, Helm – 1976
  Michael Jones, crew member – 1982
  Anthony Clare. Helm – 1988
  Michael Jones, crew member – 1994
  Tony Clare, crew member – 1994
  Michael Jones, Helm – 1995
  Michael Jones, Helm – 2000
- 'A Framed Letter of Thanks signed by the Chairman of the Institution'
  Geoffrey Prince, crew member – 1988
  Anthony Jones, crew member – 1988
  Neil Jones, crew member – 1994
  Barry Shillinglaw, crew member – 1994
  Tony Jones, shore helper – 1994
  Howard Jones, crew member – 1995
  Neil Jones, crew member – 1995
  Michael Haxby, crew member – 1995
  Richard Finlay, County Rescue Boat – 1995
  John Goodwin, County Rescue Boat – 1995
  Mark Bland, Helm – 2005
  Mark Harding, crew member – 2005
  Greg Morgan, crew member – 2005
- 'A Collective Letter of Thanks signed by the Chairman of the Institution'
  Barry Shillinglaw, crew member – 1980
  Paul Wright, crew member – 1980
  Howard Jones, crew member – 1980
- 'Collective Letter of Appreciation signed by the Director of the Institution'
  Eight shore helpers from the station – 1980
- 'A Letter of Appreciation signed by the Chief of Operations'
  Station Honorary Secretary – 1980
- Member, Order of the British Empire (MBE)
  Philip Gerald Hockey, Lifeboat Press Officer – 2007QBH
  Anthony Joseph Jones – 2026NYH

== Roll of honour ==
In memory of those lost whilst serving at New Brighton:

- Lost when washed overboard from the Stuart Hay, whilst searching for an unknown casualty vessel, 26 January 1883
  Charles Finlay
- Overcome by fumes, and died whilst on overnight watch duty on the Queen (ON 404), 29 November 1905
  Allan Dodd, crewman (36)
  John Jones, crewman (36)
- Suffered serious kidney damage after being thrown violently across the boat, aboard the Queen (ON 404), 18 December 1919, and died three years later on 12 October 1922.
  George Cross, Second Coxswain (40)
- Died later from the effects of exposure, after maintaining watch on the New Brighton landing stage, 17 November 1923.
  W. J. Liversage, Assistant Secretary (58)
- Drowned when the boarding boat capsized during recovery, after being swept away down river by a flood tide, 9 March 1925.
  Herbert Harrison, Second Mechanic (30)
- Collapsed and died whilst fishing, a few days after the medal winning service in extreme conditions to the Progress of Hoylake, and the schooner Loch Ranza Castle, 23 November 1938.
  J. Stonall, crewman (46)
- Drowned after falling from the boarding boat whilst trying to tie-up alongside, 6 March 1962
  Frank. K. Neilson, Second Mechanic (61)

== Magazines lifeboats (Liverpool Dock Trustees) ==
=== Magazines No. 1 ===
Name	Built	On station	Class	Comments
Unnamed	1827	1827−1830	26-foot 8in Liverpool	(Note: 26 ft 8 in (8.13 m) x 8 ft 3 in (2.51 m) Liverpool-class non-self-righting lifeboat, funded from Harbour Dues.); Transferred to Point of Air No. 1.
Unnamed	1826	1830−1844	30-foot Liverpool	(Note: 30 ft 0 in (9.14 m) x 9 ft 3 in (2.82 m) (12-oared) Liverpool-class non-self-righting lifeboat, funded from Harbour Dues.); Previously at Point of Air No. 1.

=== Magazines No. 2 ===
Name	Built	On station	Class	Comments
Unnamed	1839	1839−1863	30-foot Liverpool	(Note: 30 ft 0 in (9.14 m) x 9 ft 3 in (2.82 m) (10-oared) Liverpool-class non-self-righting lifeboat, funded from Harbour Dues, built by Thomas Costain of Liverpool, costing £180.); Broken up in 1863.

== New Brighton lifeboats (RNLI) ==
=== New Brighton / New Brighton (No.1) Station ===
ON (Note: ON is the RNLI's Official Number of the boat.)	Name	Built	On station	Class	Comments
Pre-387	Rescue	1862	1863−1866	42-foot Tubular (P&S)	Removed from service November 1866 for rebuild. Renamed Willie and Arthur and returned in 1867.
Pre-380	Latimer	1860	1866−1867	34-foot 6in Peake self-righting (P&S)	(Note: Modified 34 ft 6 in (10.52 m) x 8 ft 0 in (2.44 m) (12-oared) Peake-class self-righting (P&S) lifeboat, funded by The Duke of Northumberland, built by Forrestt of Limehouse, London, costing £144.); Relief lifeboat, previously at Newbiggin
Pre-387	Willie and Arthur	1862	1867−1876	40-foot 3in Tubular	
71	Willie and Arthur	1876	1876−1890	45-foot Tubular (P&S)	Condemned in 1890.
221	Henry Richardson	1888	1890−1892; 1893–1898	43-foot Tubular (P&S)	Previously New Brighton No.2. New Brighton No. 1 from 1893.
414	Henry Richardson	1898	1898−1919	43-foot Watson (P&S)	
637	Staughton	1915	1919−1930	40-foot Watson (P&S)	
550	Anne Miles	1905	1930−1936	43-foot Watson (P&S)	
535	Reserve No.7E	1904	1936−1938	43-foot Watson (P&S)	
682	William and Kate Johnston	1923	1938−1950	60-foot Barnett	Previously New Brighton No.2.
883	Norman B. Corlett	1950	1950−1973	52-foot Barnett (Mk. I)	

All-weather lifeboat replaced with a B-class (Atlantic 21) Inshore lifeboat, 1973
Pre ON numbers are unofficial numbers used by the Lifeboat Enthusiasts' Society to reference early lifeboats not included on the official RNLI list.
More post-service details can be found on the respective lifeboat class pages.

=== New Brighton (No.2) Station ===
ON	Name	Built	On station	Class	Comments
Pre-406	Willie and Arthur	1863	1864−1867	33-foot self-righting (P&S) (Iron)	(Note: 33 ft 0 in (10.06 m) x 8 ft 2 in (2.49 m) (10-oared) self-righting (P&S) (Iron) lifeboat, funded by Mr J. Leather of Liverpool, built by Hepworth of Millwall, costing £351.); Previously China at Teignmouth. Transferred to Buddon Ness.
Pre-494	Lily	1867	1867−1878	32-foot Prowse self-righting (P&S)	(Note: 32 ft 0 in (9.75 m) x 7 ft 6 in (2.29 m) (10-oared) Prowse-class self-righting (P&S) lifeboat, gift of Mr J. Leather of Liverpool, built by Woolfe of Shadwell, London, costing £248.); Transferred to Kirkcudbright.
Pre-625	Stuart Hay	1878	1878−1888	40-foot Tubular (P&S)	
221	Henry Richardson	1888	1888−1890	43-foot Tubular (P&S)	Became sole New Brighton lifeboat following withdrawal of ON 71 in 1890.
Station Closed 1890–1893
231	Duke of Northumberland	1889	1893−1897	50-foot Steam	Previously at Harwich and Holyhead. Transferred to Holyhead.
404	Queen	1897	1897−1923	55-foot Steam	Left station to take part in the 1924 Thames flotilla for the RNLI 100th Anniversary.
682	William and Kate Johnston	1923	1923−1938	60-foot Barnett	Largest RNLI lifeboat at time of construction.
812	Edmund and Mary Robinson	1938	1938−1950	41-foot Watson	

No.2 Station Closed 1950
More post-service details can be found on the respective lifeboat class pages.

=== New Brighton (No.3) Station ===
ON	Name	Built	On station	Class	Comments
76	Unnamed	1884	1884−1887	46-foot self-righting (P&S)	(Note: 46 ft 0 in (14.02 m) x 11 ft 0 in (3.35 m) (12-oared) self-righting (P&S) lifeboat, funded by the RNLI, built by Woolfe of Shadwell, London, costing £583.); Later Edith at Fleetwood.

No.3 Station closed in 1887

=== Hovercraft ===
Op.No. (Note: Op.No. is the RNLI's Operational Number carried on the hull or vehicle.)	Name	On station	Class	Comments
H-005	Hurley Spirit	2004−2016	H-class (Griffon Hoverwork 470TD)	Transferred to Hoylake.

=== Inshore lifeboats ===
==== D class ====
Op.No.	Name	On station	Class	Comments
D-42	Unnamed	1973–1974	D-class (RFD PB16)	

==== B class ====
Op.No.	Name	On station	Class	Comments
B-509	Unnamed	1973–1981	B-class (Atlantic 21)	
B-549	Blenwatch	1981–1996	B-class (Atlantic 21)	
B-721	Rock Light	1996–2009	B-class (Atlantic 75)	
B-837	Charles Dibdin (Civil Service No.51)	2009–	B-class (Atlantic 85)	

=== Launch and recovery tractors ===
Op. No.	Reg. No.	Type	On station	Comments
TW01	XTK 150M	Talus MB-764 County	1974–1987	
TW14	D659 TNT	Talus MB-764 County	1987–1990	
TW17	H593 PUX	Talus MB-4H Hydrostatic (Mk1.5)	1990–1995	
TW16	H610 SUJ	Talus MB-4H Hydrostatic (Mk1.5)	1995–2001	
TW46	V938 EAW	Talus MB-4H Hydrostatic (Mk1.5)	2001–2008	
TW45	T249 JNT	Talus MB-4H Hydrostatic (Mk1)	2008–2016	
TW20	J125 WUJ	Talus MB-4H Hydrostatic (Mk2)	2016–	

== See also ==
- List of RNLI stations
- List of former RNLI stations
- Royal National Lifeboat Institution lifeboats
- Talus Atlantic 85 DO-DO launch carriage
