= Archdeacon of Dudley =

Church of England ecclesiastical office

The Archdeacon of Dudley is one of two archdeacons in the Anglican Diocese of Worcester, England (the other being the Archdeacon of Worcester).

== History ==
The archdeaconry of Dudley was created by Order in Council on 11 February 1921 from the Worcester archdeaconry and named after the town of Dudley. It consists of the deaneries of Bromsgrove, Droitwich, Dudley, Kidderminster, Kingswinford, Stourbridge and Stourport.

The present Archdeacon of Dudley is the Venerable Nikki Groarke, formerly vicar of St Stephen's Church, Canonbury, Islington, in the Diocese of London; she is the first woman to hold the post and was installed on 5 January 2014.

== List of archdeacons ==
- 1921–1934 (d.): Sydney James
- 1934–1951 (ret.): Arthur Shepherd (afterwards archdeacon emeritus)
- 1951–1968 (ret.): Alfred Hurley (afterwards archdeacon emeritus)
- 1968–1975 (res.): John Williams (afterwards Archdeacon of Worcester)
- 1976–1984 (res.): Christopher Campling (afterwards Dean of Ripon)
- 1985–1986 (res.): Robin Bennett
- 1987–2001 (ret.): John Gathercole
- 2001–September 2013 (ret.): Fred Trethewey
- 2014-present: Nikki Groarke

== Deaneries, area deans and lay chairs as of 2024 ==
Deanery	Rural dean	Lay chair
Redditch & Bromsgrove	The Revd Canon Paul Lawlor	Kashmir Garton
Greater Dudley	The Revd Andrew Sillis	John Nicholson

== See also ==
- Bishop of Worcester
- Worcester Cathedral
