= Charles Foote Gower =

English soap manufacturer

Charles Gower
- Born: Charles Foote Gower; 1807
- Died: 1867 (aged 59–60)
- Occupation: Soap manufacturer

Mayor of Ipswich
- In office 1853–1854

Charles Foote Gower (1807–28 January 1867) was an English soap manufacturer based in Ipswich. He was a significant businessman in that town.

== Family life ==
Charles was the son of Richard Hall Gower, the son of Foote Gower, and Elizabeth Emptage, the daughter of George Emptage. The family moved to Nova Scotia House, Ipswich in 1817.

He and his wife Sarah had three children: Charles Foote Gower (1838), John Nathaniel Gower (1839) Mary Rebecca Gower (1840).

== Business activity ==
Gower was in partnership with Charles Colchester as soapmakers until this was dissolved in 1845.

Then in 1846 he became a major investor in the railways with an invested capital of £40,462.

In 1847 he published The Scientific Phenomena of Domestic Life, Familiarly Explained. In this book he aimed to encourage the "young reader" to "arrange his enquiries and mode of thinking that he may the more readily be enabled to explain for himself the cause of any fresh fact which excites and interests his enquiring mind."

He was elected to the Ipswich Council in 1851 and then became Mayor of Ipswich 1853–1854.
