= Southsea Lifeboat Station =

Former RNLI lifeboat station in Hampshire, England

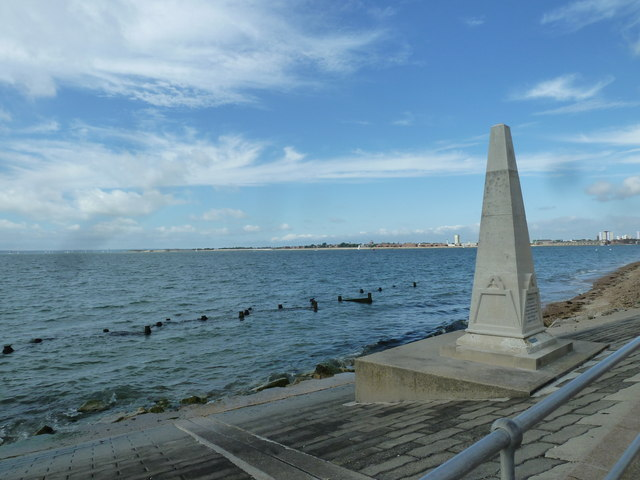
- Former location of Southsea Lifeboat Station.

- Southsea, Hampshire

General information
- Status: Closed
- Type: RNLI Lifeboat Station
- Location: Southsea Common, Southsea, Hampshire, PO5 3AE, England
- Coordinates: 50°46′56.1″N 1°05′46.1″W
- Opened: 1886
- Closed: 1918

Southsea Lifeboat Station was located adjacent to the HMS Aboukir monument, on the beach next to Southsea Common, in Southsea, a seaside resort on Portsea Island, at the entrance to Portsmouth Harbour, in the county of Hampshire.

A lifeboat was first stationed at Southsea by the Royal National Lifeboat Institution (RNLI) in 1886.

Southsea Lifeboat Station was closed in 1918.

== History ==
In 1886, the RNLI established a lifeboat station at Southsea. The location was considered to be an ideal position "whence a Life-boat can proceed, either under sail or in tow of the Admiralty or other steam-tugs, to shipwrecks along that coast and round the eastern approaches to Spithead." A boathouse was constructed along the beach at Southsea Common, costing £366, on a site granted by the War Department.

The Heyland (ON 38), a 37-foot 12-oared 'Pulling and Sailing' (P&S) lifeboat, one with oars and sails, built in 1882, was transported to Portsmouth Naval Dockyard. The boat had initially been placed at Palling, and then Clacton-on-Sea, but weighing 4-tons, had been found unsuitable and difficult to launch at both locations. The cost of the boat was defrayed by a fund raised in memory of the late Lieutenant William Pierre Lunell Heyland, RN, an officer of HMS Minotaur, previously decorated by the Royal Humane Society for gallantry, who hit his head on the stern of the ship, and was lost, whilst saving the life of a sailor who had fallen overboard.

The lifeboat was taken in procession from Portsmouth Naval Dockyard to the new lifeboat house on 5 June 1886, followed by a large crowd, representatives of HMS Minotaur, and accompanied by the band of the Royal Marine Artillery.

At 07:00 on 3 March 1897, having been alerted by rockets sent up by the Warner Lightship, the Southsea lifeboat Heyland was launched to the aid of the ketch Fox of Cowes, bound for the Isle of Wight with a cargo of stoneware pipes. In gale-force conditions, the lifeboat arrived just in time to rescue the crew of two, before the vessel sank. The steam-tug Dromedary was despatched from Portsmouth to tow the lifeboat back to port.

At 17:50 on 13 January 1899, Heyland was launched into a WSW gale, to the aid of the ketch Queen of the Fleet of Portsmouth, on passage from Plymouth to Leith with a cargo of china clay. With her sails blown away, and leaking badly, lifeboat crew were requested to go aboard and assist with the pumps. A tug-boat was summoned, and the vessel was towed in to Camber Dock at 22:45.

In 1908, now 22-years-old, the Heyland was withdrawn, and sold from service. A relief lifeboat, believed to be the 37-foot 2in Quiver No.1 (ON 265) (Reserve No. 3A) was placed at Southsea. The lifeboat had been funded from donations from the weekly magazine The Quiver.

The RNLI received a legacy of £900 from the late Mr Richard Crawley of Southampton in 1904. The gift was used to provide a new lifeboat for Southsea. The 37-foot lifeboat Richard Crawley (ON 596) was placed at Southsea in 1910.

Southsea Lifeboat Station was closed in 1918. No records can be found of any service by the Richard Crawley at Southsea. The RNLI decided that the area would be adequately covered by the stations at Hayling Island to the east, and at Bembridge on the Isle of Wight. A motor-powered lifeboat had been proposed for Bembridge, and the 40-foot lifeboat Langham (ON 676) was subsequently placed on service there in 1922. The boathouse was sold to the council for £250, and later used as a tearoom, but nothing now remains. The lifeboat on station at the time, Richard Crawley (ON 596), was placed into the relief fleet, before serving at Ilfracombe between 1920 and 1936.

== Roll of honour ==
In memory of those lost whilst serving Southsea lifeboat.

- Died suddenly on the day following lifeboat exercise, 1892

Edward Main, Coxswain (48)

== Southsea lifeboats ==
=== Pulling and Sailing (P&S) lifeboats ===
ON (Note: ON is the RNLI's Official Number of the boat.)	Name	Built	On station	Class	Comments
38	Heyland	1882	1886−1908	37-foot Self-righting (P&S)	(Note: 37-foot x 9-foot (10/12-oared) self-righting (P&S) lifeboat, gift of the Heyland LB fund, built by Woolfe of Shadwell, London, costing £430 when new.); Previously at Palling and Clacton-on-Sea.
265	Quiver No.1	1883	1908−1910	37-foot Self-righting (P&S)	(Note: 37-foot x 9-foot (12-oared) self-righting (P&S) lifeboat, gift of The Quiver magazine LB fund, built by Woolfe of Shadwell, London, costing £430 when new.); Reserve lifeboat No. 3A, previously at Margate.
596	Richard Crawley	1910	1910−1918	37-foot Self-righting (P&S)	(Note: 37-foot x 9-foot 3in (10-oared) self-righting (P&S) lifeboat, legacy of Mr R. Crawley of Southampton, built by Thames Ironworks of Blackwall, London, costing £1,167.)

== See also ==
- List of RNLI stations
- List of former RNLI stations
- Royal National Lifeboat Institution lifeboats
