= Richard Hall Gower =

English sea captain, philosopher, inventor and entrepreneur (1768–1833)

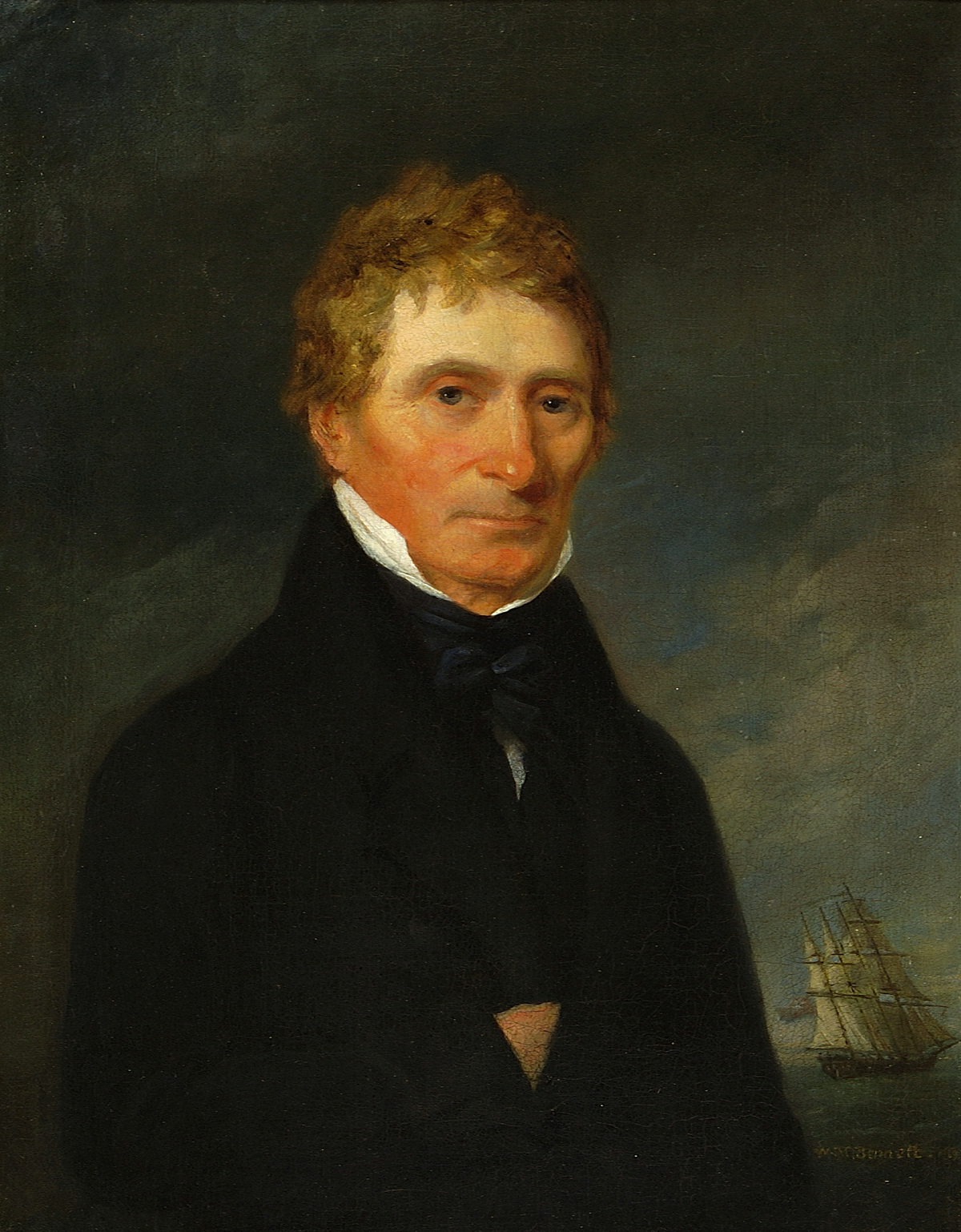
Portrait of Gower

Richard Hall Gower (1768 – July 1833) was an English sea captain, philosopher, inventor and entrepreneur.

== Mariner ==
Richard was the youngest son of Rev. Foote Gower, physician and antiquarian, and Elizabeth, a sister of John Strutt, Member of Parliament for Maldon. He won a scholarship to Winchester College. He left school, "thankfully", to join the British East India Company as a midshipman in the vessel Essex carrying troops and invalids. He was a lively and observant lad. At the age of 16 he was promoted captain of the main top, where he waged active war with the lads of the fore top, shrouds and stays providing the high roads of communication. He was noted for his spirit and ingenuity, his depth of knowledge of his ship and his skill as a ship model maker; unravelling stockings to obtain rigging materials.

When he returned to England after his first three-year voyage, he studied navigation at Edmonton and, on rejoining ship, was dubbed "the young philosopher". Ever inventive, he once fitted a canvas speaking tube from the main top to the deck, installing it overnight to surprise and please his captain. To his bitter dismay, his captain had it removed instantly saying he was sure the topmen would "use it for an improper purpose". Gower rose to chief mate of the Essex and qualified as a captain. He returned to shore in 1783 to teach at Edmonton and to publish his Practical Guide that eventually went into at least three editions. He designed, and applied for a patent for a Ship's log very similar to the logs employed to this day. He turned down the offer of the command of an East Indiaman to make ship models and to pursue his interest in naval architecture and in the, then much needed, improvement of ship design.

== Empirical Philosopher ==
The Age of Reason and the Industrial Revolution had brought experimental enquiry, scientific reasoning and, thus, engineering to bear on the legends, traditions and practices of all the crafts. Naval architects and shipwrights were no exceptions. Richard Gower quoted a Mr Mackonochie " ... in a mechanical point of view (a ship) is the feeblest, most inartificial, and unworkmanlike structure in the whole range of mechanics". Gower continued to the effect that almost any vessel, however badly it may sail, would probably get there in the end, if the wind and weather be fair. That, he thought, was not nearly good enough. He was among the first to bring empirical science to bear on naval architecture. His intention was to so improve ship design that, in whatever wind and weather, vessels would sail safely, speedily and economically with a crew properly accommodated and put to no unnecessary risk.

Traditionally, the design of hulls, rigging, sails and outfittings had been the provinces of several separate specialists. Commonly, shipyards built the hulls of vessels and, after launching, riggers and sailmakers outfitted them. Most innovation was confined to improvement of the hull, to increase carrying capacity of merchantmen and to improve the stability of warships as gun platforms. The results were broad, squat boxes, hydrodynamically inefficient, with squalid accommodation for the crew and complicated rigging that entailed much very dangerous work aloft.

It was just about the turn of the century that both the Royal Navy and the Royal Mail recognised the need for fast vessels for scouting and for carrying messages and mail to and from the United Kingdom and her dominions and colonies overseas. These newly recognised tasks required new designs of vessels and new opportunities for invention. Gower was among those who saw a vessel as a single entity in which all the parts, hull, rigging, sails and, in Gower's view, the crew, should relate to each other in ways appropriate to the task to be performed. This entailed giving greater consideration to designing the vessel as a whole, rather than leaving it to the various crafts to perform their respective works as best they could. Today, we would call his approach "holistic".

By this time, to be successful, innovations had to be well founded in good science, properly protected against plagiarism by letters patent and backed by the Crown, government, patrons or merchant venturers. So Gower defended most of his ideas with an applications for patents, in which he expounded the physical theories he believed supported his innovations as well as describing the matters which he claimed to be original inventions. He then sought every opportunity of stalking the corridors of power and seeking contacts in high places. He proposed no innovation that did not make sound military or commercial sense.

== Inventor ==
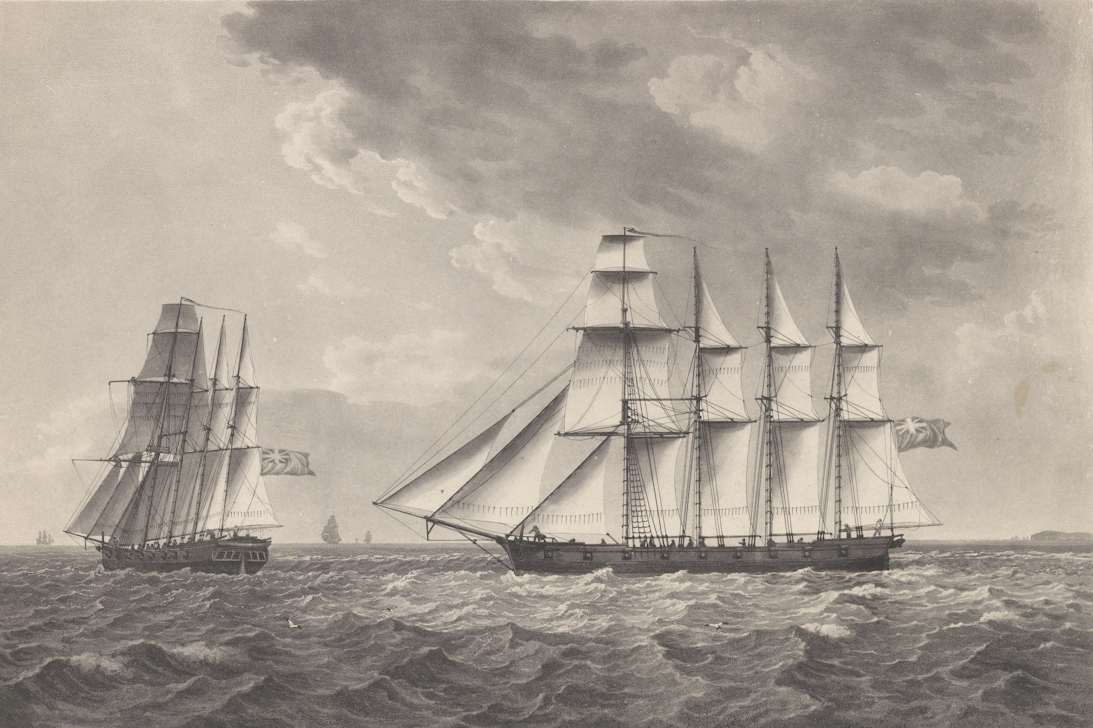
Two views of Transit (1800)

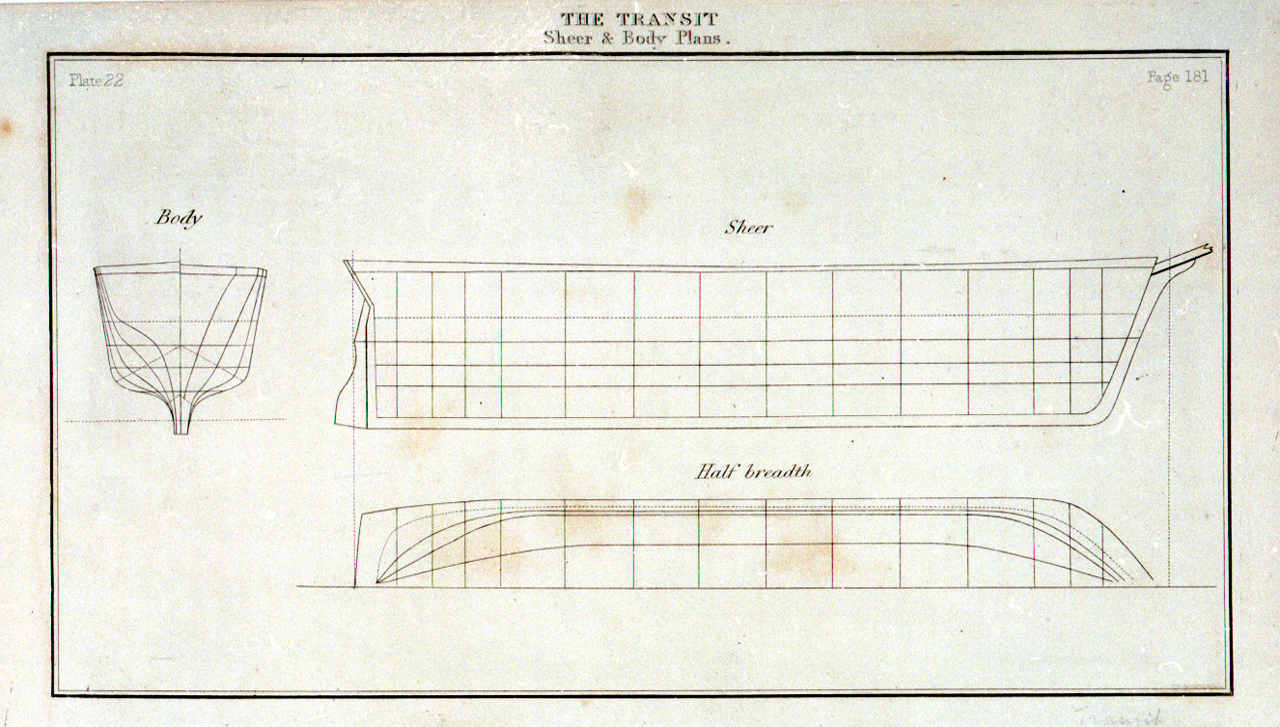
The Transit (1800). Sheer & Body Plans

Gower and his family removed to Nova Scotia House at Ipswich in 1817. There he devoted himself to the invention, patenting, design and building of a remarkable series of novel vessels including three vessels named Transit, a fly boat, two yachts the Unique and the Gower, the Landguard Fort Lifeboat, and a number of other inventions. He entered, but did not win, a competition for a novel form of lock for the Regent's Canal. He suggested that, to protect coastal traffic, cruisers be stationed along the coast in communication with signal stations to provide a concerted defence system. He proposed a form of vertical-vaned windmill; an eye shade; various ship's logs and a "double-barrelled" capstan to do two jobs at once. He suggested a non-elastic substitute for imported hempen standing rigging to be made of wooden cylinders joined by iron straps. He devised a method of keeping ships at proper distances by using the mast as a base line. He invented a mode of dropping a guess warp anchor with such accuracy that its end could be easily found and lifted. He devised a novel method of fidding a topgallant mast and several contrivances for the "better nipping and stopping a cable". He designed a long catamaran for forming a life raft and a form of floating sea anchor, or drogue anchor (he called it a "propeller") like an umbrella. He created a set of signals, that could be seen from all angles, using shapes instead of flags. He also suggested using a floating compass needle to find North. He experimented with various designs of paddle wheel on the River Lee Canal that anticipated the design of the wheels used by steam paddlers many years later. He invented and built the Landguard Fort Lifeboat, which carried up to 25 people and was virtually unsinkable. He proposed fitting canal barges with 'spud wheels' that could propel the vessel by catching on the canal bottom. He saw that a combination of paddle wheels and spud wheels could take vessels over mud flats at various conditions of the tide. Gower also constructed a twin hulled catamaran, just ten feet long, on which he mounted a barrel of water that drained to underwater by a curved pipe pointing aft. His twin floats achieved two miles per hour apparently without the need for power from sail or steam. He thus demonstrated water jet propulsion. He anticipated that a steam water pump, so contrived, could propel vessels without the need for paddles. He gives credit to Dr Franklin (probably Benjamin Franklin) and a Mr Rumsay of Philadelphia for this idea and hoped that his little experiment would encourage others to pursue the notion.

== Entrepreneur ==
The design, building and sailing of the vessels Transit and the promotion of the novel ideas that he incorporated in them, occupied much of his life. The most original features of these vessels were their slab sides above, and the concave and convex sweeps of the hull, below the waterline, the Joints scarfed and bolted rather than chocked and treenailed, ballast was iron cast into special shapes to sit just above the deadwood and between the floor timbers and the narrowest part of the hull above the keel was reinforced by strong cross timbers bolted through the sides. Such extensive use of iron was a novel feature at the time. Gower observed that conventional vessels were box-like and needed much movement of the rudder from side to side to preserve a steady course. When running fast, they often suffered total loss of steerage because the water failed "to close over the rudder" and left it in a "mere hole or vacuum in the water" (what we now call "cavitation"). He appreciated too that drag is proportionate to the wetted surface of the hull, and that a long narrow hull with a deep narrow keel makes for speed. In the case of the Transit, the tapering lines also allowed the rudder to hang abaft the general spread of the bottom. This "enlivened" the steering; yet the rudder was not vulnerable to damage when the vessel grounded. Except when she was to put about, a spoke of the helm either way could steer the Transit.

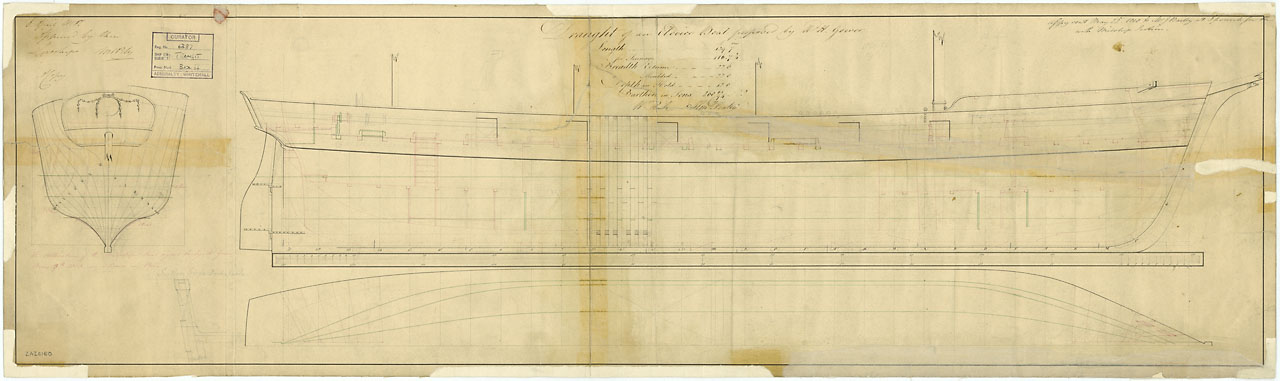
Transit (1809)

Several attempts to arouse the interest of the Hon. East India Company and the Royal Mail. These failed, and the Transit loaded cargo and sailed to join convoy in June 1801. While waiting for the convoy to assemble, Gower, ever the salesman, showed her off to the King and his party on the Royal Yacht in Christchurch Bay. Gower learned later that, although George III had asked many questions about the Transit, none present had been able to answer him and none thought to ask the inventor who was nearby. Later the Chairman of the Hon. East India Company summoned Gower to a meeting. Gower says that the chairman said that the Company would buy the Transit, provided she proved to be a fast-sailing vessel. At the instance of Earl St Vincent, now the First Lord of the Admiralty, the Transit was tried against Osprey. She was a fast sloop of 383 tons (about twice the tonnage of the Transit) and, according to Gower, the commander of Osprey was generous in his praise. To Gower's chagrin, no order was forthcoming and he had to re-ship his cargo and join convoy for Lisbon on 27 August. The important question of what happened to change the decision of the Company is, as yet, unresolved. Perhaps Gower put a gloss on the intention of the Chairman of the Company or on the opinion of Osprey's captain. Perhaps someone in the Admiralty tampered with Osprey's report before forwarding it to the Company. Perhaps there was some aspect of the design of the Transit, say her problems in shallow tidal harbours, or the strange way of her sailing, that killed off the Company's enthusiasm. Maybe there is still a note in some archive that could tell us why the Transit did not become the first of a new generation of fast traders.

== Humanitarian ==
Captain Gower was a regular contributor, mainly on nautical subjects, to the Suffolk Chronicle under the initials R. G. or "John Splice". He expressed much concern about the cramped and squalid conditions under which Jack Tar had to work and he deplored the cruel and heartless behaviour of many captains. His concern for the plight of the labouring classes extended to that of agricultural labourers. He applauded the formation of the East Sussex Agricultural Association and, in supporting it, criticised the poor quality of local builders, comparing them very unfavourably with Italian house builders. He cited in evidence draughty walls, leaky chimneys, insecure joists and the general paucity of decoration. He inveighed against crown glass, small window panes and the window tax. He described how plate glass was made in Italy and hoped that it would soon be made in Britain also.

His last letters expressed his concern about the hardships of sailor boys, the reasons for the mutinies in the Navy and the perils of convoy. He gave a vivid description of traditional Naval punishments. He thought that these cruelties, so readily meted out to sailors just for disobedience, would be better applied to those on land who ill-treat, forge, rob and plunder the peaceable inhabitants of the country. His last article appeared on 18 May 1833 and addressed, among a number of topics, uselessness of our "colossal three-deckers". Twelve of these at anchor may be a stately sight, but what good is it to incarcerate 10,000 seamen in them for ten to fifteen years at a time? He concluded "Our colossal Navy is merely an object of magnificence, and show of power, without opposition in the present state of Europe". His words do have a certain resonance today.

In his last book, published posthumously, Gower reflected on the gigantic advances made in the use of iron and steam. He noted this especially on the railroads where passengers and heavy freight travelled at the extraordinary velocity of thirty miles per hour. He thought that, because of the need for large coal bunkers, 'steam paddlers' were unlikely to replace sail on long trade routes such as the trans-Atlantic crossing. He hoped that vessels of the Transit type would ply across the Ocean until "more portable means shall be invented for putting steamers in motion". Just five years later SS Sirius and Brunel's SS Great Western crossed the Atlantic under steam power alone. Gower was correct in pointing to the need for large bunkers, the former vessel had to burn furniture and fittings to complete her record-breaking voyage, while the latter arrived a day later with 200 tons still in her bunkers.

He died, aged 65, on his estate 'Nova Scotia' near Ipswich in July 1833. He left a widow, two sons and three daughters whom, because of his abhorrence of public schools, he had been teaching by his own peculiar methods. He lies in a vault on the North side of the church of St Mary Stoke, Ipswich, in the company of Master Mariners, shipwrights and men of the sea. A stern disciplinarian, honest and guileless, Gower was "not free from the irritability of genius". He had at heart two passions; for the improvement of sailing vessels and the betterment of the lot of the common sailor.

A Memoir about him concludes "Of him it may with truth be said that by those who knew him best, he was beloved the most; and if the motto Palmam qui meruit ferat (Let he, who has won the palm, wear it) had been verified, the laurels that now shade others heads would have crowned the temples of Richard Hall Gower."

== Family life ==
In 1803 Richard married Elizabeth Emptage (1773–1840), daughter of Commodore George Emptage, who had an inheritance of 32,000 Bombay Rupees. Together they had two sons and five daughters:

- Richard Emptage Gower (1804), a railway clerk and father of Charlotte Chaplin and Walter Gower
- Elizbeth (1806)
- Charles Foote Gower (1807–1867)
- Sarah Rozanna (1811)
- Caroline (1813–1883)
