= Emptage =

Emptage is an English surname. Notable people with the surname include:

- Albert Emptage (1917–1997), English footballer
- George Emptage (1733–1785), English Commodore
