= Ode to Sleep (disambiguation) =

"Ode to Sleep" is a 2011 song by Twenty One Pilots

== Poetry ==
- "Ode to Sleep", by Papinius Statius, translated 1923 by Richard S. Lambert for the Stanton Press
- "Ode to Sleep", by Thomas Falconer
- "Ode to Sleep", by John Ogilvie 1758

== Music ==
- Calliope's ode to sleep ("Gentle Morpheus") in Alceste (Alcides) HWV 45, composed for Giulia Frasi by Handel
