= Emtage =

Emtage is a surname. Notable people with the surname include:

- Alan Emtage (born 1964), Barbadian-born Canadian computer scientist
- James Emtage (1902–1995), Barbadian cricketer

== See also ==
- Emptage
