= Frodsham Hodson =

English churchman and academic

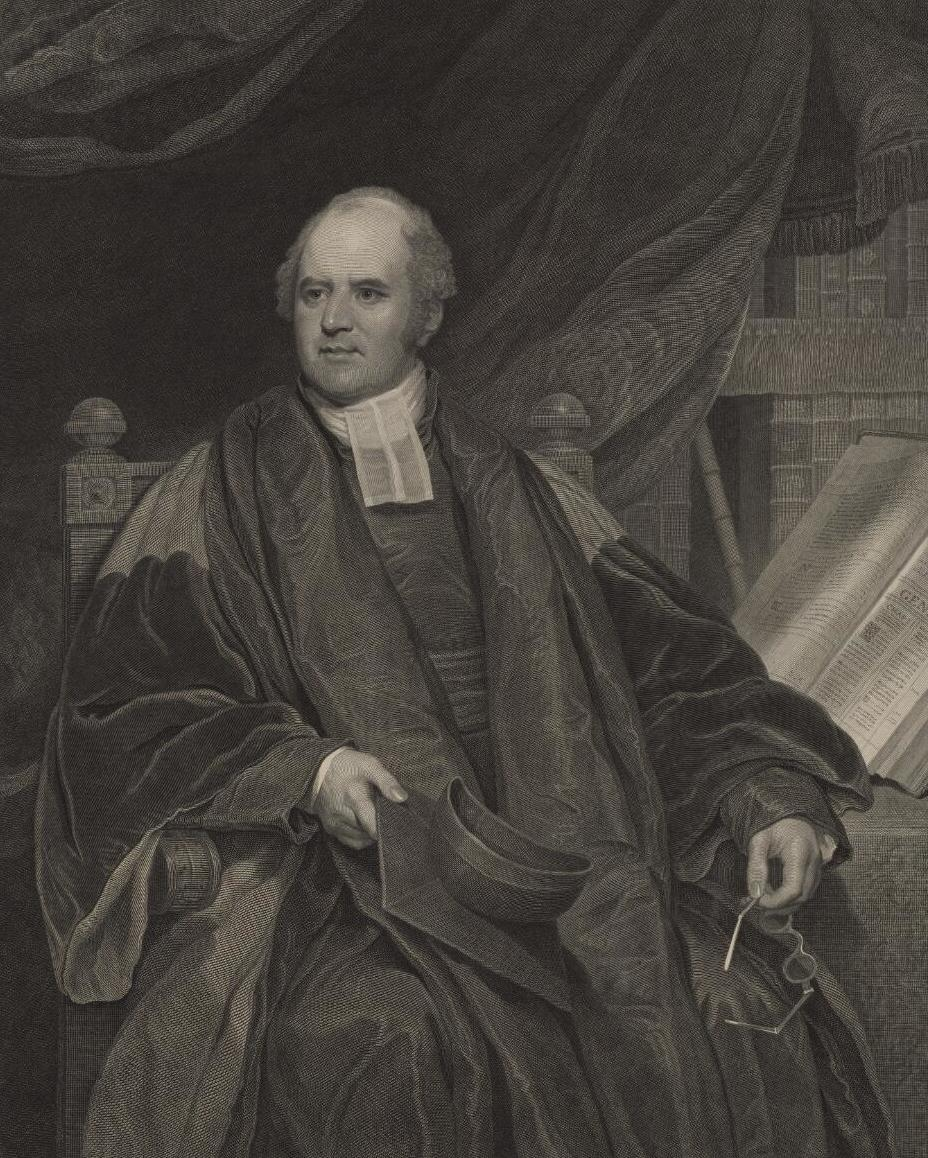
Frodsham Hodson, engraving by James Fittler, after Thomas Phillips.

Frodsham Hodson (1770–1822) was an English churchman and academic, the Principal of Brasenose College, Oxford, from 1809.

== Life ==
He was the son of the Rev. George Hodson, and was born in Liverpool, England, on 7 June 1770. He entered Manchester Grammar School in January 1784, and left it in 1787 to go to Brasenose College, Oxford, where he graduated B.A. on 14 January 1791, M.A. 10 October 1793, B.D. 1808, and D.D. 1809. In May 1791, he succeeded to a Hulmean exhibition, and was afterwards elected a Fellow of Brasenose College. In 1793, he gained the university prize for an essay in English prose on "The Influence of Education and Government on National Character".

In 1795, Hodson was chosen lecturer at St George's Church, Liverpool, and subsequently became chaplain there. His persistence in holding the chaplaincy, although he rarely in later years visited Liverpool, gave offence in the town. In 1803–4 and again in 1808-10, he filled the office of public examiner at Oxford. In 1808 he was appointed rector of St Mary's, Stratford-by-Bow.

In 1809, he vacated his benefice on being elected principal of Brasenose College. He presided over the college for thirteen years, and took a leading part in the affairs of Oxford University. He served the office of Vice-Chancellor in 1818, and was appointed Regius Professor of Divinity, with the appurtenant canonry of Christ Church and rectory of Ewelme, in 1820.

It was believed that Lord Liverpool intended Hodson for a bishopric, but he died, after a short illness, on 18 January 1822, aged 51. He was buried in the ante-chapel of Brasenose College, where he was commemorated in a Latin inscription by Edward Cardwell.

== Works ==
Hodson edited Thomas Falconer's Chronological Tables, 1796. His probationary exercise as a fellow of Brasenose was published in the same year, entitled The Eternal Filiation of the Son of God asserted on the Evidence of the Sacred Scriptures, pp. 81. His only other works were three sermons published at Liverpool, and printed in 1797, 1799, and 1804.

== Family ==
Hodson married, on 30 June 1808, Anne, daughter of John Dawson of Mossley Hill, Liverpool. He left four daughters and a son. His widow died on 23 April 1848.

Academic offices
Preceded by William Cleaver	Principal of Brasenose College, Oxford; 1809–1822	Succeeded by Ashurst Turner Gilbert
Preceded by Thomas Lee	Vice-Chancellor of Oxford University; 1818–1820	Succeeded by George William Hall
