= Steam-class lifeboat =

Former RNLI lifeboat class

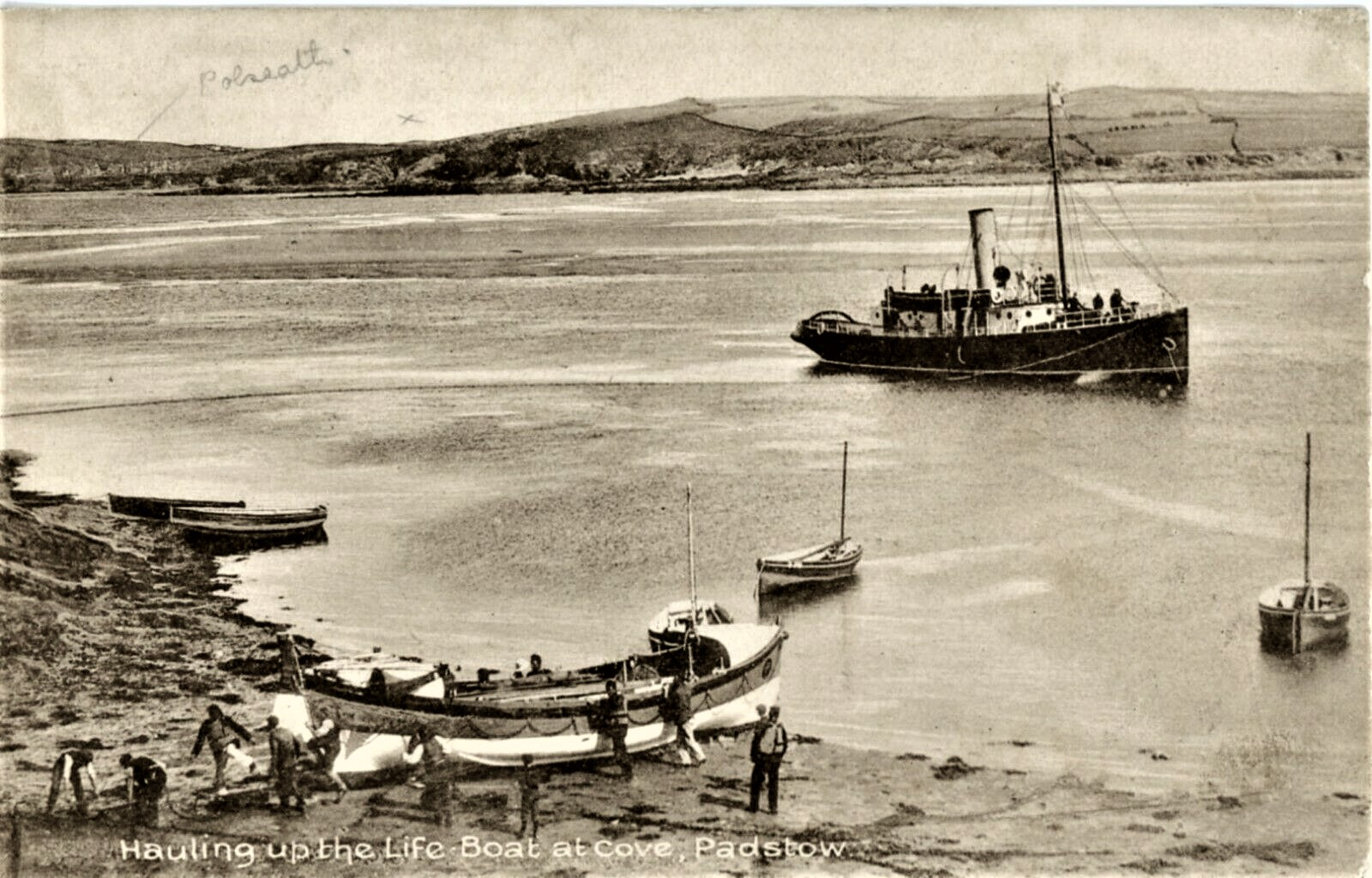
- Steam Tug Helen Peele (ON 478) at Padstow

Class overview
- Name: Steam-class
- Builders: R & H Green, Blackwall, London; Thornecroft, Chiswick; J. Samuel White Cowes; Ramage & Ferguson Leith
- Operators: Royal National Lifeboat Institution
- Built: 1889–1901
- In service: 1890–1929
- Completed: 7
- Retired: 7

General characteristics
- Class & type: Steam / Steam Tug
- Displacement: 30-133 tons GRT
- Length: 50 ft (15 m)–95 ft 6 in (29.11 m)
- Propulsion: Water-Jet, Propellers
- Speed: 9 knots (10.5 mph; 16.5 km/h)

Steam-class lifeboats are a small group of six steam-powered lifeboats, and one steam-tug lifeboat, built between 1889 and 1901.

The first three were the first lifeboats of the Royal National Lifeboat Institution (RNLI) to use pump-jet propulsion, at the time known as "hydraulic steam-driven lifeboats". This was over 120 years ahead of the present day Shannon-class lifeboats, the first of the modern fleet of RNLI lifeboats to use pump-jets.

== History ==
The Royal National Lifeboat Institution had given many reasons why steam power was not considered viable, from difficulties launching, maintaining the boiler in rough weather, requiring the need of a permanently employed engineer, to finding crew with knowledge of steam engines, with most being local sailors and fishermen.

Nevertheless, plans of possible steam lifeboat designs were placed on display at the International Exhibition of Navigation, Commerce and Industry in Liverpool, opened by HM Queen Victoria in May 1886, and an RNLI committee was formed to investigate.

Having found nothing of interest at the Liverpool Exhibition, but still deciding that a steam-powered lifeboat might fulfill certain requirements, the RNLI offered gold and silver medals for drawings and plans suitable for steam lifeboats. Many entries were received, but still none were deemed suitable.

However, in early 1888, shipbuilders R & H Green of Blackwall, London submitted plans with a scale model fof a Hydraulic Steam-Powered lifeboat, which was approved and commissioned.

Rather than being propeller driven, it was the first RNLI lifeboat to use water-jets. An inlet on the bottom of the boat connected to a turbine, pumping the water to outlets on the front and rear of the hull to provide propulsion. It was accepted that the benefits of use in shallower waters outweighed the extra cost of fuel that the turbine demanded, and also that there were limitations to the deployment of the boat, as it would have to be moored afloat.

Sixty years after the idea was first suggested by Sir William Hillary, and after extensive trials, the first steam powered lifeboat, the 50-foot Duke of Northumberland (ON 231 (Note: ON is the RNLI's Official Number of the boat.)) went into service at Harwich in September 1890 later moving to Holyhead.

R & H Green built a second steam lifeboat in 1894, City of Glasgow (ON 362), so named as it was funded by the Glasgow Lifeboat Saturday Fund, and Thorneycroft of Chiswick built Queen (ON 404) in 1897. Both were to use a Water-Jet system of propulsion.

Three more slightly larger steam lifeboats were commissioned and built by manufacturer J. Samuel White of Cowes. Two of these were funded from the £50,000 bequest to the RNLI from Mr James Stevens, a developer from Birmingham, and named James Stevens No.3 (ON 420) and James Stevens No.4 (ON 421). The third replaced the retiring City of Glasgow (ON 362) lifeboat from Harwich, and was also named City of Glasgow (ON 446). However, the primary difference of these boats, was that the water jet system was not utilised, reverting to the more usual propeller screw system.

In its first year on service at Padstow (Harbour), the James Stevens No.4 was wrecked whilst going to the aid of fishing boat Peace and Plenty, with eight lifeboat crew lost.

To replace this boat, a final Steam-powered vessel was commissioned, a much larger 95-foot Steam-Tug, the Helen Peele (ON 478), designed by George Lennox Watson, and built at Ramage & Ferguson, Victoria Shipyard, Leith, arriving at Padstow in 1901.

Helen Peele served her station well for the next 28 years. On what would be her last service at Padstow, in November 1928, she went to the aid of the Port Isaac fishing boat Our Girlie. Having found the fishing boat anchored close to the shore, and in danger of breaking her cable, Capt. Joseph Atkinson managed to bring the Steam-Tug alongside in just two or three fathoms of water (12-18 ft), using oil on the water to calm it, and rescued the five crew just before Our Girlie was wrecked on the rocks. For this service, Capt. Atkinson was awarded the RNLI Bronze Medal.

== Fleet ==
| ON | Name | Built | In service | Station | Comments |
|---|---|---|---|---|---|
| 231 | Duke of Northumberland | 1889 | 1890–1892 | Harwich No.2 | (Note: 50-foot (15 m) steam lifeboat, from RNLI funds, built in 1889 by R & H Green, Blackwall, costing £5,000. Water-Jet. 9 knots.) Sold 1923. Destroyed outside Ready-mix Concrete, Terrence Road, Widnes in 1980s. Limited remains existed, May 2014 |
| 231 | Duke of Northumberland | 1889 | 1892–1893 | Holyhead No.3 | Sold 1923. Destroyed outside Ready-mix Concrete, Terrence Road, Widnes in 1980s. Limited remains existed, May 2014 |
| 231 | Duke of Northumberland | 1889 | 1893–1897 | New Brighton No.2 | Sold 1923. Destroyed outside Ready-mix Concrete, Terrence Road, Widnes in 1980s. Limited remains existed, May 2014 |
| 231 | Duke of Northumberland | 1889 | 1897–1922 | Holyhead | Sold 1923. Destroyed outside Ready-mix Concrete, Terrence Road, Widnes in 1980s. Limited remains existed, May 2014 |
| 362 | City of Glasgow | 1894 | 1894–1897 | Harwich No.2 | (Note: 53-foot (16 m) steam lifeboat, gift of the City of Glasgow LB fund, built in 1894 by R & H Green, Blackwall, costing £2,640. Water Jet.) Sold 1901. Last recorded in Harwich. |
| 362 | City of Glasgow | 1894 | 1897–1898 | Gorleston No.4 | Sold 1901. Last recorded in Harwich. |
| 362 | City of Glasgow | 1894 | 1898–1901 | Harwich No.2 | Sold 1901. Last recorded in Harwich. |
| 404 | Queen | 1897 | 1897–1923 | New Brighton No.2 | (Note: 55-foot (17 m) steam lifeboat, from RNLI funds, built in 1897 by Thorneycroft of Chiswick, costing £5,145. 30tons GRT, 200iHP, Water-Jet.); Named to commemorate the Diamond Jubilee of Queen Victoria. Sold 1924. Renamed Robert Hughes, last recorded as an unaltered pilot tender at Lagos, Nigeria, 1970 |
| 420 | James Stevens No.3 | 1898 | 1898–1903 | Grimsby No.2 | (Note: 56-foot (17 m) steam lifeboat, legacy of Mr J. Stevens of Birmingham, built in 1898 by J. Samuel White of Cowes. 57 tons GRT, 220ihp, Propeller, costing £3,298.) Sold 1929. Renamed Helga, lost off Porthdinllaen in 1935 |
| 420 | James Stevens No.3 | 1898 | 1903–1908 | Gorleston No.4 | Sold 1929. Renamed Helga, lost off Porthdinllaen in 1935 |
| 420 | James Stevens No.3 | 1898 | 1908–1915 | Angle | Sold 1929. Renamed Helga, lost off Porthdinllaen in 1935 |
| 420 | James Stevens No.3 | 1898 | 1915–1919 | Totland Bay | Sold 1929. Renamed Helga, lost off Porthdinllaen in 1935 |
| 420 | James Stevens No.3 | 1898 | 1919–1922 | Dover | Sold 1929. Renamed Helga, lost off Porthdinllaen in 1935 |
| 420 | James Stevens No.3 | 1898 | 1922–1928 | Holyhead | Sold 1929. Renamed Helga, lost off Porthdinllaen in 1935 |
| 421 | James Stevens No.4 | 1899 | 1899–1900 | Padstow (Harbour) | (Note: 56-foot (17 m) steam lifeboat, legacy of Mr J. Stevens of Birmingham, built in 1898 by J. Samuel White of Cowes, costing £3,340. 57 tons GRT, 220 ihp (160 kW), Propeller.); Wrecked on service, 8 lives lost, 11 April 1900. |
| 446 | City of Glasgow | 1901 | 1901–1917 | Harwich No.2 | (Note: 56-foot-6-inch (17.22 m) steam lifeboat, gift of the City of Glasgow LB fund, built in 1901 by J. Samuel White of Cowes, costing £4,191. 57 tons GRT, 220 ihp, Propeller.) Sold 1917. Renamed Partick with the Admiralty. Disposed 1920. |
| 478 | Helen Peele | 1901 | 1901–1929 | Padstow (Harbour) | (Note: 95-foot-6-inch (29.11 m) steam tug, legacy of Mr C. J. Peele, built in 1901 by Ramage & Ferguson of Leith, cost unknown. 133 tons GRT, Twin two-cylinder compound steam engine (11 x 15 inch and 22 x 15in) 55 nhp, two screws.) Sold 1929. Last reported as a yacht tender on the River Clyde, March 1964. |

== See also ==
- List of RNLI stations
- List of former RNLI stations
- Royal National Lifeboat Institution lifeboats
