= Harwich Lifeboat Station =

RNLI lifeboat station in Essex, England

- Harwich Lifeboat Station in 2018

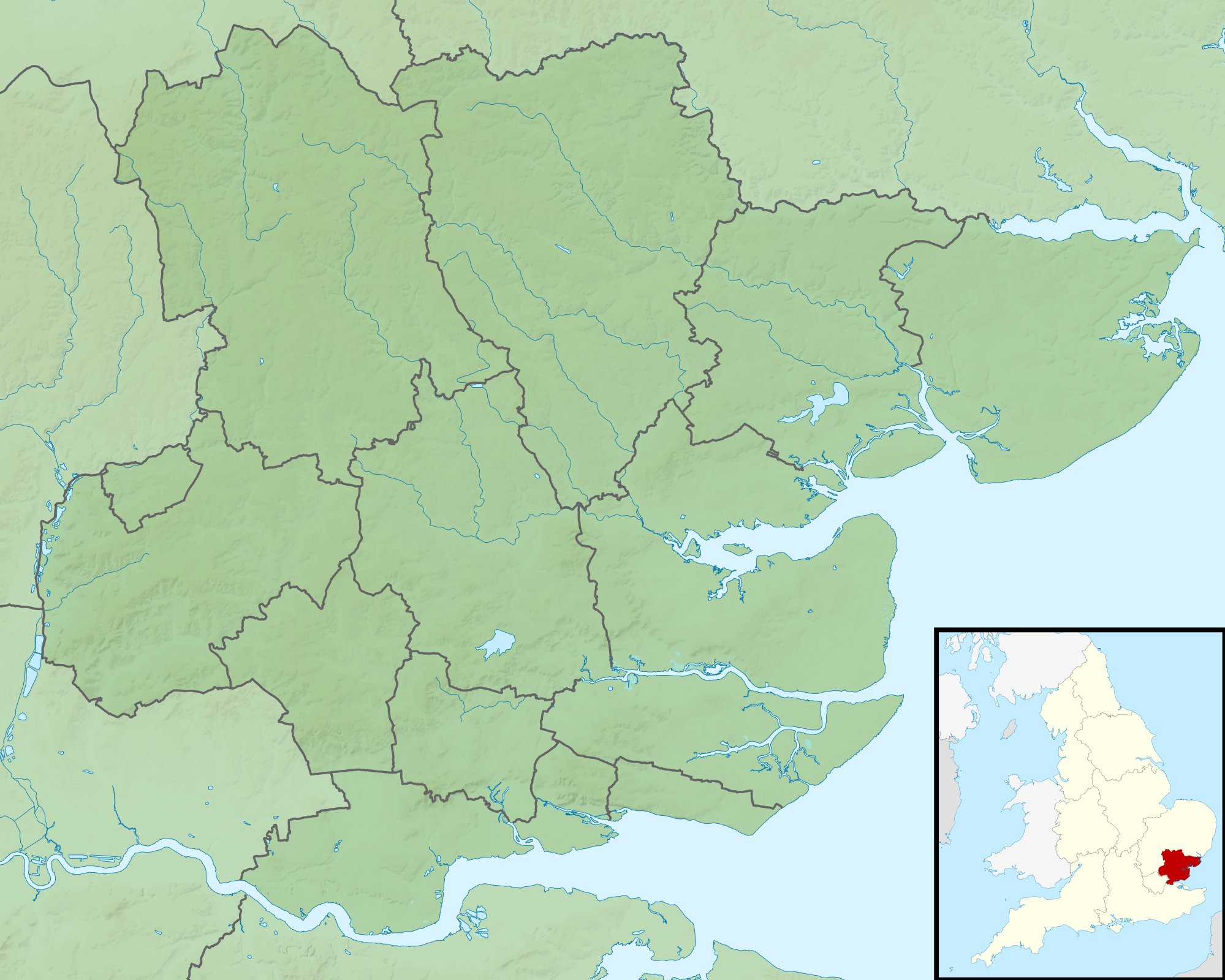
- Location within Essex

General information
- Type: RNLI Lifeboat Station
- Location: Harwich Lifeboat Station, The Quay, Harwich, Essex, CO12 3HH, England
- Coordinates: 51°56′55.01″N 1°17′13.56″E
- Opened: 1821–1826; 1878–1917; 1965–present
- Owner: Royal National Lifeboat Institution

Website
- Harwich RNLI lifeboat station

Harwich Lifeboat Station is located at The Quay, at the northern tip of the Harwich peninsula, which sits on the southern side of the confluence of the River Stour and the River Orwell, on the coast of Essex.

A lifeboat station was established at Harwich in 1821, by the Essex Lifeboat Association, but had closed by 1826. The station was re-established by the Royal National Lifeboat Institution (RNLI) station in 1878, operating until 1917. The station was re-established for a second time in 1965, initially as an Inshore lifeboat station, but operating an All-weather lifeboat from 1967.

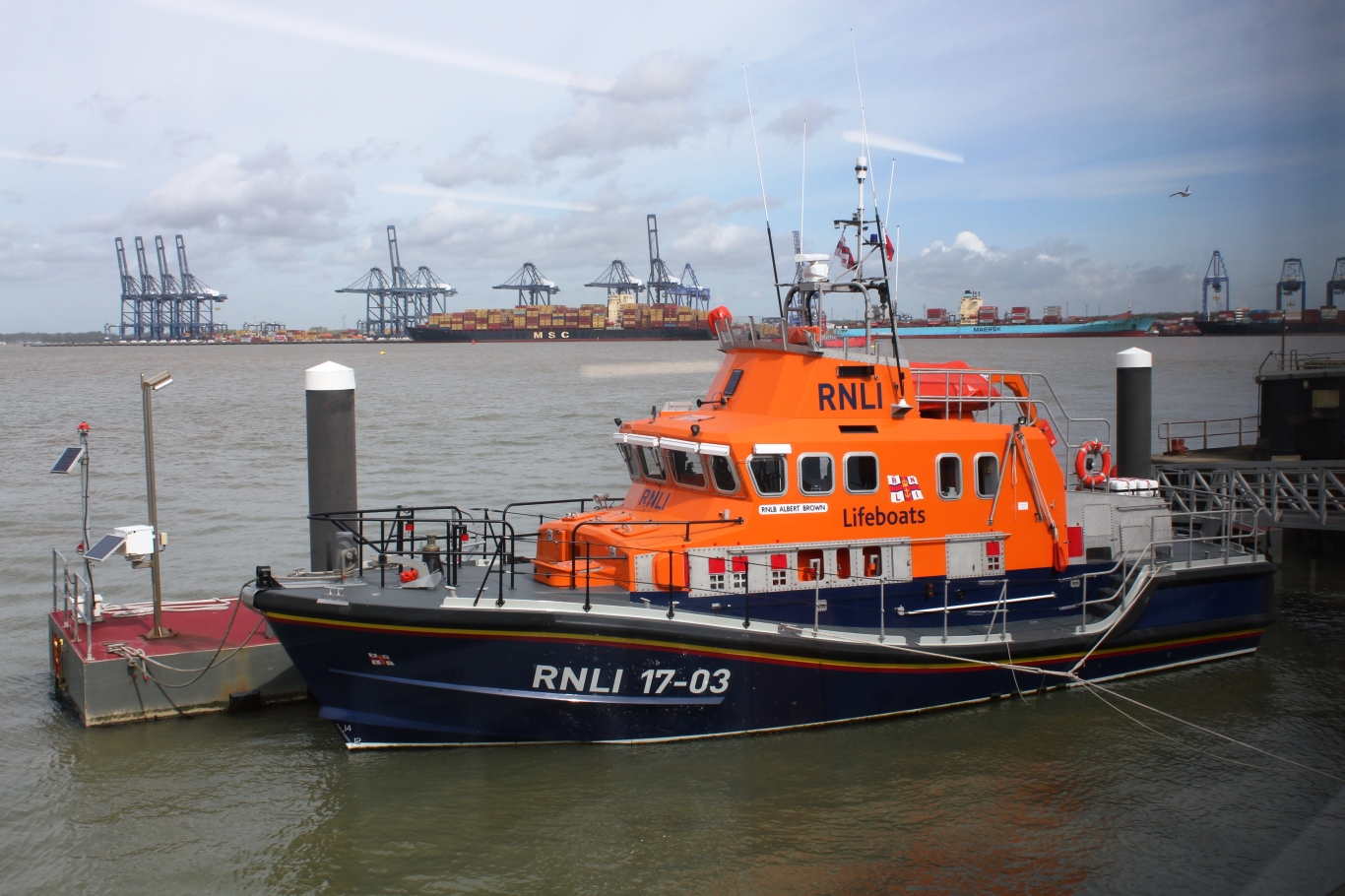
Severn-class All-weather lifeboat 17-03 Albert Brown (ON 1202)

The station currently operates the Severn-class All-weather lifeboat 17-03 Albert Brown (ON 1202), on station since 1996, and the B-class (Atlantic 85) Inshore lifeboat Tierney Harvey & Sonny Reid (B-907), on station since 2018.

== History ==
=== 1821: first station ===
A lifeboat was first stationed at Harwich in 1821, and was named Braybrooke, in honour of Richard Griffin, 2nd Baron Braybrooke, Lord Lieutenant of Essex. The lifeboat was financed by the Essex Lifeboat Association, but no funds were available for a boathouse, so the Braybrooke was moored in the harbour. On the Suffolk side of the estuary at Landguard Fort, there was a second lifeboat, the Orwell, which was eventually sold and converted to a yacht. The Harwich lifeboat had ceased operations by 1826, and the Braybrooke was sold.

=== 1875–1917: second station ===
Following the wreck of the passenger steamship SS Deutschland on Kentish Knock on 6 December 1875, local appetite for a Harwich lifeboat was much increased. No time was wasted. On 6 January 1876, just one month after the loss of the Deutschland, and following a visit to Harwich by the RNLI Inspector of Lifeboats, a meeting of the RNLI committee of management resolved to establish a station at Harwich. Within the month, a new 35 ft (11 m) self-righting 'Pulling and Sailing' (P&S) lifeboat was dispatched, towed from the River Thames to the station free of charge, by the steamship Lord Alfred Paget. The carriage and equipment were also freely transported by the Great Eastern Railway.

1876 Harwich Lifeboat House, now museum

On 24 February 1876, it was recorded that a lease, at a nominal annual rent, had been granted by Her Majesty's Principal Secretary of State for War, for the site at Timberfields (now on Angelgate), for a proposed lifeboat house costing £247.

Funding for the lifeboat, and its carriage and equipment, was provided by a gift from Miss Burmester of London. At a ceremony on 7 September 1876, the lifeboat was paraded through the town, the station was officially opened, and after a service by Rev S. Farman, the lifeboat was named Springwell in accordance with the donor's wishes.

The Springwell remained at Harwich from 1876 until 1881 and was credited with saving the lives of 61 people, including 23 saved from the barque Pasithea of Liverpool on 16 February 1883.

In 1889 the RNLI obtained its first steam-powered lifeboat, the Duke of Northumberland (ON 231), which was sent to Harwich in 1890 on a trial basis. The station with Springwell became known as Harwich No. 1 station, whilst the mooring near Halfpenny Pier where the Duke of Northumberland was kept afloat, became the No. 2 station. An additional reserve lifeboat was also placed at Harwich for a short period, to be used with the Steam lifeboat, for the assessment of towing capabilities.

In 1892, the Duke of Northumberland was sent to New Brighton on Merseyside. It was replaced in 1894 by another steam lifeboat, the City of Glasgow (ON 362), which was in turn replaced by another Steam-class lifeboat, bearing the same name in 1901.

The No. 1 station lifeboat Springwell (ON 317), was scrapped in 1902, leaving just the Steam lifeboat on station. It would be 1904, before the No. 1 station received a replacement lifeboat, the 43-foot Watson-class, Ann Fawcett (ON 517). In the years leading up to World War I, Harwich was used for the testing of new motor lifeboats which were sent to other stations.

Just eight years later, in 1912, the No. 1 lifeboat was withdrawn from service, once again leaving the City of Glasgow (ON 446) as the only lifeboat on station.

By the breakout of the First World War in 1914, the City of Glasgow (ON 446) was the only lifeboat at Harwich. In 1917, the Admiralty commandeered the lifeboat for patrol duties. City of Glasgow (ON 446) never returned to service at Harwich. With a motor powered lifeboat just to the south at Walton and Frinton, and a traditional pulling and sailing lifeboat to the north at Aldeburgh, Harwich Lifeboat Station was closed.

=== 1965: a new start ===
Harwich Lifeboat Station did not reopen until 1965, when increased traffic to the Harwich ferry as well as the Port of Felixstowe across the estuary necessitated more lifeboats in the area. A 16-foot inflatable Inshore lifeboat boat was stationed for the summers of 1965 and 1966. In September 1967, a 44 ft (13 m) Waveney-class lifeboat, 44-005 Margaret Graham (ON 1004), was sent to Harwich. After a successful two-year trial period, the Margaret Graham was made a permanent fixture at Harwich, where she remained until being replaced by the 44-020 John Fison (ON 1060) in 1980.

The most notable incident attended by a Harwich station lifeboat was the European Gateway incident of 19 December 1982. The roll-on roll-off car ferry European Gateway was leaving Felixstowe for Zeebrugge when it collided with the train ferry Speedlink Vanguard approaching Harwich Harbour. The bow of the Speedlink Vanguard struck the European Gateway amidship, and she quickly capsized to the point where only half the starboard side of the vessel was above the water. Numerous lifeboats and tugs responded to the scene and began rescuing passengers from the European Gateway within minutes. The Speedlink Vanguard launched her own lifeboat to assist. Within an hour all passengers but six had been rescued. By the time the John Fison arrived, all that remained was to search for the bodies. The John Fison recovered two bodies, three others were located by other boats, and one remained unaccounted for.

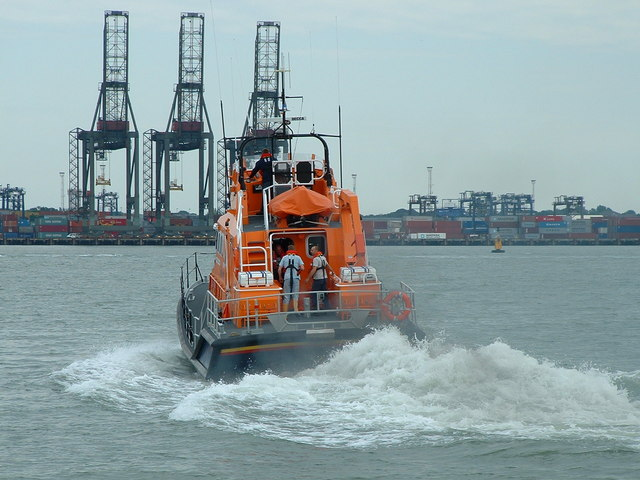
Harwich Severn-class lifeboat 17-03 Albert Brown (ON 1202)

In 1997, Harwich received 17-03 Albert Brown (ON 1202), a Severn-class fast lifeboat built by Green Marine in 1995. She is 17 meters long, 5.5 meters wide with a depth of 1.38 meters, with a top speed of 25 knots (46 km/h; 29 mph) and a range of 250 nautical miles (460 km; 290 mi). The Albert Brown was financed with bequest from Victoria Brown in memory of her late husband Albert Brown, and was formally named by Sir Terry Waite CBE on 25 May 1997.

In 2002, Harwich acquired the second generation B-class (Atlantic 75) rigid inflatable boat (RIB) Sure and Steadfast (B-789). She was named on 18 May 2003, after the motto of the Boys' Brigade in recognition of the fund raising efforts for the RNLI by that organization.

In 2003, funds were secured for a new boathouse and facilities, at a cost of £1.25 million.

On 21 May 2018, the new Atlantic 85-class lifeboat Tierney Harvey & Sonny Reid (B-907) arrived in the town to a warm welcome from crowds and supporters. She was funded by The John & Elizabeth Memorial Trust, which was set up in 1998.

The station serves a particularly busy section of coastline with Harwich being a very busy ferry terminal, with the Port of Felixstowe, the United Kingdom's busiest container port, just across the estuary.

== Harwich lifeboat museum ==
The 1876 boathouse at Timberfields was opened by the Harwich Society as a lifeboat museum in 1994. The centrepiece is Oakley-class motor lifeboat Valentine Wyndham Quinn (ON 985), which was stationed at Clacton-on-Sea from 1968 until 1983. After further service at Clogherhead in Ireland, it was first displayed at Cromer. Being rather larger than the 'pulling and sailing' lifeboat that the building had been designed for, the lifeboat had to be partly dismantled to fit through the doors.

== Station honours ==
The following are awards made at Harwich:

- RNIPLS Silver Medal
  Samuel Wordley, Master of the smack Samuel – 1829
  William Mudd, Master of the smack Lively– 1829
  William Jennings, Master of the smack Spy – 1832
- RNLI Silver Medal
  William Newson, Master of the smack Alfred – 1855
  William Lewis, Master of the smack Tryall – 1856
  Thomas King, Master of the smack Paragon – 1862
  Thomas Adams, Master Mariner – 1862
  Henry Bacon – 1862
  Benjamin Lambeth – 1862
  John Lambert – 1862
  Robert Scarlett – 1862
  George Wyatt – 1862
  (all of the smack Volunteer)
  John Carrington, Master of the Steam Tug Liverpool – 1876
  William Britton, Second Coxswain – 1881
  Capt. St Vincent Nepean RN, the Institution's District Inspector – 1881
  William Tyrrell, Coxswain – 1893
- RNLI Bronze Medal
  Petty Officer Kenneth Verdun Lee, Coxswain – 1983
  Seaman Barry James Warner – 1983
  (of the Trinity House pilot vessel Valour)
  Second Officer Michael Anthony Wright – 1983
  Seaman Thomas Edward Wakelin – 1983
  (of the Trinity House pilot vessel Patrol)
- 'A Framed Letter of Thanks signed by the Chairman of the Institution'
  R. Ramplin, Helm – 1981
  P. Dawson, crew member – 1981
  P. Brand, crew member – 1981
  Capt. J. Lukes – 1983
  A. Taylor – 1983
  D. Webb – 1983
  (of the tugs Sauria, Alfred and Ganges)
  George Lawn, lorry driver – 1983
  P. Burwood, Coxswain Mechanic – 1985
  L. Smith, Second Coxswain – 1985
  K. Brand, crew member – 1985
  D. Gilders, crew member – 1985
  E. Clifton, crew member – 1985
  D. Gilders, Second Coxswain Assistant Mechanic – 1987
  K. Brand, Emergency Mechanic – 1987
  P. Dawson, crew member – 1987
  P. Smith, crew member – 1987
  R. Barton, crew member – 1987
  Capt. R. Shaw, Honorary Secretary, crew member – 1987
  H. Bell, Branch Chairman, crew member – 1987
  Paul Smith, Second Coxswain – 2001
- 'A Letter of Thanks signed by the Deputy Director of the Institution'
  Masters of the tug Gray Delta – 1983
  Masters of the tug Gary Gray – 1983
  Capt. H. H. McGibney of the European Gateway – 1983
- 11 Medals, awarded by The Hospitaliers Sauveteurs Bretons
  Coxswain and crew of the steam lifeboat – 1908
- Member, Order of the British Empire (MBE)
  Ruth Clarke – 2003QBH
  Capt. Roderick Willis Shaw, Honorary Lifeboat Operations Manager – 2013QBH

== Roll of honour ==
In memory of those lost whilst serving at Harwich:

- Died attempting to save the crew of the schooner Alvidia, 13 February 1869
  George Wyatt, Master of the fishing smack Alfred
- Drowned when the lifeboat Springwell capsized, 18 January 1881.
  William Wink (53)

== Harwich lifeboats ==
=== Essex Lifeboat Association ===
Name	Built	On station	Class	Comments
Braybrooke	1821	1821−1826	Norfolk and Suffolk	(Note: Norfolk and Suffolk-class non-self-righting lifeboat of unknown dimensions, funded by County subscription and Lloyd's of London, built by Geo. Graham of Harwich.); Sold in 1826.

=== Harwich No.1 Station ===
ON (Note: ON is the RNLI's Official Number of the boat.)	Name	Built	On station	Class	Comments
Pre-611	Springwell	1876	1876−1881	35-foot self-righting (P&S)	(Note: 35 ft 0 in (10.67 m) x 9 ft 0 in (2.74 m) (10-oared) self-righting (P&S) lifeboat, gift of Miss E. Burmester of London, built by Woolfe of Shadwell, London, costing £433.); Returned to London in 1881.
317	Springwell	1881	1881−1902	45-foot self-righting (P&S)	(Note: 45 ft 0 in (13.72 m) x 11 ft 0 in (3.35 m) (12-oared) self-righting (P&S) lifeboat, gift of Miss E. Burmester of Regents Park, built by Woolfe of Shadwell, London, costing £600.); Broken up in 1902.
517	Ann Fawcett	1904	1904−1912	43-foot Watson (P&S)	(Note: 43 ft 0 in (13.11 m) x 12 ft 6 in (3.81 m) (10-oared) Watson-class non-self-righting (P&S) lifeboat, legacy of Mrs A. Fawcett, built by Thames Ironworks of Blackwall, London, costing £1,711.); Transferred to Kingstown.

Station closed, 1912
Pre ON numbers are unofficial numbers used by the Lifeboat Enthusiasts' Society to reference early lifeboats not included on the official RNLI list.

=== Harwich No.2 lifeboat station ===
ON	Name	Built	On station	Class	Comments
206	Reserve No.3	1890	1890−1891	38-foot 2in self-righting (P&S)	(Note: 38 ft 2 in (11.63 m) x 9 ft 0 in (2.74 m) (12-oared) self-righting lifeboat, funded by the RNLI, built by Livie of Dundee, costing £451.); Transferred to Grimsby and renamed Manchester Unity.
231	Duke of Northumberland	1889	1890−1892	Steam	Transferred to Holyhead.
362	City of Glasgow	1894	1894−1897	Steam	Temporarily transferred to Gorleston
362	City of Glasgow	1894	1898−1901	Steam	
446	City of Glasgow	1901	1901−1917	Steam	

Station closed, 1917
More post-service details can be found on the respective lifeboat class pages.

=== All-weather lifeboats ===
ON	Op.No. (Note: Op.No. is the RNLI's Operational Number of the boat carried on the hull.)	Name	On station	Class	Comments
1004	44-005	Margaret Graham	1967−1980	Waveney	Transferred to the Relief fleet. Later at Amble.
1060	44-020	John Fison	1980−1996	Waveney	Transferred to the Relief fleet.
1202	17-03	Albert Brown	1996−	Severn	

More post-service details can be found on the respective lifeboat class pages.

=== Inshore lifeboats ===
==== D class ====
Op.No.	Name	On station	Class	Comments
D-71	Unnamed	1965−1970	D-class (RFD PB16)	
D-14	Unnamed	1968	D-class (RFD PB16)	
D-201	Unnamed	1971	D-class (Avon S650)	
D-201	Unnamed	1973	D-class (Avon S650)	
D-206	Unnamed	1974−1975	D-class (Zodiac III)	
D-240	Unnamed	1976−1978	D-class (Zodiac III)	
D-225	Unnamed	1977−1978	D-class (Zodiac III)	

==== B class ====
Op.No.	Name	On station	Class	Comments
B-526	Unnamed	1978−1987	B-class (Atlantic 75)	
B-571	British Diver II	1987−2002	B-class (Atlantic 75)	
B-789	Sure and Steadfast	2002−2018	B-class (Atlantic 75)	
B-907	Tierney Harvey & Sonny Reid	2018−	B-class (Atlantic 85)	

== See also ==
- List of RNLI stations
- List of former RNLI stations
- Royal National Lifeboat Institution lifeboats
- Felixstowe Lifeboat

== Sources ==
- Leonard, Richie; Denton, Tony (2025). Lifeboat Enthusiasts Handbook 2025. Lifeboats Enthusiasts' Society.
- Leonard, Richie; Denton, Tony (2026). Lifeboat Enthusiasts Handbook 2026. Lifeboats Enthusiasts' Society.
- Farr, Grahame; Morris, Jeff (1992). List of British Lifeboats Part 1 & 2 (Second ed.). Lifeboat Enthusiasts' Society.
