= Landguard Fort Lifeboat =

The Landguard Fort Lifeboat was lifeboat stationed on the northern side of Harwich harbour during two periods between 1821 and 1864.

== Ipswich Lifeboat Association (1821 to 1826) ==
The first lifeboat at Landguard was an example of early attempts to design an unsinkable vessel. Several years before the foundation of the RNLI, Richard Hall Gower had been addressing the special problems of lifeboat design. Bayleys at Ipswich built one to his design, being paid for by public subscription initiated by Admiral Page. They launched her from the yard near Stoke Bridge in April 1821 and thoroughly tested her on the Orwell. She took station at Landguard Fort, South of Felixstowe. There is a plan of this vessel in Gower's "Original Observations".

It had a long flat floor, flared out to project at both head and stern and was steered by a long sweep over the stern. Fourteen copper-clad water-tight cases, five on each side and four down the mid line provided buoyancy. Oars and two foul-weather sprit-sails provided propulsion and there was provision for self-draining when she was fully waterlogged. About 30' overall and 7' breadth, she was capable of supporting 25 men even when flooded. Her normal crew was six oarsmen and a coxswain. Gower remarked very emphatically that a coxswain should be in constant charge of her; for without such an experienced man, she would be almost useless.

It was operated by the Ipswich Lifeboat Association until 1826 when it was withdrawn.

== Admiralty (1845 to 1864) ==
The Admiralty stationed a new lifeboat at Landguard in 1845. It was a 'paddle-box' design built by Thompson of Rotherhithe. The Admiralty lifeboat was discontinued in 1864.

== See also ==
- Felixstowe Lifeboat
- Harwich Lifeboat Station
