= Clacton-on-Sea Lifeboat Station =

RNLI Lifeboat station in Essex, England

- Clacton-on-Sea Lifeboat Station in 2025

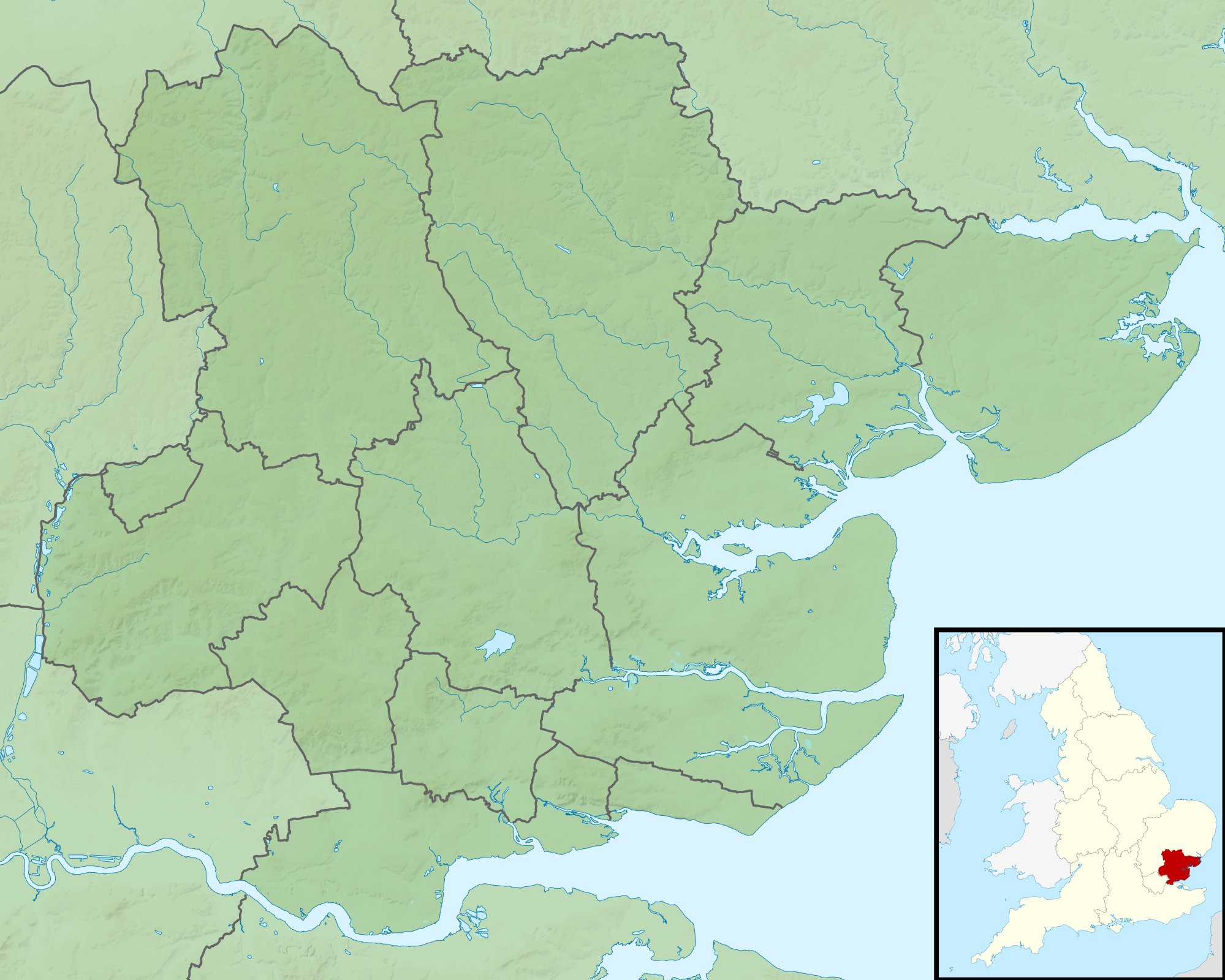
- Location within Essex

General information
- Type: Lifeboat Station
- Location: Hastings Avenue,, Clacton-on-Sea, Essex, CO15 1BW, England
- Coordinates: 51°46′53.3″N 1°08′28.6″E
- Opened: 1878
- Owner: Royal National Lifeboat Institution

Website
- Clacton-on-Sea RNLI lifeboat station

Clacton-on-Sea Lifeboat Station is located on Hastings Avenue, in the seaside town of Clacton-on-Sea, on the Tendring peninsular, in the county of Essex.

A lifeboat was first stationed at Clacton-on-Sea by the Royal National Lifeboat Institution (RNLI) in 1878.

Shannon-class All-weather lifeboat, 13-52 Chris and Jo West (ON 1359)

The station currently operates a Shannon-class All-weather lifeboat, 13-52 Chris and Jo West (ON 1359), on station since 2025, and a D-class (IB1) Inshore lifeboat, Damar's Pride (D-849), on station since 2020.

== History ==
In 1870, the hamlet of Clacton Beach had a population of just 12. Just 10 years later, following rapid development to create a Victorian seaside resort, the population was over 1300. It was during this time of expansion that the commander of HM Coastguard at Harwich wrote to the RNLI in 1877, to suggest a lifeboat be placed at Clacton-on-Sea, which was duly agreed.

On 6 September 1877, a meeting of the RNLI committee of management reported the "munificent" contribution of £4000 from the United Grand Lodge of Freemasons of England for the establishment of two lifeboat stations, to be maintained in perpetuity, in commemoration of the safe return from India, of the Most Worshipful Grand Master, H.R.H. Albert Edward, Prince of Wales. The two stations to be opened, would be at Clacton-on-Sea and Hope Cove. The new boat for Clacton would be named Albert Edward after the Prince, whilst the Hope Cove lifeboat would take the name of his wife, Alexander. Thanks were formally given to the Freemasons for their generosity.

The National Lifeboat Institution has formed a Life-boat Establishment at this new and rising watering-place on the coast of Essex - the local residents being very desirous to be provided with that means of saving life from shipwreck, that part of the coast being fringed with outlying banks, and there being no other Life-boat between Harwich and the Thames.

— The Life-boat, Vol.X, Issue 110, page 400, 1 November 1878

The 1878 Clacton lifeboat house

A boathouse was soon commissioned, and constructed by Messrs A. I. E. Cauleron at the corner of Anglefield and Church Road, at a cost of £510. The RNLI would later erect a fence around the building "to keep out stray cattle".

A 34 ft (10 m) self-righting 'Pulling and Sailing' (P&S) lifeboat was built by Woolfe boat-builders, costing £363. The boat arrived in Clacton on 13 March 1878. Robert Legerton was appointed Coxswain, with Mr. Frederick Nunn appointed Honorary Secretary. In a parade including Freemasons, Mayors and Councillors in July 1878, the lifeboat was pulled to the new lifeboat house, where after the service of dedication by the Grand Chaplain of the Freemasons, the boat was duly named Albert Edward, the first of three Clacton lifeboats to carry this name.

After only four years, it was decided that a bigger boat was required at Clacton. The boathouse was extended, and to make launching easier, two slipways were constructed, one on each side of Clacton Pier. The new lifeboat was 39 feet (12 m) long, and built by Forrestt of Limehouse, London. Costing £635, she was again funded by the Freemasons of England, and also named Albert Edward (ON 32). The boat was kept in the boathouse in the summer, and on the pier during the winter months, launching down either slipway according to conditions.

The much larger 45-foot Watson-class non-self-righting lifeboat was placed at Clacton in 1901, again funded by the gift of the Freemasons of England, and again bearing the name Albert Edward (ON 463). As before, the boat was kept on the pier during the winter months, but being too large for the boathouse, the lifeboat was kept on moorings off the pier during the summer. A former lifeboat at Newburgh was provided as a boarding boat, and the boathouse at Anglefields was sold.

=== Motor power ===
Albert Edward (ON 463) was sent for a motor conversion in 1911, and would subsequently become the first motor-powered lifeboat at Clacton, arriving back on 9 September 1912. A new 40-hp 'Tylor' petrol engine now delivered a top speed of 7.63 knots (14.13 km/h; 8.78 mph).

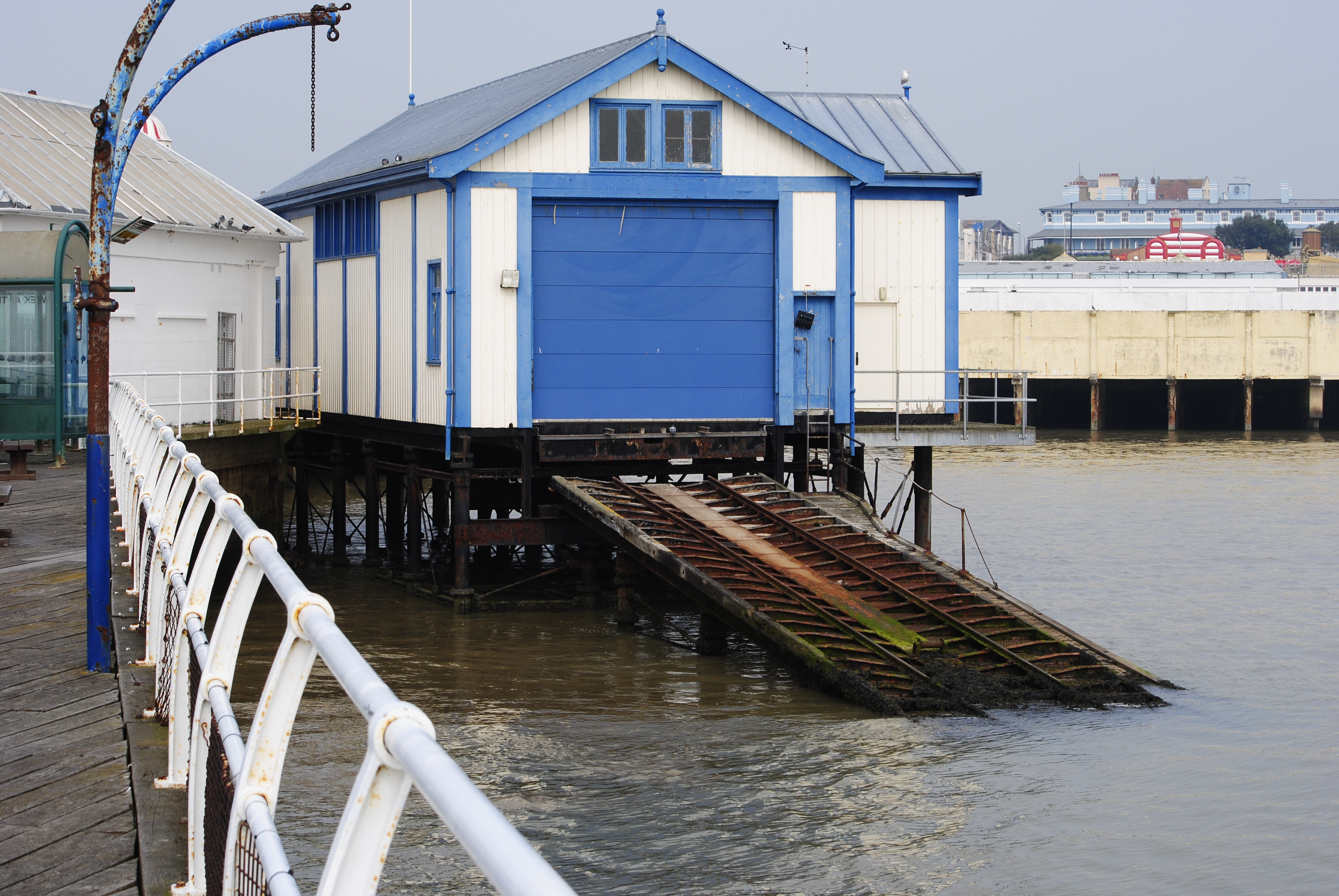
Clacton Pier Lifeboat House

In 1927, the RNLI announced that in preparation for a new lifeboat at Clacton, a new boathouse with a deep-water roller slipway would be constructed on the north side of the Pier. The new lifeboat arrived in 1929, this time a purpose-built twin-engined 45-foot 6in Watson-class motor lifeboat, Edward Z Dresden (ON 707). During this time, she would see service as one of the Little Ships of Dunkirk, and unusually, was crewed by her regular lifeboat crew for the trip. Damaged by gunfire, she was sent for repair after the Dunkirk evacuation. The lifeboat returned in August 1940, to find the centre of Clacton Pier demolished for wartime invasion preparations. With the lifeboat-house cut off, she was stationed afloat at Brightlingsea, until negotiations with the authorities allowed the bridging of the gap, and the lifeboat returned to the boathouse in November 1940. Edward Z Dresden (ON 707) would continue to serve at Clacton until 1952.

A boom in water-based leisure activities in the early 1960s brought about the deployment of small fast inshore rescue boats. Clacton received D-107, the first of their small high speed D-class (RFD PB16) Inshore Lifeboats (ILBs), in 1966. The lifeboat was soon housed in a small purpose-built boathouse on the lower promenade, built the following year.

On 12 July 1983, the Oakley-class All-weather lifeboat, 37-18 Valentine Wyndham-Quin (ON 985), was sent for urgent repairs. She would never return to Clacton. Her placed was filled temporarily by the 42-foot Watson Duke of Montrose (ON 934). Not suitable for the boathouse, the lifeboat was moored at Brightlingsea. However, this prompted a decision by the RNLI to address the issue of silting around the pier and the launching difficulties being encountered. It was decided to withdraw the All-weather lifeboat permanently, and place on service the twin-engined B-class (Atlantic 21), Guide Friendship 1 (B-514), which would continue to use the pier boathouse, and launch down the slipway from a trolley. The All-weather lifeboat was withdrawn on 10 August 1984.

=== 2006 onwards ===
The old lifeboat house on Clacton Pier was finally vacated in 2006, and a new boathouse was constructed at Hastings Avenue, just less than 1 mile (1.6 km) to the west of the pier. This provided up-to-date crew facilities and storage, along with housing for both Inshore lifeboats and launch tractors, and a retail souvenir outlet.

In October 2022, it was announced that the Atlantic 85 lifeboat would be withdrawn, and Clacton-on-Sea lifeboat station would once again receive an All-weather lifeboat, a new Shannon-class lifeboat, capable of 25 knots (46 km/h; 29 mph). The new boat arrived on 16 November 2024 to commence training, and went on service on 27 March 2025.

At a ceremony at 13:00 on Saturday 6 September 2025, a short service of dedication was led by Father Matthew Simpkins of St James church. The lifeboat and SLARS tractor was funded primarily from the legacy donations of Chris and Jo West, Mrs Diane Judith Foxley and Mr and Mrs Norman Bassett. After the lifeboat was formally handed to the care of the Clacton branch of the Institution, Alex West, nephew of Chris and Jo West stepped forward to pour the donors' favourite champagne onto the bow, and named the lifeboat 13-52 Chris and Jo West (ON 1359).

== Notable rescues ==
On the 23 October 1881, the Albert Edward was called to the aid of the French vessel Madeline. Having been towed to the scene by the Steamer Consett, the lifeboat set anchor, and attempted to veer down to the Madeline, with no success. When the cable was cut, the lifeboat was swept onto the deck of the casualty boat, damaging the rudder. The lifeboat finally dropped alongside the vessel, and each of the 16 crew were rescued one by one. Coxswain Robert Legerton was awarded the RNLI Silver Medal. Legerton and Second Coxswain James Cross were also to receive Gold Medals, and the remaining 11 crew receiving Silver Medals, awarded by the French Government.

On the 24th April 1914, the lifeboat Albert Edward (ON 463) was called out to the aid of Government Seaplane No.79, which was forced to ditch in the sea after engine trouble. The seaplane, subsequently towed to Harwich, was carrying the First Lord of the Admiralty, Winston Churchill.

== Station honours ==
The following are awards made at Clacton-on-Sea:

- Gold Medal, awarded by the French Government
  Robert Legerton, Coxswain – 1881
  James Cross, Second Coxswain – 1881
- RNIPLS Silver Medal
  William Wall Weekes, Master of the Fortitude – 1828
  Robert Cleave, Master of the New Union – 1830
  John Glover, Master of the Atalanta – 1843
  Stephen Hurry, Master of the New Gypsy – 1843
  John Powell, Master of the Lord Howe – 1843
- RNLI Silver Medal
  Capt. William Lewis of Tyrall – 1855
  Capt. John Lewis of Aurora’s Increase – 1855
  Samuel James Robert Legerton, Coxswain – 1881
  Samuel James Robert Legerton, Coxswain – 1884 (Second-service clasp)
  Samuel James Robert Legerton, Coxswain – 1891 (Third-service clasp)
  William Schofield, Coxswain – 1893
  Maurice Nicholls, crew member – 1894
  Robert Osborne, crew member – 1894
  John Grier, crew member – 1894
  Maurice Nicholls, crew member – 1899 (Second-service clasp)
  Robert Osborne, crew member – 1899 (Second-service clasp)
  George Grigson Snr, crew member – 1899
  George James Grigson, Coxswain – 1914
  George James Grigson, Coxswain – 1915 (Second-service clasp)
  Jesse Lord Salmon, Second Coxswain – 1915
  George James Grigson, Coxswain – 1918 (Third-service clasp)
  Charles Raymond Ellis, Coxswain – 1940
- Silver Medal, awarded by the French Government
  Each of the remaining 11 members of Clacton-on-Sea lifeboat crew – 1881
- Silver Medal, awarded by The King of Denmark
  William Schofield, Coxswain – 1894
- RNLI Bronze Medal
  Jesse Lord Salmon, Second Coxswain – 1918
  David Howard Wells, Helm – 1992
- 'The Thanks of the Institution inscribed on Vellum'
  Frank Castle, Second Coxswain – 1940
  Walter Harding, Motor Mechanic – 1940
  George Ellis, Coxswain – 1967
  Charles Bolingbroke, Coxswain – 1970
  Charles Bolingbroke, Coxswain – 1971
  Charles Bolingbroke, Coxswain – 1974
  Terry M. Bolingbroke, crew member – 1992
- Vellum Service Certificates
  Clacton-on-Sea Lifeboat Crew – 1970.
  Clacton-on-Sea Lifeboat Crew – 1974
- The Ralph Glister Award 1991
  (for the most meritorious service of the year performed by a rescue boat crew)
  David Howard Wells, Helm – 1992
  Terry Bolingbroke, crew member – 1992
  Thomas Ridley, crew member – 1992
- The Walter and Elizabeth Groombridge Award 1991
  (for the outstanding inshore lifeboat rescue of the year)
  David Howard Wells, Helm – 1992
  Terry Bolingbroke, crew member – 1992
  Thomas Ridley, crew member – 1992
- 'A Framed Letter of Thanks signed by the Chairman of the Institution'
  Clacton-on-Sea Lifeboat Crew – 1971
  Thomas Ridley, crew member – 1992

== Roll of honour ==
In memory of those lost whilst serving at Clacton-on-Sea:

- Lost when RNLB Albert Edward capsized whilst responding to distress flares, 23 January 1884
  James Cross, Second Coxswain (39)
  Thomas Cattermole (38)
- Suffered exposure whilst on service to the Norwegian vessel Bjarne on 14 January 1888, and died five days later
  Benjamin William Addis (50)
- Drowned after going aboard the barge Tam O'Shanter, which capsized without warning, 7 April 1943
  Alfred Frank Castle, Second Coxswain (58)

== Clacton-on-Sea lifeboats ==
=== Pulling and Sailing (P&S) lifeboats ===
ON (Note: ON is the RNLI's Official Number of the boat.)	Name	Built	On station	Class	Comments
Pre-632	Albert Edward	1878	1878−1884	34-foot self-righting (P&S)	(Note: 34 ft 0 in (10.36 m) x 8 ft 3 in (2.51 m) (10-oared) self-righting (P&S) lifeboat, gift of the Freemasons of England, built by Woolfe of Shadwell, London, costing £363.); Capsized in 1884 with the loss of two crew. Transferred to the Relief fleet in 1885. Condemned in 1890.
38	Heyland	1882	1884−1885	37-foot self-righting (P&S)	(Note: 37 ft 0 in (11.28 m) x 9 ft 0 in (2.74 m) (10/12-oared) self-righting (P&S) lifeboat, gift of the Heyland Memorial fund, built by Woolfe of Shadwell, London, costing £430 when new.); Previously at Palling. Transferred to Southsea.
32	Albert Edward	1885	1885−1901	39-foot self-righting (P&S)	(Note: 39 ft 0 in (11.89 m) x 9 ft 0 in (2.74 m) (12-oared) self-righting (P&S) lifeboat, gift of the Freemasons of England, built by Forrestt of Limehouse, London, costing £635.); Broken up in 1902.
463	Albert Edward	1901	1901−1911	45-foot Watson (P&S)	(Note: 45 ft 0 in (13.72 m) x 12 ft 6 in (3.81 m) (12-oared) Watson-class non-self-righting (P&S) lifeboat, gift of the Freemasons of England, built by Thames Ironworks of Blackwall, London, costing £1,890.); Motor conversion in 1912.
516	Reserve No. 9	1903	1911−1912	38-foot Liverpool (P&S)	(Note: 38 ft 0 in (11.58 m) x 10 ft 0 in (3.05 m) (10-oared) Liverpool-class non-self-righting (P&S) lifeboat, fitted with two drop keels and two water ballast tanks, gift of Mrs S. C. Guthrie of Tunbridge Wells, built by Thames Ironworks of Blackwall, London, costing £1,054 when new.); Previously Charles Deere James at St Agnes, IOS.

Pre ON numbers are unofficial numbers used by the Lifeboat Enthusiasts' Society to reference early lifeboats not included on the official RNLI list.

=== Boarding boats ===
ON	Name	Built	On station	Class	Comments
255	Ellen Newman and John Bentley	1889	1901–1934	31-foot self-righting (P&S)	(Note: 31-foot x 7-foot 3in (10-oared) self-righting (P&S) lifeboat, gift of Mr J. Bentley of Camden Town, built by Forrestt of Limehouse, London, costing £310 when new.); Previously at Newburgh. Sold in 1934.

=== Motor lifeboats ===
ON	Op.No. (Note: Op.No. is the RNLI's Operational Number of the boat or vehicle carried on the hull.)	Name	Built	On station	Class	Comments
463	–	Albert Edward	1901	1912−1929	45-foot Watson	Transferred to Arranmore.
707	–	Edward Z. Dresden	1929	1929−1952	45-foot 6in Watson	Later stationed at Stronsay.
887	–	Sir Godfrey Baring	1951	1952−1968	46-foot 9in Watson	Named after Godfrey Baring, former chairman of the RNLI committee of management. Transferred to Wick.
985	37-18	Valentine Wyndham-Quin	1967	1968−1983	Oakley	Withdrawn from Clacton-on-Sea in 1983 for repairs. Later at Clogherhead. Now preserved at Harwich Lifeboat Museum.
934	–	Duke of Montrose	1956	1983−1984	42-foot Watson	Relief fleet lifeboat.
All-weather lifeboat withdrawn, 1984–2025
1359	13-52	Chris and Jo West	2024	2025–	Shannon	

More post-service details can be found on the respective lifeboat class pages.

=== Inshore lifeboats ===
==== D class ====
Op.No.	Name	On station	Type	Comments
D-107	Unnamed	1966−1978	D-class (RFD PB16)	
D-262	Clacton Round Table 3484	1978−1984	D-class (Zodiac III)	
D-302	Unnamed	1983−1992	D-class (RFD PB16)	
D-431	Veronica	1992−2000	D-class (EA16)	
D-559	Seahorse II	2000−2009	D-class (EA16)	
D-723	Damarkand IV	2009−2018	D-class (IB1)	
D-774	Arthur Hamilton	2018−2020	D-class (IB1)	Initially deployed as a relief lifeboat from 2014.
D-849	Damar's Pride	2020−	D-class (IB1)	

==== B class ====
Op.No.	Name	On station	Type	Comments
B-514	Guide Friendship 1	1984−1985	B-class (Atlantic 21)	First stationed at Aberdovey in 1974.
B-511	Co-operative No.1	1985−1989	B-class (Atlantic 21)	First stationed at Largs in 1973.
B-579	Institute of London Underwriters	1989−1997	B-class (Atlantic 21)	
B-526	Unnamed	1997−1998	B-class (Atlantic 21)	Initially deployed as a relief lifeboat in 1974.
B-744	Robert George Alexander	1998−2012	B-class (Atlantic 75)	
B-863	David Porter MPS	2012−2025	B-class (Atlantic 85)	

=== Launch and recovery tractors ===
Op.No.	Reg.No.	Type	On station	Comments
TW60Hc	DX54 UYM	Talus MB-4H Hydrostatic (Mk2)	2006–2021	
TA74	EU56 HDO	New Holland TC45DA	2006–2024	
TW18Hb	H710 RUX	Talus MB-4H Hydrostatic (Mk1.5)	2021–2025	
TA106	SF60 FBZ	New Holland B3045	2024–	
SC-T30	HF24 BWJ	SLARS (Clayton)	2024–	

== See also ==
- List of RNLI stations
- List of former RNLI stations
- Royal National Lifeboat Institution lifeboats

== Sources ==
- Leonard, Richie; Denton, Tony (2025). Lifeboat Enthusiasts Handbook 2025. Lifeboats Enthusiasts' Society.
- Leonard, Richie; Denton, Tony (2026). Lifeboat Enthusiasts Handbook 2026. Lifeboats Enthusiasts' Society.
- Farr, Grahame; Morris, Jeff (1992). List of British Lifeboats Part 1 & 2 (Second ed.). Lifeboat Enthusiasts' Society.
