= Transit (ship) =

Sailing ship

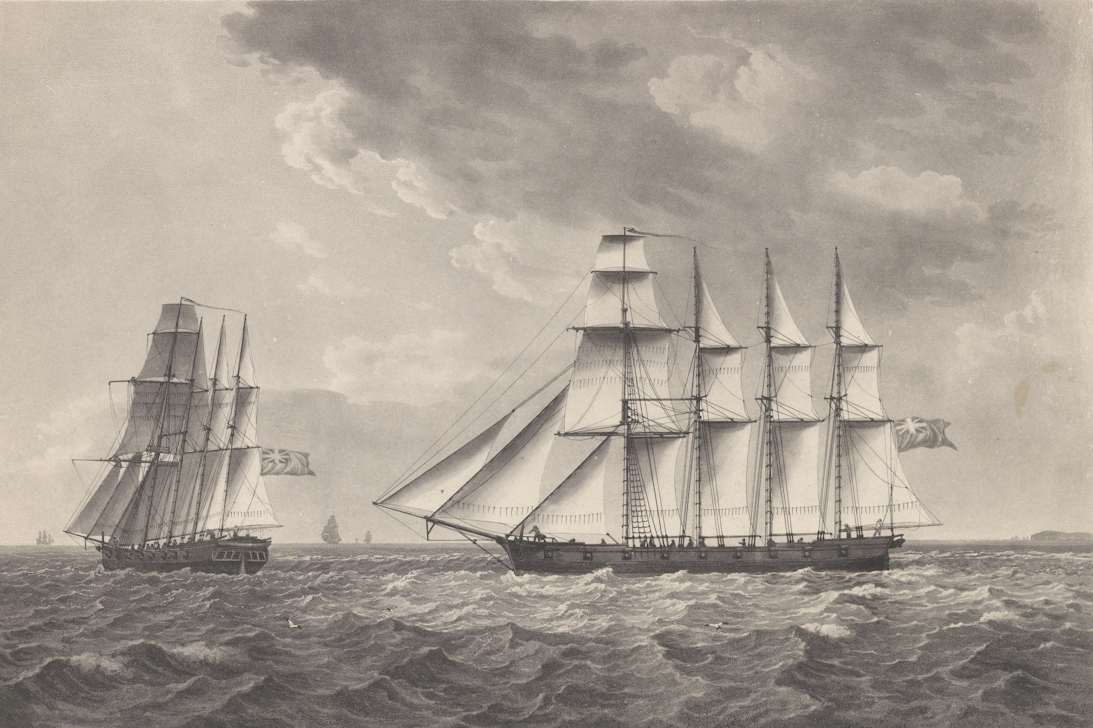
- Transit seen from two different perspectives; from an 1802 print

History

United Kingdom
- Name: Transit
- Owner: R. H. Gower
- Completed: 1800

General characteristics
- Length: 130 ft (40 m)
- Beam: 20 ft (6.1 m)

Transit was the name given to an innovative sailing ship designed for speed by Captain Richard Hall Gower and built in 1800. Gower also designed two similar ships with the same name. He hoped to have his designs adopted by the British Admiralty but failed to achieve his aim.

== Description ==
All three Transits designed by Gower had fine lines at bow and stern, uniform frames mid-ships with concave and convex sweeps and a deep keel. Their length to beam ratio was unusually high, giving them a remarkable turn of speed. The foremast was square rigged while the other three or four masts were fore-and-aft rigged, barquentine fashion but carrying very simplified standing and running rigging. Each sail was equipped with a horizontal sprit that enabled it to be brailed up to its mast and deployed rapidly. Each mast carried three sails. The topmasts could be lowered and replaced from the deck, in the event the sprits were to fail in strong gales and had to be abandoned. The Patent granted to Gower in 1799 details his theory about the relationship between speed and the length to beam ratio, as well as details of many features of his novel form of rigging, which allowed almost all activities normally conducted aloft to be performed from the deck (including the replacement of damaged masts); thus only the foremast was fitted with ratlines.

== Service history ==
At the instance of John Jervis, 1st Earl of St Vincent, the First Lord of the Admiralty, Transit was sailed against HMS Osprey in 1801. Osprey was a fast sloop of 383 tons (about twice the tonnage of Transit). Built at Northfleet like a French corvette, with an 80 ft 6 in (24.5 m) keel, she had the reputation of being very fast. Her length to beam ratio (at waterline) was probably less than 3:1. Transit with a length of 130 feet (39.6 m) and a length to beam ratio of 6.5:1 performed so well as to have been acknowledged the winner by the captain of Osprey. Despite this success Gower failed to get the support he needed to build a class of vessels to his patents.

The reasons given for the rejection of Gower's proposal included the observation that because of her deep keel she would fall over at low tide in many of the east coast ports from which she might have to operate and that the deck was so narrow that guns could not be arranged symmetrically on each side for fear of their recoil causing them to collide. By coincidence, but apparently unbeknownst to Gower, the very gun that he would have needed, the carronade, a short barrelled gun mounted on a slide fixed to the deck, was adopted by the Royal Navy less than a year before the test of Transit.

Gower wrote detailed and vivid accounts of the vessels and his experiences with the authorities. George Bayley, owner of the yard that built two of the Transits also gave an account of the vessels. Macgregor gives a description and illustration of the first Transit.
