= Felixstowe Lifeboat =

Lifeboat service in Suffolk, England

- Felixstowe Lifeboat
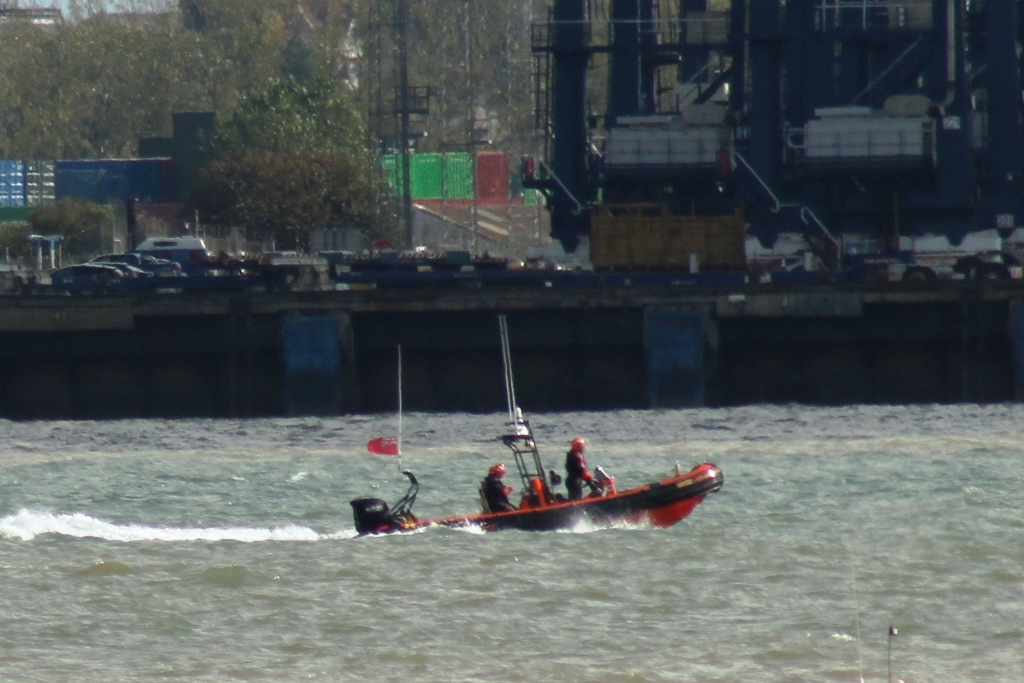
- Last Orders on patrol near the Port of Felixstowe

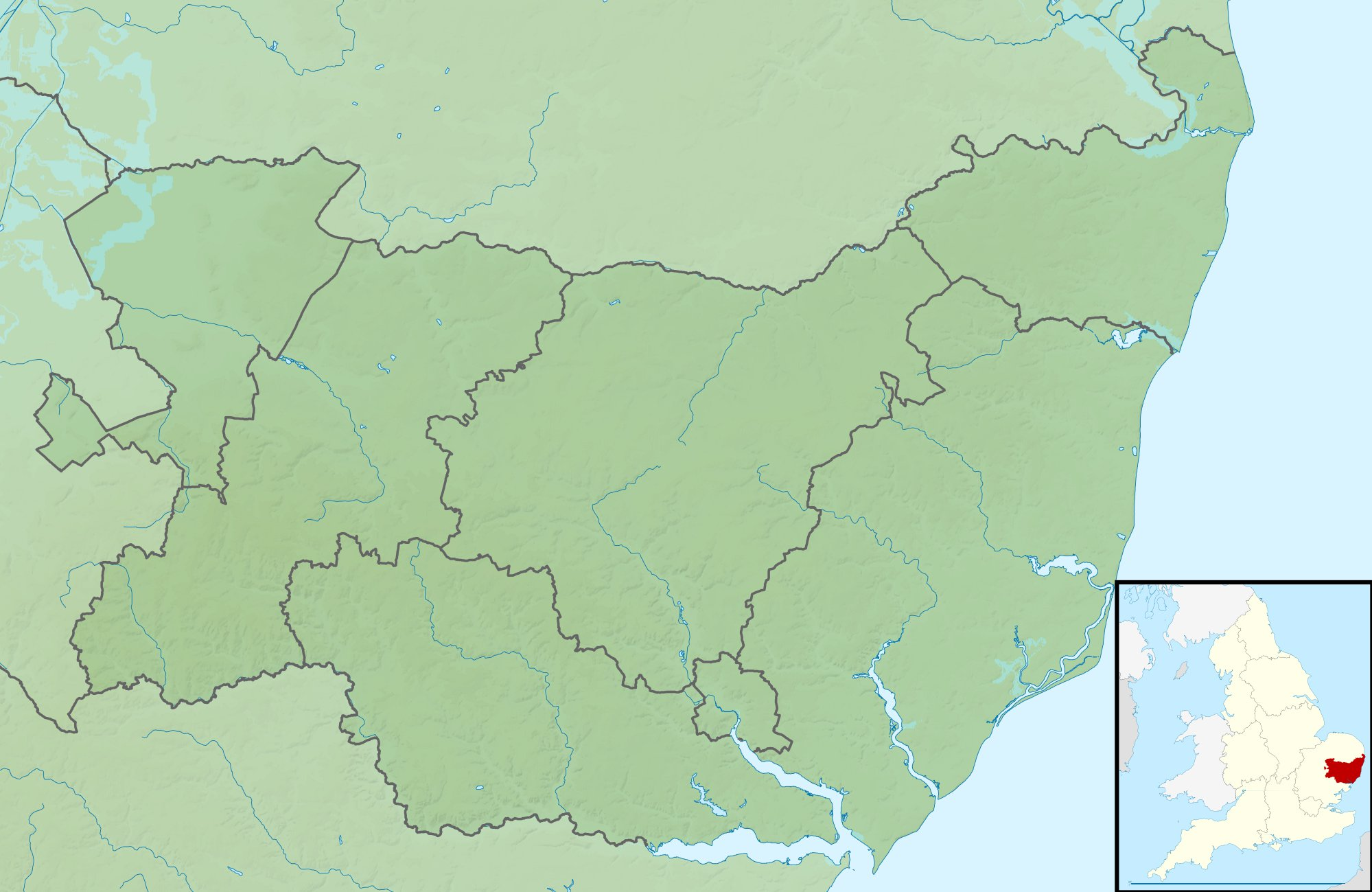
- Location within Suffolk
- Formation: 1997
- Type: Charity
- Headquarters: Searson's Farm, Cordy's Lane, Trimley St Mary, Suffolk
- Coordinates: 51.9723°N 1.3138°E
- Region served: Felixstowe
- Services: Lifeboat
- Volunteers: 36 (2025)
- Website: felixstowelifeboat.org.uk

Felixstowe Lifeboat is an independent lifeboat service operating near Felixstowe in Suffolk, England. It was established in 1997 as the Felixstowe Coast Patrol and Rescue.

== History ==
The first lifeboat in the Felixstowe area was the lifeboat at Landguard Fort in 1821. Another lifeboat was provided at Harwich (on the opposite side of the estuary) at around the same time but both had ceased operation by 1917. The Royal National Lifeboat Institution (RNLI) established a new station at Harwich in 1965.

Volunteers established the Felixstowe Coast Patrol and Rescue service in 1997, when a local Coastguard rescue boat was withdrawn. It operated independently of the RNLI. It was given a permanent base in a supermarket warehouse off Hamilton Road, Felixstowe, in 2018 (at 51.9669°N 1.3515°E). They had to vacate this in 2025 because of changes by the owners so they moved to a new base in a barn at Searson's Farm in Cordy's Lane, Trimley St Mary.

== Operations ==
The lifeboat is a 'Declared Facility Status' for the HM Coastguard so can be called out as part of the country's search and rescue framework. In 2024 they saved six lives and assisted 58 other people.

== Lifeboats ==
New	Name	Length	Type
2000	Volunteer	6.5 m (21 ft)	Humber Ocean Pro
2019	Last Orders	7.5 m (25 ft)	Humber Ocean Pro

== See also ==
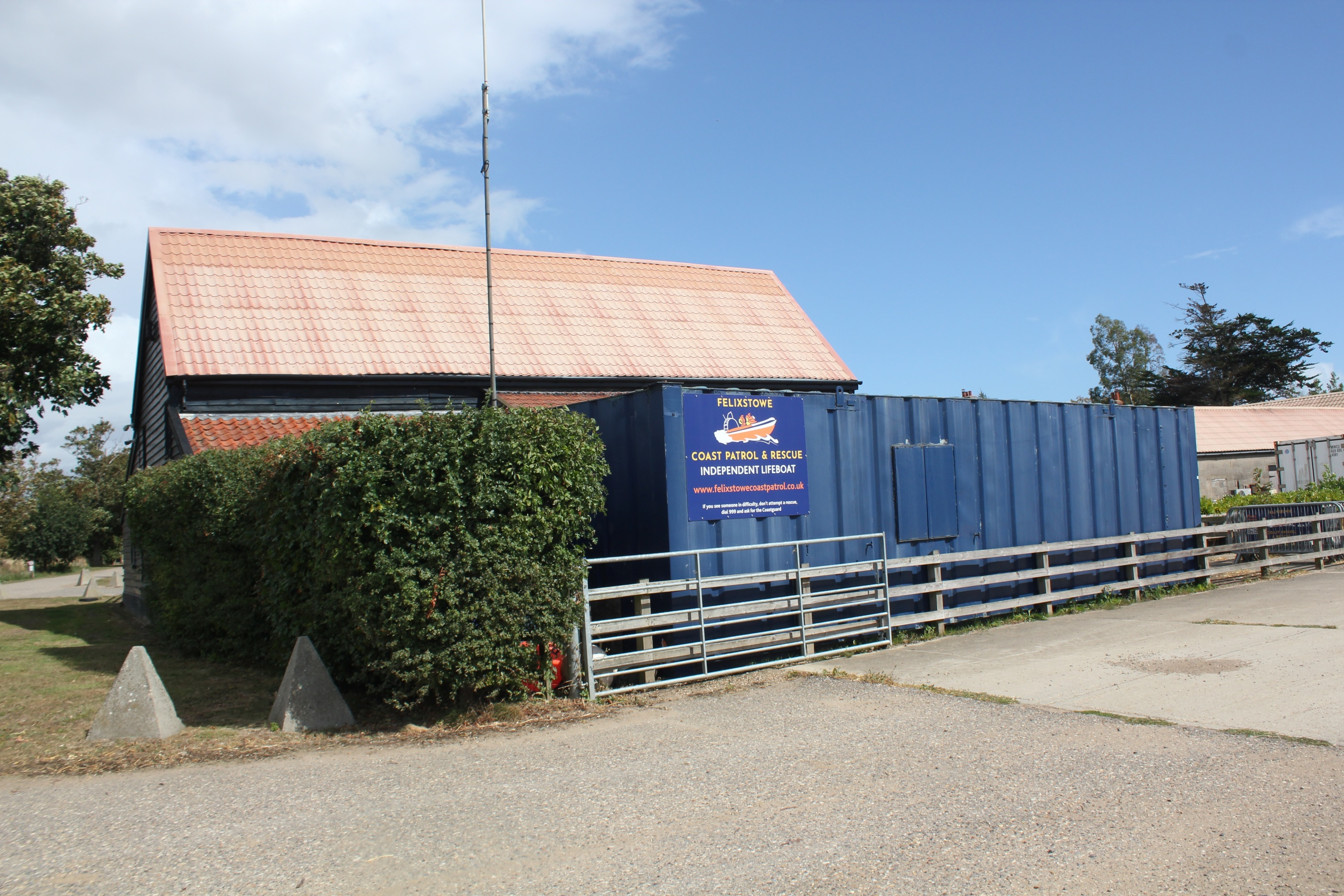
The Felixstowe Lifeboat base at Trimley

- Independent lifeboats in Britain and Ireland
