= Foote Gower =

English cleric, academic and antiquarian

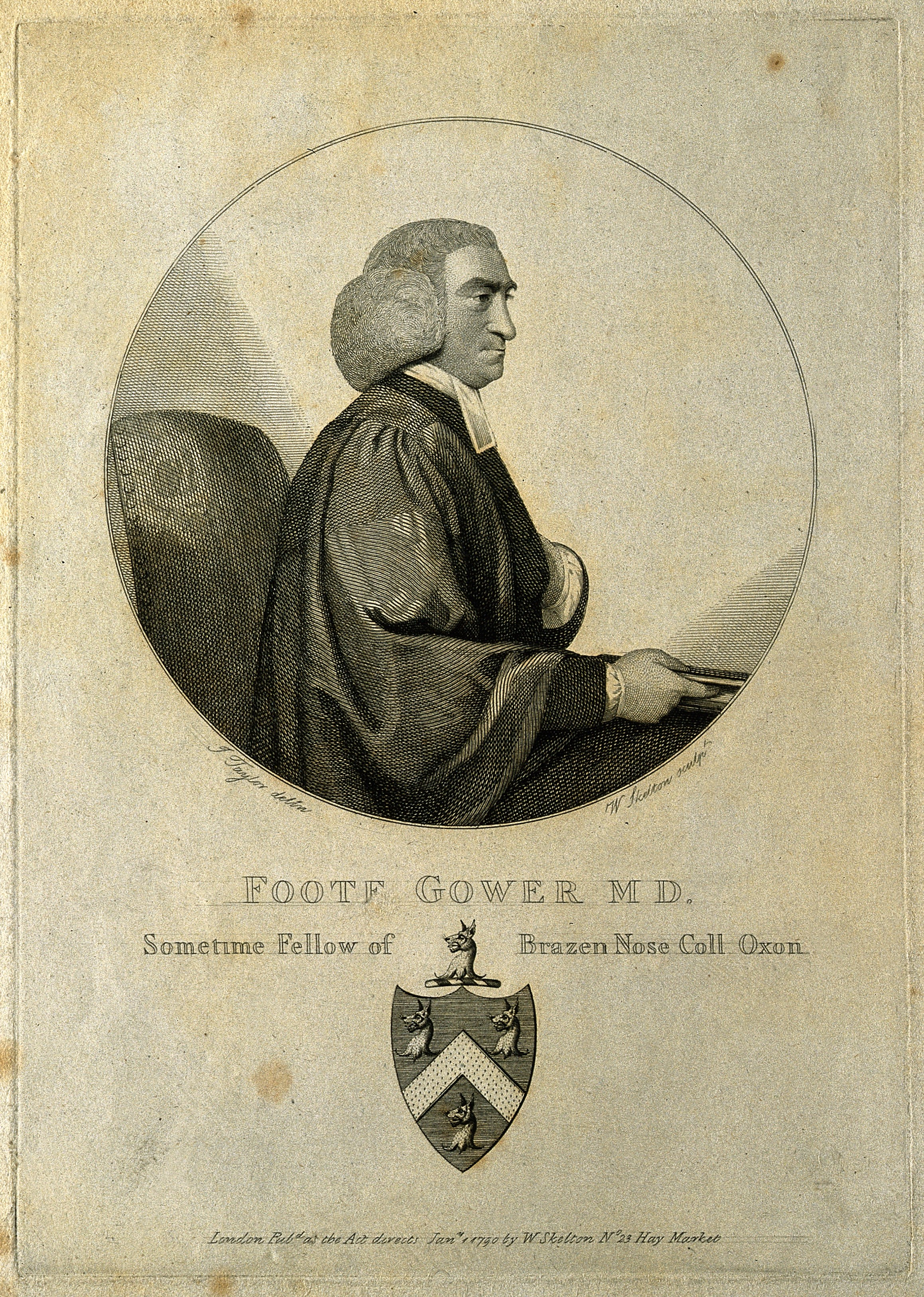
Foote Gower, engraving after John Taylor (1739–1838)

Foote Gower (1725/6–1780) was an English cleric, academic and antiquarian.

== Life ==
The son of the Rev. Foote Gower, M.A. and M.D., a physician in Chester, he was born there about 1726. He matriculated at Brasenose College, Oxford, 15 March 1744, aged 18, and took his degrees of B.A. in 1747, M.A. in 1750, M.B. in 1755, and M.D. in 1757. He was elected a Fellow of his college in 1750.

It is unclear whether Gower practised as a physician. He was rector of Chignal St James and Mashbury, near Chelmsford in Essex, from June 1761 until about 1777. He also held the living of Woodham Walter, where the patron was Thomas Fytche.

Gower employed Joseph Strutt to make engravings of Roman antiquities. He was elected a Fellow of the Society of Antiquaries of London in 1768, and had Richard Gough as a close friend. He died at Bath, Somerset on 27 May 1780.

== Works ==
Gower made collections for a history of Cheshire, and in 1771 printed an anonymous Sketch of the Materials for a new History of Cheshire, taking the form of a letter to Thomas Falconer. It was signed "a Fellow of the Antiquary Society", and reissued in 1772. He made collections also for a history of Essex, and a new edition of John Horsley's Britannia Romana.

== Legacy ==
Gower's many papers passed into the hands of Dr. Markham of Whitechapel, and subsequently the project was taken up by Dr. J. Wilkinson and William Latham, who, in 1800, republished the Sketch with additions. In the end the manuscripts were disposed of by auction, some going to the British Museum and others to the Bodleian Library.

In the longer term, Gower's work served to document the sources for Cheshire local history. George Ormerod exploited it thoroughly, having made contact with William Latham through his father-in-law John Latham (1761–1843) (not a close relation).

== Family ==
Gower married Elizabeth, a sister of John Strutt, Member of Parliament for Maldon. They had four children:

- Thomas Foote Gower (1763-1849), who became a vicar at Great Totham
- Elizabeth, who lived for many year with her brother Thomas.
- Charles Gower M.D. (died 1822) was author of Hints and Auxiliaries to Medicine,
- Richard Hall Gower (1768–1833), the naval architect.
