= D-class lifeboat (Avon S650) =

Inshore lifeboat class of the RNLI

Class overview
- Name: D-class (Avon S650)
- Builders: Avon Inflatables
- Operators: Royal National Lifeboat Institution
- Preceded by: D-class (RFD PB16)
- Succeeded by: D-class (Zodiac III)
- Built: 1971
- In service: 1971–1978
- Completed: 4
- Retired: 4

General characteristics
- Class & type: Avon S650
- Length: 16 ft 6 in (5.03 m)
- Beam: 6 ft 10 in (2.08 m)
- Propulsion: 1 × 40-hp Evinrude outboard engine
- Speed: 20 knots (23 mph; 37 km/h)
- Endurance: 3 hours at full speed
- Capacity: 10

The D-class lifeboat (Avon S650) was a sub-class of four inflatable boats operated as part of the D-class between 1971 and 1986 by the Royal National Lifeboat Institution of the United Kingdom and Ireland. It was superseded by the D-class lifeboat (Zodiac III).

== Utilization ==
For more than 60 years the D-class has served as the workhorse of the RNLI Inshore Lifeboat (ILB) fleet. The D-class is one of the few RNLI types not to feature a rigid hull. The D-class was specifically designed as a light and highly manoeuvrable rapid response craft, especially suited to close shore work.

There were only four Avon S650 boats in service with the RNLI

== Design and construction ==
The D-class lifeboat consists of two sponsons, together housing four inflatable segments intersected by baffles.

This was one of the smaller classes of lifeboat operated by the RNLI, and while there were only four Avon S650s in the fleet, the D-class were a common sight at lifeboat stations around the coast. Unlike other members of the ILB fleet, the D-class does not have a rigid hull; all others, with the exception of the Arancia, hovercraft and ALB Tenders, are Rigid Inflatable Boats (RIBs).

== Fleet ==
Op. No. (Note: Op. No. is the RNLI's Operational Number of the boat carried on the hull.)	Name	In service	Principal Station	Comments
D-200	Unnamed	1971–1976	Walmer	
D-200	Unnamed	1976–1978	Relief fleet	
D-201	Unnamed	1971	Harwich	
D-201	Unnamed	1971–1973	Relief fleet	
D-201	Unnamed	1973	Harwich	
D-221	Unnamed	1971–1973	Relief fleet	
D-222	Unnamed	1971–1973	Relief fleet	

== See also ==
- Royal National Lifeboat Institution lifeboats
