= Thomas Falconer (classical scholar, born 1738) =

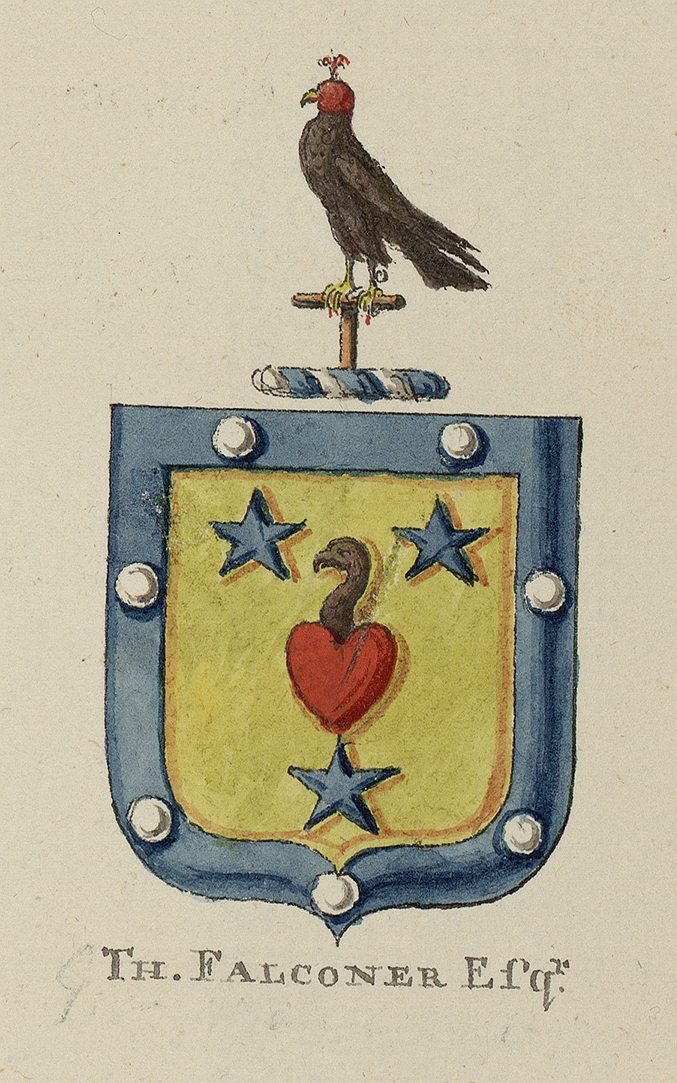
Thomas Falconer's coat of arms

Thomas Falconer (1738–1792) was an English classical scholar.

== Life ==
He was the son of William Falconer, recorder of Chester, by Elizabeth, daughter of Randle Wilbraham de Townsend. He spent some time at Brasenose College, Oxford, where he matriculated 12 March 1754; but left without taking a degree, and was called to the bar at Lincoln's Inn on 20 June 1760. With chronic ill-health, he lived a life of studious retirement at Chester.

He took an interest in antiquities, and was a patron of literature; he was called by Anna Seward the Mæcenas of Chester. It was to him that in 1771 Foote Gower addressed his open letter A Sketch of the Materials for a New History of Cheshire. He was a friend of John Reinhold Forster, who dedicated to him his translation of Baron Riedesel's Travels through Sicily, and that part of Italy formerly called Magna Græcia, London, 1773. He died on 4 September 1792, and was buried in St. Michael's Church, Chester. A monument with a laudatory inscription in St. John's Church, Chester, perpetuates his memory. He never married.

== Works ==
Falconer published ‘Devotions for the Sacrament of the Lord's Supper, by a Layman,’ London, 1786; 2nd ed. 1798. He read in 1791 before the Society of Antiquaries a paper in vindication of the accuracy of Pliny's description of the temple of Diana at Ephesus. A work by him entitled ‘Chronological Tables, beginning with the Reign of Solomon and ending with the Death of Alexander the Great,’ appeared at Oxford in 1796, edited by Frodsham Hodson. He also left materials for an edition of Strabo, which formed the basis of the edition brought out in 1807 by his nephew Thomas Falconer, M.D.

He was also the author of an ‘Ode to Sleep,’ the date of publication of which is uncertain.

== Notes ==
- Sutton, Charles William (1891). "Hodson, Frodsham" . In Lee, Sidney (ed.). Dictionary of National Biography. Vol. 27. London: Smith, Elder & Co. pp. 73, 74.

Attribution

- This article incorporates text from a publication now in the public domain: Rigg, James McMullen (1889). "Falconer, Thomas (1738-1792)". In Stephen, Leslie (ed.). Dictionary of National Biography. Vol. 18. London: Smith, Elder & Co. p. 162. This source cites:
  - Thomas Falconer's Bibliography of the Writings of the Falconer Family, with biographical notices;
  - Ormerod's Cheshire, i. 321;
  - Letters of Anna Seward, iii. 167.
