= Palling Lifeboat Station =

Former lifeboat station in Norfolk, England

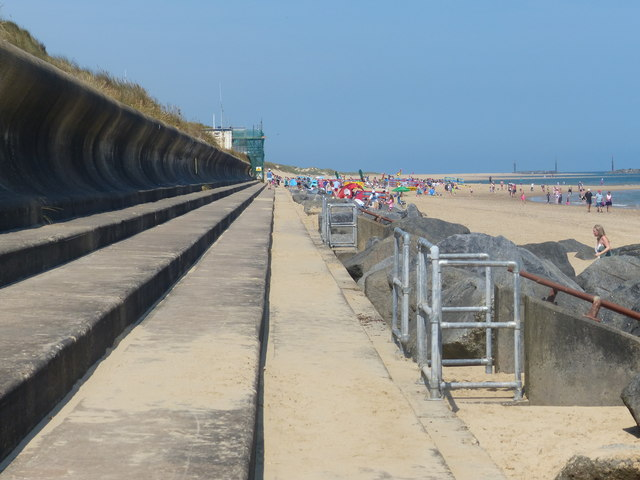
- Palling Sea Defences

- Location within Norfolk

General information
- Status: Closed
- Type: Lifeboat Station
- Location: Sea Palling, Norfolk, England
- Coordinates: 52°47′20.5″N 1°36′11.0″E
- Opened: NASLSM 1852–1858; RNLI 1858–1930; Ind. 1972–present

Palling Lifeboat Station was located in the village of Palling, on the north-east coast of Norfolk.

A lifeboat was first stationed at Palling in 1852, by the Norfolk Association for Saving the Lives of Shipwrecked Mariners (NASLSM), more commonly known as the Norfolk Shipwreck Association (NSA). Management of the station was transferred to the Royal National Lifeboat Institution (RNLI) in 1858.

After 78 years of operations, Palling RNLI Lifeboat Station closed in 1930.

The parish of "Palling" was renamed "Sea Palling" on 2 October 1948.

== History ==
A lifeboat was sent to be stationed at Palling in 1852 by the Norfolk Association for Saving the Lives of Shipwrecked Mariners. She was a 32 ft (9.8 m) Palmer-class non-self-righting lifeboat, built by Branford, of Great Yarmouth, and costing £75.

Following a meeting of the NSA on 21 Nov 1857, it was agreed to request that the RNLI take over responsibility for all their lifeboat stations, including Palling. This was formally agreed at a meeting of the RNLI committee of management on 3 December 1857.

A new lifeboat was ordered for Palling from Forrestt of Limehouse, London, a 30 ft (9.1 m) 10-oared Peake-class self-righting lifeboat, and along with her specially constructed carriage, cost just over £250. Edward Amis was appointed Coxswain. She was housed in the boathouse built by the NASLSM, and would serve Palling for six years, being launched on service six times, and saving 20 lives.

The next lifeboat to be stationed at Palling was the Parsee. Originally a 30 ft (9.1 m) lifeboat stationed at Hastings named Victoria, she was sent to the boatbuilders Forrestt in London, for conversion to be a 36 ft (11 m) 12-oared boat. A sum of £2000 was presented to the Institution by the firm of Cama and Co., Parsee merchants, for the cost of the lifeboat and carriage, and her future maintenance. The lifeboat was transported free of charge to Great Yarmouth in February 1864, by the Great Eastern Railway Company, and then sailed up to Palling by the crew. In her 18 years on service at Palling, she launched 23 times, and saved 103 lives.

On her first call on 23 December 1864, Parsee went to the aid of the schooner Idas of Nantes, on passage from Danzig to Dunkirk, when she was driven ashore at Palling. Six men were rescued.

Parsee was replaced by a new boat in 1882, the Heyland (ON 38), built by Woolfe of Shadwell. The boat was provided from funds raised in the memory of Lt. Heyland, RN, lost rescuing a seaman from HMS Minotaur. But weighing four tons, she proved too heavy for the sandy conditions at Palling, and was soon replaced by Good Hope (ON 13) in 1884; again a 37 ft (11 m) boat built by Woolfe, but weighing only three tons.

The No.2 station was closed in 1929. Motor-powered lifeboats had been placed on service at Cromer, 20 miles to the north, and Gorleston, 20 miles to the south, and it soon followed that the decision was made to also close the No.1 station. This happened on 29 October 1930, with the removal of the lifeboat Jacob and Rachel Valentine (ON 580), which was transferred to Whitby.

== 1972 onwards ==
In 1972, a rescue service was re-established at Sea Palling by local people, through monies raised from private, business and charitable donations. Today the renamed charitable Sea Palling Independent Lifeboat is in operation, covering the area between Eccles-on-Sea and Winterton-on-Sea.

== Notable rescues ==
A launch of the 54th West Norfolk Regiment in 1901

At 04:30 on the 7 Mar 1907, Palling No.1 lifeboat 54th West Norfolk Regiment (ON 471) launched to the aid of the vessel Vixen. In pitch-black gale force conditions, the lifeboat managed to rescue five crew, but one man was left clinging to the rigging; cold, and unable to climb down by himself. The Master re-boarded the Vixen along with lifeboat crewman James Pestell. Pestell then climbed the rigging, and with the assistance of the Master, brought the man to the waiting lifeboat. After two of the party transferred to the lifeboat, it was hit by a large wave, and washed away from the wreck, leaving Pestell alone on the stricken vessel. Finally, the lifeboat returned, and Pestell was taken on board. For this service, James Pestell Jr. was awarded the RNLI Silver Medal.

== Station honours ==
The following are awards made at Palling.

- RNLI Silver Medal
  Edward Amis, Coxswain – 1870
  Walter Pestell, Coxswain – 1893
  Thomas Bishop, Acting Coxswain – 1894
  Walter Pestell, Coxswain – 1899 (Second-service clasp)
  James Pestell, Jr., crew member – 1907

== Roll of honour ==
In memory of those lost whilst serving at Palling:

- Developed pneumonia following a launch on 1 March 1910 in bitterly cold conditions, and died 20 days later.
  Robert Amis, Second Coxswain (68)

== Palling lifeboats ==
=== NASLSM ===
Name	Built	On station	Class	Comments
Unnamed	1852	1852−1858	32-foot Palmer	(Note: 32 ft 0 in (9.75 m) x 9 ft 7 in (2.92 m) (10-oared) Palmer-class non-self-righting lifeboat, built by Branford of Great Yarmouth, costing £75.); Condemned in 1858

=== RNLI ===
==== Palling No.1 Station ====
ON (Note: ON is the RNLI's Official Number of the boat.)	Name	Built	On station	Class	Comments
Pre-322	Unnamed	1858	1858−1864	30-foot Peake self-righting (P&S)	(Note: 30 ft 0 in (9.14 m) x 7 ft 6 in (2.29 m) (10-oared) Peake-class self-righting (P&S) lifeboat, from RNLI funds, built by Forrestt of Limehouse, London, costing £179.); Transferred to Porthdinllaen.
Pre-314	Parsee	1857	1864−1882	36-foot self-righting (P&S)	(Note: 36 ft 0 in (10.97 m) x 8 ft 0 in (2.44 m) (12-oared) self-righting (P&S) lifeboat, gift of Cama Brothers, London & Bombay, built by Forrestt of Limehouse, London, costing £161 when new. Previously 30 ft 0 in (9.14 m) x 7 ft 6 in (2.29 m) (10-oared), lengthened 1864.); Previously Victoria at Hastings. Sold in 1882.
38	Heyland	1882	1882−1884	37-foot self-righting (P&S)	(Note: ON 38. 37 ft 0 in (11.28 m) x 9 ft 0 in (2.74 m) (12-oared) self-righting (P&S) lifeboat, gift of the Heyland Memorial Fund, built by Woolfe of Shadwell, London, costing £430.); Transferred to Clacton-on-Sea.
13	Good Hope	1884	1884−1900	37-foot self-righting (P&S)	(Note: ON 13. 37 ft 0 in (11.28 m) x 8 ft 9 in (2.67 m) (12-oared) self-righting (P&S) lifeboat, gift of Rev. W, J, Guerrier of Oxford, built by Woolfe of Shadwell, London, costing £392.); Broken up in 1900.
471	54th West Norfolk Regiment	1901	1901−1926	37-foot 6in self-righting (P&S)	(Note: ON 471. 37 ft 6 in (11.43 m) x 9 ft 3 in (2.82 m) (12-oared) self-righting (P&S) lifeboat, gift of late Maj. Lancelot Wood, built by Thames Ironworks of Blackwall, London, costing £893.); Transferred to the Relief fleet. Sold in 1931.
580	Jacob and Rachel Vallentine	1907	1926−1930	34-foot Dungeness self-righting (P&S)	(Note: ON 580. 34 ft 0 in (10.36 m) x 8 ft 0 in (2.44 m) (10-oared) Dungeness-class (Rubie) self-righting (P&S) lifeboat, legacy of Mr S. Vallentine of Brixton, built by Thames Ironworks of Blackwall, London, costing £893.); Previously at Happisburgh. Transferred to Whitby.

Station closed in 1930
Pre ON numbers are unofficial numbers used by the Lifeboat Enthusiasts' Society to reference early lifeboats not included on the official RNLI list.

==== Palling No.2 Station ====
ON	Name	Built	On station	Class	Comments
14	British Workman	1870	1870−1893	40-foot 4in Norfolk and Suffolk (P&S)	(Note: ON 14. 40 ft 4 in (12.29 m) x 11 ft 6 in (3.51 m) (14-oared) Norfolk and Suffolk-class non-self-righting (P&S) lifeboat, funded by the RNLI, built by James Beeching of Great Yarmouth, costing £273.); Sold in 1893. Renamed Water Beetle. Reverted to British Workman, but broken up at the Nat. Boat Building Centre in 1995.
351	Hearts of Oak	1893	1893−1917	40-foot Norfolk and Suffolk (P&S)	(Note: ON 351. 40 ft 0 in (12.19 m) x 12 ft 0 in (3.66 m) (14-oared) Norfolk and Suffolk-class non-self-righting (P&S) lifeboat, gift of the Hearts of Oak Benefit Society, built by Wm. T. Ellis of Lowestoft, costing £416.); Sold in 1917. Renamed Mayflower, later Valentina. Broken up at Willow Wren Wharf, Southall around 1990.
656	Hearts of Oak	1918	1918−1929	40-foot Norfolk and Suffolk (P&S)	(Note: ON 656. 40 ft 0 in (12.19 m) x 12 ft 0 in (3.66 m) (12-oared) Norfolk and Suffolk-class non-self-righting (P&S) lifeboat, gift of the Hearts of Oak Benefit Society, built by Summers & Payne of Southampton, completed by S. E. Saunders of East Cowes.); Transferred to the Relief fleet. Sold in 1934, Renamed Wander Bird. Last reported at Frontignan, France in July 2002.

Station closed in 1929

== See also ==
- List of RNLI stations
- List of former RNLI stations
- Royal National Lifeboat Institution lifeboats
