= SS Sirius =

Several steamships have borne the name Sirius:

- SS Sirius (1837) was a 703-ton passenger/cargo ship built in 1837 by Robert Menzies & Sons, Leith, Scotland. Wrecked and sunk on 16 January 1847 off Ballycotton, Ireland.
- SS Sirius (1871) was a 563-ton cargo ship launched on 29 September 1871, by Scotts Shipbuilding and Engineering Company, Greenock, Scotland. She was renamed three times, the last time Ninive in 1915. She was removed from the ship registers in 1930.
- SS Sirius (1872) was a 323-ton cargo ship built as Fredrik in 1872, by Ahlberg shipbuilders in Eckerna, Sweden. Twice renamed, the second time Sirius in 1900. Wrecked south of Libau in the Baltic on 7 March 1903
- SS Sirius (Stockholm, 1874) was a 572-ton cargo ship built in 1874, by Lindbergs shipbuilders in Stockholm, Sweden. Renamed Kong Halfdan in 1878. Wrecked north of Tromsø in Norway on 19 January 1918.
- SS Sirius (Gothenburg, 1874) was a 434-ton cargo ship launched as Alexander Keiller in August 1874, by Göteborgs Mekaniska Verkstad in Gothenburg, Sweden. Renamed twice, in 1930 as Sirius. Wrecked off Bornholm in the Baltic on 2 October 1930.
- SS Sirius (1875) was a 326-ton passenger ship launched as Newhaven in July 1875, by Société Nouvelle des Forges et Chantiers de la Méditerranée in Le Havre, France. Renamed four times, as Sirius in 1913. Scrapped in 1915.
- SS Sirius (Chester, 1881) was a 993-ton passenger ship launched on 12 May 1881 by John Roach & Sons, Chester, Pennsylvania, United States. Renamed twice. Scrapped in 1957.
- SS Sirius (Monkwearmouth, 1881) was a 1,349-ton cargo ship launched as Andalusia on 22 October 1881 by Strand Slipway Co., Monkwearmouth, England. Renamed Sirius in 1897. Wrecked in collision south of Öland in the Baltic on 7 May 1902.
- SS Sirius (1883) was an 823-ton cargo ship launched on 3 November 1883 by Flensburger Schiffbau-Gesellschaft, Flensburg, Germany. Wrecked at Thorpe Rocks in Suffolk, England, on 5 November 1888.
- SS Sirius (1884) was a 1,085-ton cargo ship launched in March 1884 by Bremer Schiffbaugesellschaft, Vegesack, Germany. Lost in explosion off Longships in Cornwall, England, on 29 June 1918.
- SS Sirius (1885) was an 877-ton cargo ship launched on 26 February 1885 by Flensburger Schiffbau-Gesellschaft, Flensburg, Germany. Sunk by aircraft on 18 May 1940, 8 nautical miles (15 km) from Harstad, Norway.
- SS Sirius (Blyth, 1889) was a 638-ton cargo ship launched on 9 November 1889 by Blyth Shipbuilding & Dry Docks Company Ltd., Blyth, Northumberland, England. Renamed four times. Scrapped in Moorburg in Hamburg, Germany, in 1936.
- SS Sirius (Southwick, 1889) was a 2,145-ton cargo ship launched on 3 April 1889 as the Deddington by Sir John Priestman & Co Ltd., Southwick, Sunderland, England. Renamed twice, the second time as Sirius in 1914. Wrecked on 16 December 1944.
- SS Sirius (1893) was a 4,659-ton cargo ship launched on 31 May 1893 as the El Cid by Newport News Shipbuilding, Newport News, Virginia, United States. Sold several times, and renamed three times, once for service with US Navy as USS Buffalo. Sailed as Sirius from 1929 until scrapped in 1933.
- SS Sirius (1894) was a 1,813-ton cargo ship launched on 4 August 1894 by Flensburger Schiffbau-Gesellschaft, Flensburg, Germany. Renamed four times during her career. Lost in collision off Wusong, China, on 27 March 1929.
- SS Sirius (1897) was a 3,351-ton cargo ship launched as Madura on 23 October 1897 by Nederlandsche in Amsterdam, Netherlands. Renamed four times during her career, the first time as Sirius in 1912. Removed from the ship registers in 1960, last traced in January 1957.
- SS Sirius (1900) was a 3,276-ton cargo ship launched on 12 February 1900 by Russell in Port Glasgow, Scotland. Renamed four times. Scrapped in Genoa, Italy, in 1932.
- SS Sirius (Irvine, 1903) was a 1,375-ton cargo ship built in 1903 by Irvine's in England. Renamed four times. Shelled and sunk as the Soviet Navy's Metallist off Hanko, Finland on 26 July 1941.
- SS Sirius (Chicago, 1903) was a 4,470-ton bulk carrier launched as R.L. Ireland on 22 August 1903 by the Chicago Shipbuilding Company in Chicago, United States. Renamed Sirius in 1913 and Ontadoc in 1926. Scrapped in 1973.
- SS Sirius (1905) was a 2,229-ton cargo ship launched as Suva on 14 December 1905 by Workman Clark & Co. Ltd. in Belfast, Northern Ireland. Renamed Sirius in 1928. Scuttled at Manila in the Philippines as the Bohol on 27 December 1941.
- SS Sirius (1909) was a 938-ton cargo ship launched as Harlingen on 12 November 1909 by Osbourne Graham & Co. Ltd. in North Hylton, England. Renamed four times, as Sirius in 1923. Lost in collision with the trawler Visenda as Feddy on 5 April 1942.
- SS Sirius (1919) was a 1,813-ton cargo ship built in 1919 by Larvik Slip, Larvik, Norway. Renamed Mariam in 1963. Still in existence in 1990.
- SS Sirius (1922) was a 998-ton cargo ship built in 1922 by Atlas Werke, Bremen, Germany. Torpedoed and sunk by the British submarine HMS Venturer on 19 March 1945.
- SS Sirius (1929) was a 2,197-ton cargo ship built in 1929 by Helsingør Værft, Helsingør, Denmark. Renamed Pechenga in 1945. Lost in 1949.
