= Albert Emptage =

English footballer

Personal information
- Full name: Albert Taylor Emptage
- Date of birth: 26 December 1917
- Place of birth: Grimsby, England
- Date of death: December 1997 (aged 79–80)
- Position: Forward

Senior career*
Years	Team	Apps	(Gls)
1938–1950	Manchester City	136	(1)
- Scunthorpe United
- Stockport County
- * Club domestic league appearances and goals

Albert Taylor Emptage (26 December 1917 – December 1997) was an English footballer who played as a wing half. Born in Grimsby in 1917, he played for Manchester City between 1938 and 1950. He made his debut in a 4–1 win against Leicester City on 15 January 1938. He appeared 136 times in the League and scored 1 goal. He also played for Scunthorpe United and Stockport County.

He later worked as a trainer at Rochdale.
