= George Emptage =

Bombay Marine officer

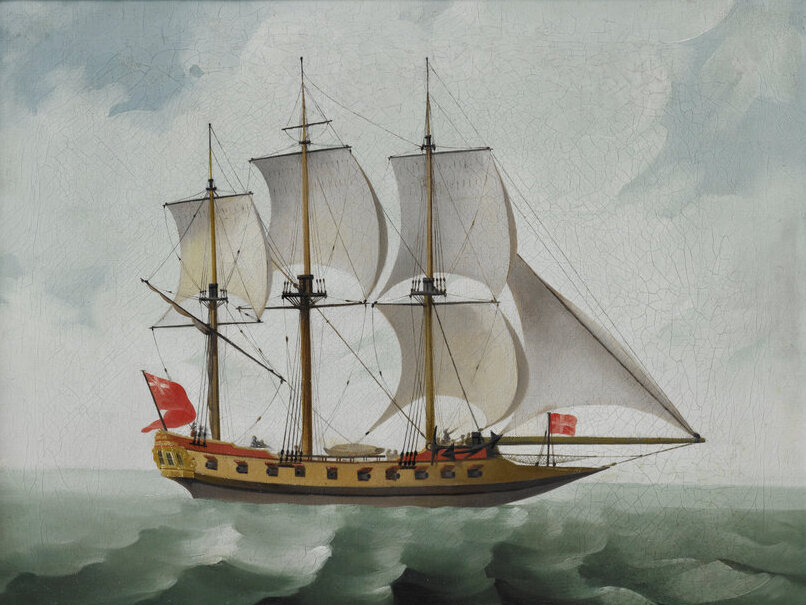
c. 1780 illustration of the Bombay Marine grab HCS Bombay

Commodore George Emptage (bapt. 27 March 1733 – 1785) was a Bombay Marine officer who served in the Second Anglo-Mysore War. Emptage was the son of Thomas Emptage, a mariner and his second wife, Elizabeth Watson, of Rotherhithe. During the late periods of the war, Tipu Sultan had been forced to retreat. Ships of the Bombay Marine under Emptage's command took Rajamundroog at the mouth of the River Merjee in conjunction with General Richard Matthews who then moved on to Onore. Emptage commanded HCS Bombay, a 28-gun grab. His daughter, Elizabeth Emptage married Richard Hall Gower. Charles Foote Gower was his grandson.
