= John Taylor (1739–1838) =

English portrait artist

John Taylor (1739–1838) was an English portrait painter.

== Life ==
Born in Bishopsgate Street, London, Taylor was the son of an officer in the customs. He studied art at the St. Martin's Lane Academy, and also under Francis Hayman. In 1766 he was one of the original members of the Incorporated Society of Artists.

Known for highly finished portraits in pencil, Taylor was from 1779 an intermittent exhibitor at the Royal Academy. Later in life he saved money by teaching in London, with the support of John Alexander Gresse and Paul Sandby. He invested in annuities to last him to the age of 100.

Taylor died in Cirencester Place, Marylebone, London, on 21 November 1838, in his ninety-ninth year. He was a friend of the sculptor Joseph Nollekens, who made a bust of him, and left him a legacy in his will.

== Notes ==
Attribution

This article incorporates text from a publication now in the public domain: Lee, Sidney, ed. (1898). "Taylor, John (1739-1838)". Dictionary of National Biography. Vol. 55. London: Smith, Elder & Co.
