= Nova Scotia House =

2025 novel by Charlie Porter

- Publisher: Nightboat Books
- Publication date: October 21, 2025
- Pages: 240
- Award: Lambda Literary Award for Gay Fiction (2026)
- ISBN: 978-1-643-62200-2

Nova Scotia House is the debut novel of Charlie Porter, published in 2025 by Nightboat Books.

The Washington Post and The Guardian named Nova Scotia House won of the best novels of 2025. The novel was shortlisted for the 2025 Goldsmiths Prize, and won the 2026 Lambda Literary Award for Gay Fiction.
