= Point of Ayr Lifeboat Station =

Former RNLI lifeboat station in Flintshire, Wales

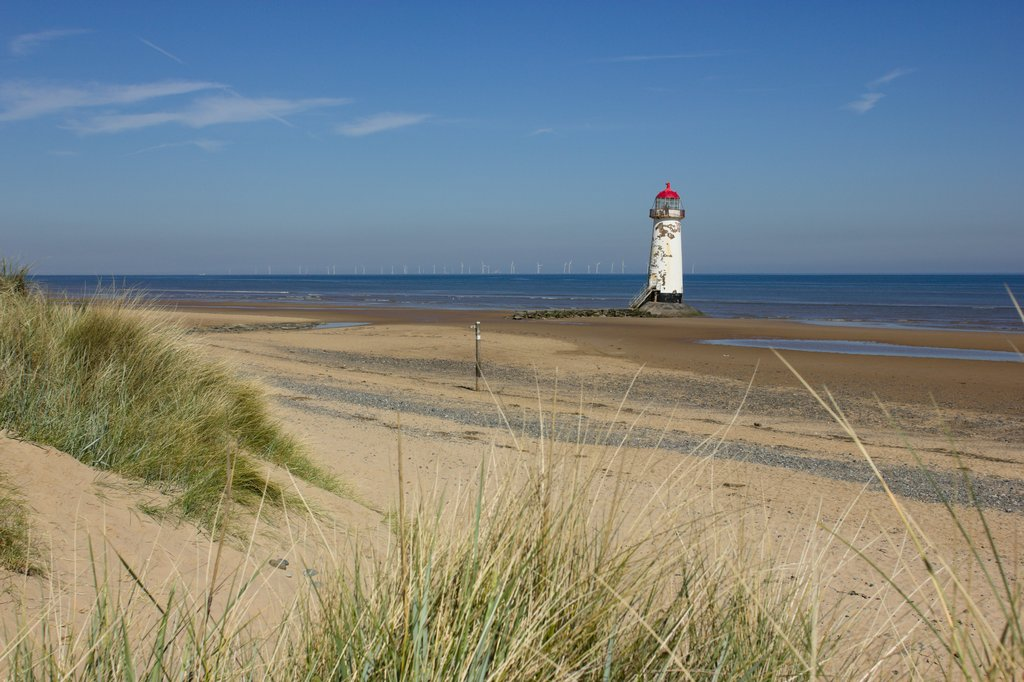
- Point of Ayr Beach and Lighthouse

- Talacre, Flintshire

General information
- Status: Closed
- Type: RNLI Lifeboat Station
- Location: Talacre Beach, Talacre, Flintshire, LL19 9TT, Wales
- Coordinates: 53°21′18″N 3°18′53″W
- Opened: 1 November 1894
- Closed: 18 October 1923

Point of Ayr Lifeboat Station (Note: Point of Ayr was used in all references to the lifeboat station operated by the RNLI following its takeover and relocation in 1894. All prior references for the station operated by the Liverpool Dock Trustees used Point of Air. Each location has its own article, see also Point of Air Lifeboat Station.) was located on the shore at Talacre beach, on the Point of Ayr (or Point of Air, varying sources), the most northerly point of Flintshire and mainland Wales.

A lifeboat was first stationed at the Point of Ayr by the Royal National Lifeboat Institution (RNLI) in 1894, after it was relocated from Gronant, 2 miles (3.2 km) to the west.

With increasing numbers of powered vessels less susceptible to wind conditions, and a resulting decline in wrecks, Point of Ayr Lifeboat Station was closed in 1923.

== History ==
By the 1890s, with an ever increasing work load due to rising levels of traffic at the Port of Liverpool, negotiations over lifeboat services took place between the Mersey Docks and Harbour Company and the RNLI. On 1 July 1894, all the lifeboat stations under the management of the Mersey Docks and Harbour Board, Formby, Hoylake, Hilbre Island and Point of Air, were handed over to the management of the RNLI.

Following the takeover, the boathouse at the old Point of Air Lifeboat Station at Gronant was found to be nearly derelict, having suffered regularly from sea ingress. It was decided to relocate the station 2 miles (3.2 km) to the east, to Talacre Beach, and the Point of Air Lifeboat Station officially closed on 30 September 1894. The No.1 lifeboat was retained, and sent to the RNLI for alterations, but the No.2 lifeboat was sold from service.

A site was provided by local landowner Sir Pyers William Mostyn, 9th Baronet, close to the existing Point of Ayr lighthouse keepers cottages, where two further cottages for the Coxswain, Second Coxswain, and their families, were constructed at a cost of £970. A 34-foot self-righting 'Pulling and Sailing' (P&S) lifeboat, one with 10 oars and sails, was temporarily placed at Talacre beach. The lifeboat, the Rochdale (ON 126), had been funded by the Rochdale Lifeboat Fund, and previously served at West Hartlepool. The boat was kept in the open, until construction of the new boathouse, which had begun the previous September, was completed in April 1895, at a final cost of £1,586-7s-2d. The new station was named Point of Ayr Lifeboat Station.

In a 14-month period, the Rochdale was launched on service five times, saving 3 lives on her first service. On 14 December 1895, a new lifeboat arrived at the Point of Ayr station. The lifeboat was a 35-foot non-self-righting Liverpool-class lifeboat, costing £459, funded by the generosity of H. G. Powell of Tettenhall, Wolverhampton.

This new boat was swiftly followed by the placement of a second lifeboat at the new station. The old 1870 No. 1 station lifeboat was returned after modifications, now being the No. 2 lifeboat, given an official RNLI number (ON 419), but remaining unnamed.

A service of dedication and naming ceremony for the No.1 lifeboat was held on 4 June 1896. After a short service by the Vicar of Llanasa, Mr Powell addressed the attendant crowd. "They who go down to the sea in ships, and do their business in great waters ought to be thought of." "If the boat ever should be the means of saving one individual from destruction, I shall feel heartily repaid for anything I have done in placing her here."

Miss Powell then broke a bottle of champagne on the bow, declaring the boat be named H. G. Powell (ON 380). The boat was then launched, and taken for a 2-mile (3.2 km) row around the River Dee Lightship, with Mr Powell taking one of the bow oars. After all the proceedings, Tea was taken at the Mostyn Arms.

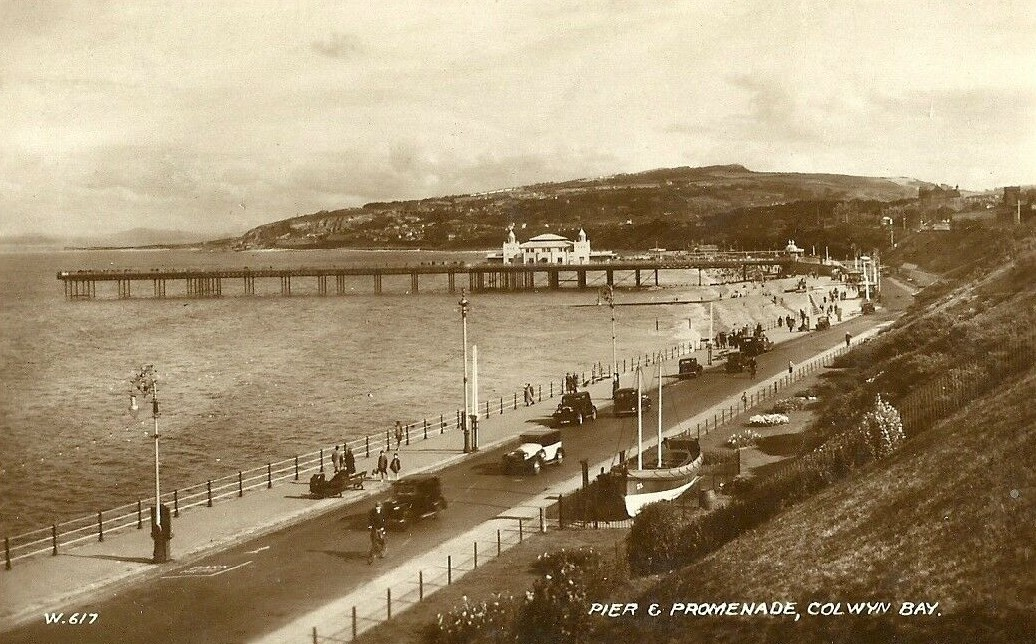
RNLB H. G. Powell (ON 380) on display at Colwyn Bay

The unnamed No. 2 station boat was called three times, saving two lives. On 11 November 1897, the lifeboat was holed whilst on exercise, when she struck the remains of a wreck in dense fog. The boat got back to shore safely, and was taken to Rutherford's boatyard in Birkenhead for repairs. The boat returned to service, but was never called again, and the station closed on 31 December 1898. The boat was sold locally.

H. G. Powell (ON 419) served Point of Ayr lifeboat station for the next 21 years, launching 23 times, and saving 22 lives. In 1916, the lifeboat was withdrawn from service, and placed on display at Colwyn Bay until 1947.

The last lifeboat placed at Point of Ayr was the John Groome (ON 460), another 35-foot non-self-righting Liverpool-class (P&S) lifeboat. The boat formerly served at Killough, the name chosen by the late Mrs Helen Groome, whose bequest funded the boat. However, the days of the Point of Ayr lifeboat were already numbered. The lifeboat was called just once in 7 years, but found no vessel in distress on that occasion. With a huge decline in shipping activity in the area following the Great War, and difficulties in retaining crew, Point of Ayr lifeboat station was closed on 18 October 1923.

The John Groome (ON 460) was later sold from service, and was reported in use as a yacht. The boat is believed to have been broken up in 2012. The lifeboat house was sold, and used as a holiday home and later as a cafe. During the Second World War, a seamine came ashore and exploded, with the damage to the boathouse resulting in its demolition.

== Point of Ayr lifeboats ==
=== No. 1 Station ===
ON (Note: ON is the RNLI's Official Number of the boat.)	Name	Built	On station	Class	Comments
126	Rochdale	1887	1894–1895	34-foot Self-righting (P&S)	(Note: 34-foot x 8-foot (10-oared) self-righting (P&S) lifeboat, funded by the Rochdale LB fund, built by Forrestt of Limehouse, London, costing £480 when new.); Previously at West Hartlepool
380	H. G. Powell	1895	1895–1916	35-foot Liverpool (P&S)	(Note: 35-foot x 9-foot (12-oared) Liverpool-class non-self-righting (P&S) lifeboat, gift of Mr H. Powell of Wolverhampton, built by Waterman of Cremyll, Cornwall, costing £459.)
460	Reserve No.9C	1901	1916–1923	35-foot Liverpool (P&S)	(Note: 35-foot x 10-foot (12-oared) Liverpool-class non-self-righting (P&S) lifeboat, legacy of Mrs H. Groome of Liverpool, built by Thames Ironworks of Blackwall, London, costing £931 when new.); Previously John Groome at Killough.

=== No. 2 Station ===
ON	Name	Built	On station	Class	Comments
419	Unnamed	1870	1896–1898	33-foot 6in Liverpool (P&S)	(Note: 33-foot 6in x 9-foot 6in (12-oared) Liverpool-class non-self-righting lifeboat, funded from Harbour Dues, built by Thomas Costain of Liverpool, costing £250 when new.); Previously at Point of Air.

== See also ==
- List of RNLI stations
- List of former RNLI stations
- Royal National Lifeboat Institution lifeboats
