= Liverpool-class P&S lifeboat =

Former RNLI lifeboat class

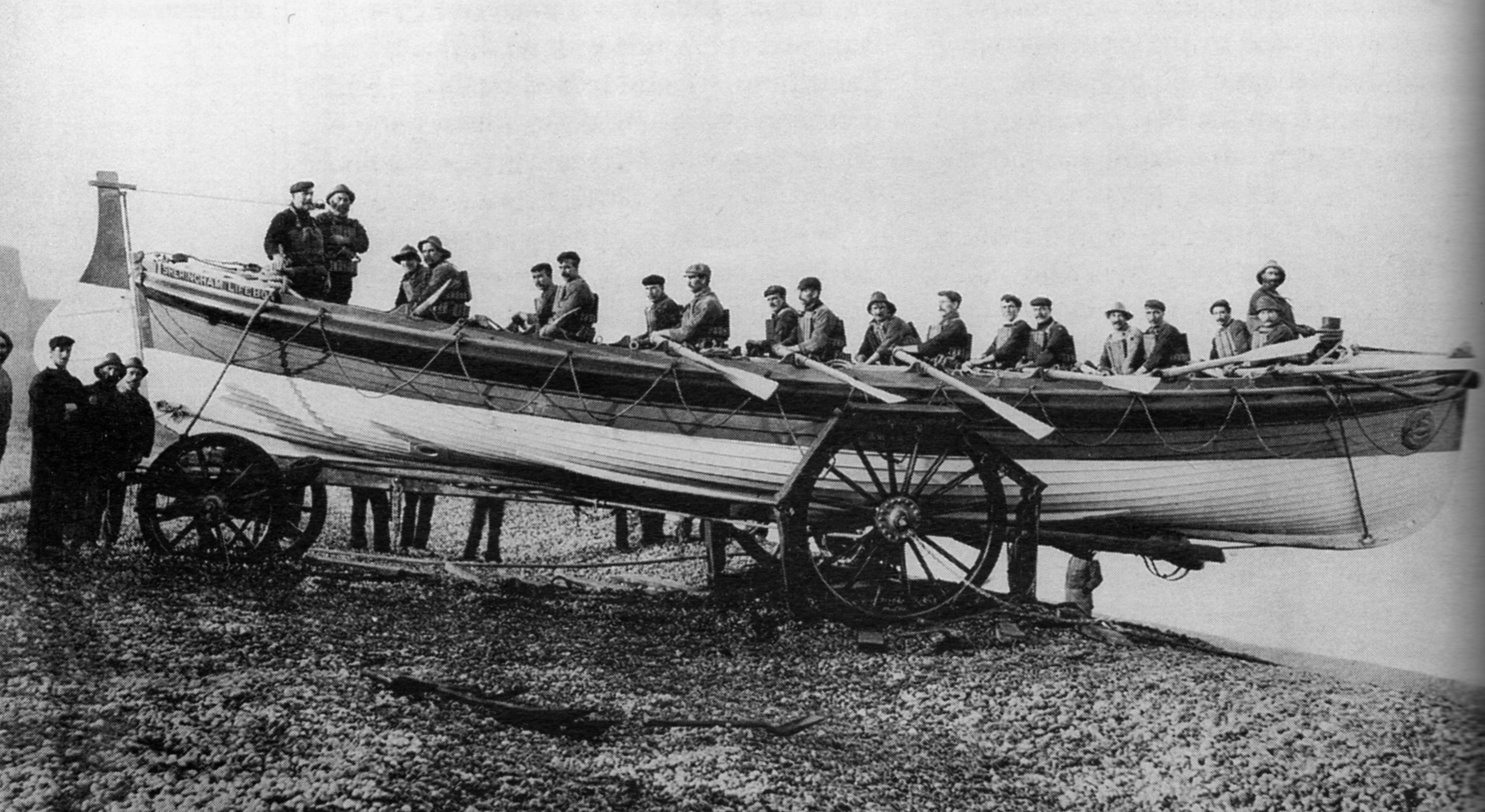
- RNLB J C Madge (ON 536) Liverpool P&S class

Class overview
- Builders: Rutherford & Co. of Birkenhead (1); Waterman of Cremyll (2); Reynolds of Lowestoft (1); James Beeching of Great Yarmouth (1); Thames Ironworks and Shipbuilding Company of Blackwall, London (31); S. E. Saunders of Cowes (2)
- Operators: Royal National Lifeboat Institution
- In service: 1895–1948
- Completed: 38
- Retired: 38

General characteristics
- Type: Pulling and sailing lifeboats
- Length: 35 ft (11 m) to 41 ft (12 m)
- Beam: 9 ft (2.7 m) to 11 ft (3.4 m)
- Propulsion: Oars and Sails

The Liverpool-class P&S lifeboats were a series of 38 non-self-righting lifeboats commissioned by the Royal National Lifeboat Institution (RNLI) between 1895 and 1916, based on the "Liverpool" lifeboats operated by the Liverpool Dock Trustees, between 1775 and 1892. They were 'Pulling and Sailing' (P&S) types (that is, powered by oars and sails), not to be confused with the later single or twin-engined Liverpool-class motor lifeboats.

== History ==
The early Liverpool-class lifeboats were funded and operated mostly by the Liverpool Dock Trustees, later to become the Mersey Docks and Harbour Company, at their stations around the River Mersey: Formby, Southport, Magazines, Hoylake, Point of Air, Hilbre Island, and Liverpool. 24 lifeboats were constructed, primarily by Thomas Costain of Liverpool, with two being adopted by the RNLI, listed below.

== Description ==
The Liverpool-class P&S lifeboats were of the non-self-righting type, primarily 35 ft 0 in (10.67 m) in length, rowing 12 oars. Typically they were launched from carriages into the sea. The first five were made by various manufacturers, but then Thames Ironworks of Blackwall, London were commissioned to produce the next 31.

The first boat was placed on service was the Admiral Briggs (ON 383) at Hilbre Island in 1895. The last boat to be withdrawn from service was the William Cantrell Ashley (ON 578), which operated at New Quay for 41 years, between 1907 and 1948.

== Fleet ==
=== Early Type ===
ON (Note: ON is the RNLI's Official Number of the boat.)	Name	Built	In service	Station	Notes
419	Unnamed	1870	1870–1894	Point of Air	(Note: 33 ft 6 in (10.21 m) x 9 ft 6 in (2.90 m) (12-oared) Liverpool-class non-self-righting (P&S) lifeboat, gift of Mersey Docks and Harbour Company, built by Thomas Costain of Liverpool, costing £250.); Modified by the RNLI in 1894, before returning to service. Sold and broken up, 1899.
419	Unnamed	1870	1896–1898	Point of Ayr (No.2)	Modified by the RNLI in 1894, before returning to service. Sold and broken up, 1899.
377	Unnamed	1892	1892–1894	Hoylake	(Note: 34 ft 3 in (10.44 m) x 9 ft 9 in (2.97 m) (12-oared) Liverpool-class non-self-righting (P&S) lifeboat, gift of Mersey Docks and Harbour Company, built by Charles Howson & Co. of Liverpool, costing £280.) Renamed Coard William Squarey in 1894.
377	Coard William Squarey	1892	1894–1906	Hoylake	Condemned and Sold, 1906.

=== RNLI Liverpool P&S lifeboats ===
Lifeboats from (ON 441) to (ON 636) built by Thames Ironworks of Blackwall, London, with (ON 636) completed by the RNLI following the bankruptcy of Thames Ironworks.

ON	Name	Built	In service	Station	Notes
383	Admiral Briggs	1895	1895–1914	Hilbre Island	(Note: 35 ft 0 in (10.67 m) x 9 ft 0 in (2.74 m) (12-oared) lifeboat, gift of Maj.-Gen. W. L. Briggs, CB, built by Rutherford & Co. of Birkenhead, costing £453.) Condemned and sold, 1914
380	H. G. Powell	1895	1895–1915	Point of Ayr	(Note: 35 ft 0 in (10.67 m) x 9 ft 0 in (2.74 m) (12-oared) lifeboat, gift of Mr H. G. Powell of Wolverhampton, built by Waterman of Cremyll, costing £459.) Condemned 1916, placed on display at Colwyn Bay until 1947.
381	John and Henrietta	1895	1896–1919	Formby	(Note: 35 ft 0 in (10.67 m) x 9 ft 0 in (2.74 m) (12-oared) lifeboat, gift of Mrs H. Bell of London, built by Waterman of Cremyll, costing £459.) Condemned and sold, 1919.
413	James Stevens No.2	1898	1898–1912	Campbeltown	(Note: 35 ft 0 in (10.67 m) x 10 ft 0 in (3.05 m) (12-oared) lifeboat, gift of Mr J. Stevens of Birmingham, built by Reynolds of Lowestoft, costing £538.) Sold 1924.
413	Reserve No.9A	1898	1912–1914	Relief fleet	Sold 1924.
413	Reserve No.9A	1898	1914–1924	Hilbre Island	Sold 1924.
425	James Stevens No. 8	1899	1899–1913	Ardrossan	(Note: 35 ft 0 in (10.67 m) x 10 ft 0 in (3.05 m) (10/12-oared) lifeboat, gift of Mr J. Stevens of Birmingham, built by James Beeching of Great Yarmouth, costing £544.) Sold 1920.
425	Reserve No.9B	1899	1913–1916	Wells-next-the-Sea	Sold 1920.
425	Reserve No.9B	1899	1916–1920	Relief fleet	Sold 1920.
441	Isabella	1900	1900–1932	Buckhaven	(Note: 35 ft 0 in (10.67 m) x 10 ft 0 in (3.05 m) (12-oared) lifeboat, legacy of Mrs I. Haxton of Kirkcaldy, costing £885.) Sold 1932.
443	William Arthur Millward	1900	1901–1931	Dunbar	(Note: 35 ft 0 in (10.67 m) x 10 ft 0 in (3.05 m) (12-oared) lifeboat, legacy of Mr W. A Millward of Chapel-en-le-Frith, costing £879.) Sold 1931.
451	James Stevens No. 17	1900	1900–1922	Porthoustock	(Note: 36 ft 0 in (10.97 m) x 9 ft 0 in (2.74 m) (12-oared) lifeboat, legacy of Mr J. Stephens of Birmingham, costing £773.) Sold 1922. Renamed Salvor II. Last reported at Falmouth, 1922.
452	James Stevens No. 18	1901	1901–1931	Girvan	(Note: 35 ft 0 in (10.67 m) x 10 ft 0 in (3.05 m) (12-oared) lifeboat, legacy of Mr J. Stephens of Birmingham, costing £938.) Sold 1931.
458	Constance Melanie	1901	1901–1934	Coverack	(Note: 35 ft 0 in (10.67 m) x 10 ft 0 in (3.05 m) (12-oared) lifeboat, legacy of Mr F. E. Hills of Penshurst, costing £906.) Sold 1934. Renamed Grace Darling II. Lost at Brancaster in 1966.
460	John Groome	1901	1901–1914	Killough (Rossglass)	(Note: 35 ft 0 in (10.67 m) x 10 ft 0 in (3.05 m) (12-oared) lifeboat, legacy of Mrs H. Groome of Liverpool, costing £931.) Sold 1934. Renamed Cloud, later Flying Cloud. Reported as a yacht at Portree in the 1930s. Believed broken up at Mochdre, August 2012.
460	Reserve No.9C	1901	1915–1916	Relief fleet	Sold 1934. Renamed Cloud, later Flying Cloud. Reported as a yacht at Portree in the 1930s. Believed broken up at Mochdre, August 2012.
460	Reserve No.9C	1901	1916–1923	Point of Ayr	Sold 1934. Renamed Cloud, later Flying Cloud. Reported as a yacht at Portree in the 1930s. Believed broken up at Mochdre, August 2012.
460	Reserve No.9C	1901	1923–1925	Storage	Sold 1934. Renamed Cloud, later Flying Cloud. Reported as a yacht at Portree in the 1930s. Believed broken up at Mochdre, August 2012.
461	Chapman	1901	1901–1920	Groomsport	(Note: 35 ft 0 in (10.67 m) x 10 ft 0 in (3.05 m) (12-oared) lifeboat, legacy of Mrs M. A. Chapman of West Brompton, costing £922.) Sold 1939. Renamed Harbinger, later Peggy (LR 41). Restored and displayed as Chapman at Hoylake Lifeboat Museum until 2015. On display at the Old Lifeboat House, Lytham, December 2025.
461	Reserve No.9B	1901	1920–1924	Relief fleet	Sold 1939. Renamed Harbinger, later Peggy (LR 41). Restored and displayed as Chapman at Hoylake Lifeboat Museum until 2015. On display at the Old Lifeboat House, Lytham, December 2025.
461	Chapman	1901	1924–1938	Hilbre Island	Sold 1939. Renamed Harbinger, later Peggy (LR 41). Restored and displayed as Chapman at Hoylake Lifeboat Museum until 2015. On display at the Old Lifeboat House, Lytham, December 2025.
477	George Leicester	1901	1901–1927	Minehead	(Note: 35 ft 0 in (10.67 m) x 10 ft 0 in (3.05 m) (12-oared) lifeboat, legacy of Miss Leicester of Bayswater, costing £967.) Sold 1927.
493	William Maynard	1902	1903–1930	Skerries	(Note: 35 ft 0 in (10.67 m) x 10 ft 0 in (3.05 m) (12-oared) lifeboat, legacy of Mr W. S. F. Maynard of Cressingham, costing £921.) Sold 1931.
494	Hopwood	1902	1902–1924	Portrush	(Note: 35 ft 0 in (10.67 m) x 10 ft 0 in (3.05 m) (12-oared) lifeboat, legacy of Mr S. W. Hopwood of Westminster, costing £817.) Sold 1930. Renamed Aurora, later Gladrian, last report as a Yacht on the River Thames at Chelsea, 1977
494	Reserve No.9F	1902	1924–1927	Relief fleet	Sold 1930. Renamed Aurora, later Gladrian, last report as a Yacht on the River Thames at Chelsea, 1977
494	Reserve No.9F	1902	1927–1930	Minehead	Sold 1930. Renamed Aurora, later Gladrian, last report as a Yacht on the River Thames at Chelsea, 1977
495	Louisa Heartwell	1902	1902–1923	Cromer	(Note: 38 ft 0 in (11.58 m) x 10 ft 9 in (3.28 m) (14-oared) lifeboat, legacy of Miss E. Heartwell of London, fitted with two water ballast tanks and two sliding or drop-keels, costing £982.) Sold 1931. Renamed Waiora. Under restoration as Louisa Heartwell at Chatham Historic Dockyard, December 2025.
495	Louisa Heartwell	1902	1923–1931	Cromer No.2	Sold 1931. Renamed Waiora. Under restoration as Louisa Heartwell at Chatham Historic Dockyard, December 2025.
498	Philip Beach	1902	1902–1930	Burnham-on-Sea	(Note: 35 ft 0 in (10.67 m) x 10 ft 0 in (3.05 m) (10/12-oared) lifeboat, legacy of Mrs S. Beach of London, costing £837.) Sold 1930. Renamed Burnlibo. Last seen at Liverpool, 1957.
511	Olive	1903	1903–1921	Eastbourne	(Note: 36 ft 0 in (10.97 m) x 9 ft 0 in (2.74 m) (12-oared) lifeboat, legacies of the Misses Wingate of Edinburgh, costing £839.) Sold 1922. Renamed Ocean King. Believed broken up in 1950.
514	Alexandra	1903	1903–1930	Hope Cove	(Note: 35 ft 0 in (10.67 m) x 10 ft 0 in (3.05 m) (12/14-oared) lifeboat, gift of the Freemasons of England, costing £945.) Sold 1934. Converted to be a holiday home, Isle of Seil, December 2025.
514	Alexandra	1903	1931–1934	Cromer No.2	Sold 1934. Converted to be a holiday home, Isle of Seil, December 2025.
516	Charles Deere James	1903	1904–1909	St Agnes	(Note: 38 ft 0 in (11.58 m) x 10 ft 0 in (3.05 m) (10-oared) lifeboat, gift of Mrs S. C. Guthrie of Tunbridge Wells, costing £1,054.) Sold 1927. Renamed Silver Cloud. Destroyed in Cherbourg Harbour, 1950.
516	Reserve No.9	1903	1909–1913	Relief fleet	Sold 1927. Renamed Silver Cloud. Destroyed in Cherbourg Harbour, 1950.
516	Reserve No.9	1903	1913–1919	Humber	Sold 1927. Renamed Silver Cloud. Destroyed in Cherbourg Harbour, 1950.
516	Reserve No.9	1903	1919–1924	Relief fleet	Sold 1927. Renamed Silver Cloud. Destroyed in Cherbourg Harbour, 1950.
516	Reserve No.9	1903	1924–1925	Winterton No.2	Sold 1927. Renamed Silver Cloud. Destroyed in Cherbourg Harbour, 1950.
516	Reserve No.9	1903	1925–1927	Relief fleet	Sold 1927. Renamed Silver Cloud. Destroyed in Cherbourg Harbour, 1950.
524	William and Emma	1904	1904–1916	Salcombe	(Note: 35 ft 0 in (10.67 m) x 10 ft 0 in (3.05 m) (12-oared) lifeboat, legacy of Mrs E. E. Cox of Weston-super-Mare, fitted with two water ballast tanks and two sliding or drop-keels, costing £924.); Capsized and wrecked on service with the loss of 13 crew, 27 October 1916.
526	Charles Burton	1904	1904–1927	Grimsby	(Note: 38 ft 0 in (11.58 m) x 10 ft 9 in (3.28 m) (14-oared) lifeboat, legacy of Mr C. T. H. Burton, costing £1,044.) Sold 1942. Renamed Silver Queen, later Freelance. Broken up at Peel, Isle of Man, February 2018.
526	Reserve No. 9C	1904	1927–1929	Relief fleet	Sold 1942. Renamed Silver Queen, later Freelance. Broken up at Peel, Isle of Man, February 2018.
526	Charles Burton	1904	1929–1941	Caister	Sold 1942. Renamed Silver Queen, later Freelance. Broken up at Peel, Isle of Man, February 2018.
536	J C Madge	1904	1904–1936	Sheringham	(Note: 41 ft 0 in (12.50 m) x 11 ft 0 in (3.35 m) (16-oared) lifeboat, legacy of Mr J. C. Madge of Southampton, fitted with two sliding or drop-keels and two water-ballast tanks, costing £1,436.) Sold 1936. On display at The Mo Sheringham Museum, December 2025.
542	John Rowson Lingard	1905	1905–1920	Mablethorpe	(Note: 36 ft 0 in (10.97 m) x 9 ft 0 in (2.74 m) (12-oared) lifeboat, legacy of Mrs M. C. Lingard of St Leonards-on-Sea, costing £988.) Sold 1937. Renamed Orion. Stored for restoration since 2012 at Yonne (river), Migennes, France, December 2024.
542	Reserve No. 9D	1905	1921–1930	Relief fleet	Sold 1937. Renamed Orion. Stored for restoration since 2012 at Yonne (river), Migennes, France, December 2024.
542	John Rowson Lingard	1905	1930–1937	Blackpool	Sold 1937. Renamed Orion. Stored for restoration since 2012 at Yonne (river), Migennes, France, December 2024.
545	Edward Z. Dresden	1905	1905–1929	Aldeburgh No.2	(Note: 38 ft 0 in (11.58 m) x 10 ft 9 in (3.28 m) (14-oared) lifeboat, legacy of Mr E. Dresden of Curzon Street, fitted with two drop-keels, costing £1,445.) Sold 1929. Renamed Cormorant, Aldeburgh, later Ceol Mara. Last reported at Ardrishaig, Argyll & Bute, 1974.
553	John	1906	1906–1931	Cloughey	(Note: 35 ft 0 in (10.67 m) x 10 ft 0 in (3.05 m) (12-oared) lifeboat, legacy of Mr J. A. Hay of Cheltenham, costing £973.) Sold 1929.
553	John	1906	1932–1937	Newcastle	Sold 1929.
554	Samuel Lewis	1906	1906–1932	Skegness	(Note: 35 ft 0 in (10.67 m) x 10 ft 0 in (3.05 m) (12-oared) lifeboat, gift of Mrs A. Lewis-Hill of London, costing £956.) Sold 1932. Renamed Grace Darling I, last reported at Arbroath, 1970s.
555	Hannah Fawsett Bennett	1906	1906–1931	Hoylake	(Note: 38 ft 0 in (11.58 m) x 10 ft 0 in (3.05 m) (12-oared) lifeboat, legacy of Mrs L. H. F. Bennett and Mr C. H. Lear of West Kirby, costing £1,160.) Sold 1936. Last reported at South Benfleet, 1937.
555	Hannah Fawsett Bennett	1906	1931–1936	Relief fleet	Sold 1936. Last reported at South Benfleet, 1937.
569	Sarah Kay	1906	1907–1943	Skateraw	(Note: 35 ft 0 in (10.67 m) x 10 ft 0 in (3.05 m) (12-oared) lifeboat, legacy of Mr E. Kay of Southsea, costing £938.) Sold 1943. Renamed Grace Darling III. Lost at Skegness, 1966
578	William Cantrell Ashley	1907	1907–1948	New Quay	(Note: 35 ft 0 in (10.67 m) x 10 ft 0 in (3.05 m) (12-oared) lifeboat, legacy of Mr C. C. Ashley of Menton, France, costing £961.); Given to Outward Bound School, Aberdyfi in 1949, Renamed T.R.G.S.. Currently in storage as William Cantrell Ashley at the National Collections Centre, Nantgarw awaiting restoration / display, December 2025.
586	Caroline	1908	1908–1935	Blakeney	(Note: 38 ft 0 in (11.58 m) x 10 ft 9 in (3.28 m) (14-oared) lifeboat, legacy of Mr C. Everard of Salisbury, costing £1,202.) Sold 1935. Renamed Blakeney Dawn. Last reported at Barrow upon Soar, 1960, now believed broken up.
587	James Scarlett	1908	1908–1925	St Annes	(Note: 36 ft 0 in (10.97 m) x 9 ft 0 in (2.74 m) (12-oared) lifeboat, legacy of Mr J. Scarlett of Bowden, costing £1,026.); Display / Demonstration boat at St Annes (1925–1928). Sold 1928. Renamed Katherine, later Nymphea. Last reported at Kings Lynn, 1969.
598	Brother and Sister	1909	1909–1932	Llanddulas	(Note: 36 ft 0 in (10.97 m) x 9 ft 0 in (2.74 m) (12-oared) lifeboat, legacy of Miss L. B. Courtney of Brompton Square, costing £939.) Sold 1932.
604	Janet Hoyle	1909	1910–1932	Ayr	(Note: 35 ft 0 in (10.67 m) x 10 ft 0 in (3.05 m) (12-oared) lifeboat, gift of Mr T. K. Hardie of Bayswater, costing £1,007.) Sold 1935. Broken up at Hickmans boatyard, Brightlingsea, December 2016.
626	Arthur Lionel	1912	1912–1929	St Peter Port	(Note: 35 ft 0 in (10.67 m) x 10 ft 0 in (3.05 m) (12-oared) lifeboat, legacy of Sir Thomas Tobin of Ballincollig, costing £1,170.) Sold 1939. Renamed Dorian Rose, later John Briscoe. Last reported at Fishguard, August 1973
626	Arthur Lionel	1912	1930–1939	Minehead	Sold 1939. Renamed Dorian Rose, later John Briscoe. Last reported at Fishguard, August 1973
636	James and John Young	1913	1913–1930	Ardrossan	(Note: 35 ft 0 in (10.67 m) x 10 ft 0 in (3.05 m) (12-oared) lifeboat, legacy of Mr J. Young of Pollockshields, built partially by Thames Ironworks of Blackwall, London, completed by the RNLI (following the bankruptcy of Thames Ironworks).) Sold 1939. Renamed Alma of Southampton. Displayed as James and John Young at the EISCA collection, Eyemouth. Sold 2017, on display since 2018 as an upturned hull, outside the People's Palace, Glasgow, December 2025.
636	James and John Young	1913	1930–1939	Relief fleet	Sold 1939. Renamed Alma of Southampton. Displayed as James and John Young at the EISCA collection, Eyemouth. Sold 2017, on display since 2018 as an upturned hull, outside the People's Palace, Glasgow, December 2025.
661	Mary Stanford	1916	1916–1928	Rye Harbour (Winchelsea)	(Note: 38 ft 0 in (11.58 m) x 10 ft 4 in (3.15 m) (14-oared) lifeboat, legacy of Mr J. F. Stanford of Regent's Park, built by S. E. Saunders of Cowes, fitted with two water ballast tanks and two drop-keel costing £2,173.); Capsized on service, with the loss of all 17 crew. 15 November 1928. Broken up, 1929.
665	Baltic	1916	1916–1936	Wells-next-the-Sea	(Note: 38 ft 0 in (11.58 m) x 10 ft 9 in (3.28 m) (14-oared) lifeboat, gift of the Baltic Exchange LB fund, built by S. E. Saunders of Cowes, weighing 4 tons 11cwt, fitted with 12 relieving tubes, ordinary keel, 2 drop keels, and 2 water ballast tanks<, costing £2,233.) Sold 1943. Renamed Fidelis, Cormorant and Marvin. Broken up as Baltic, at Smiths Quay, River Itchen, Southampton, September 2006.
665	Baltic	1916	1936–1940	Aldeburgh No.2	Sold 1943. Renamed Fidelis, Cormorant and Marvin. Broken up as Baltic, at Smiths Quay, River Itchen, Southampton, September 2006.
665	Baltic	1916	1940–1943	Relief fleet	Sold 1943. Renamed Fidelis, Cormorant and Marvin. Broken up as Baltic, at Smiths Quay, River Itchen, Southampton, September 2006.

== See also ==
- Liverpool-class lifeboat
- Royal National Lifeboat Institution lifeboats
