= Minehead Lifeboat Station =

Lifeboat station in Somerset, England

- Flag of the RNLI

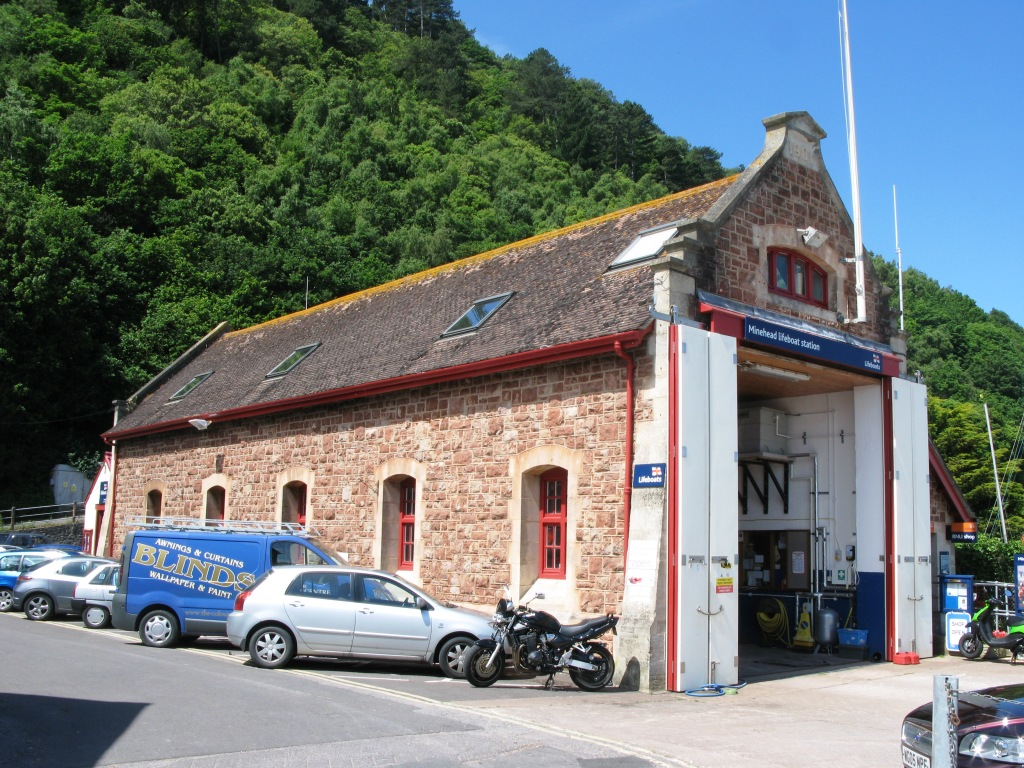
- Minehead Lifeboat Station in 2009

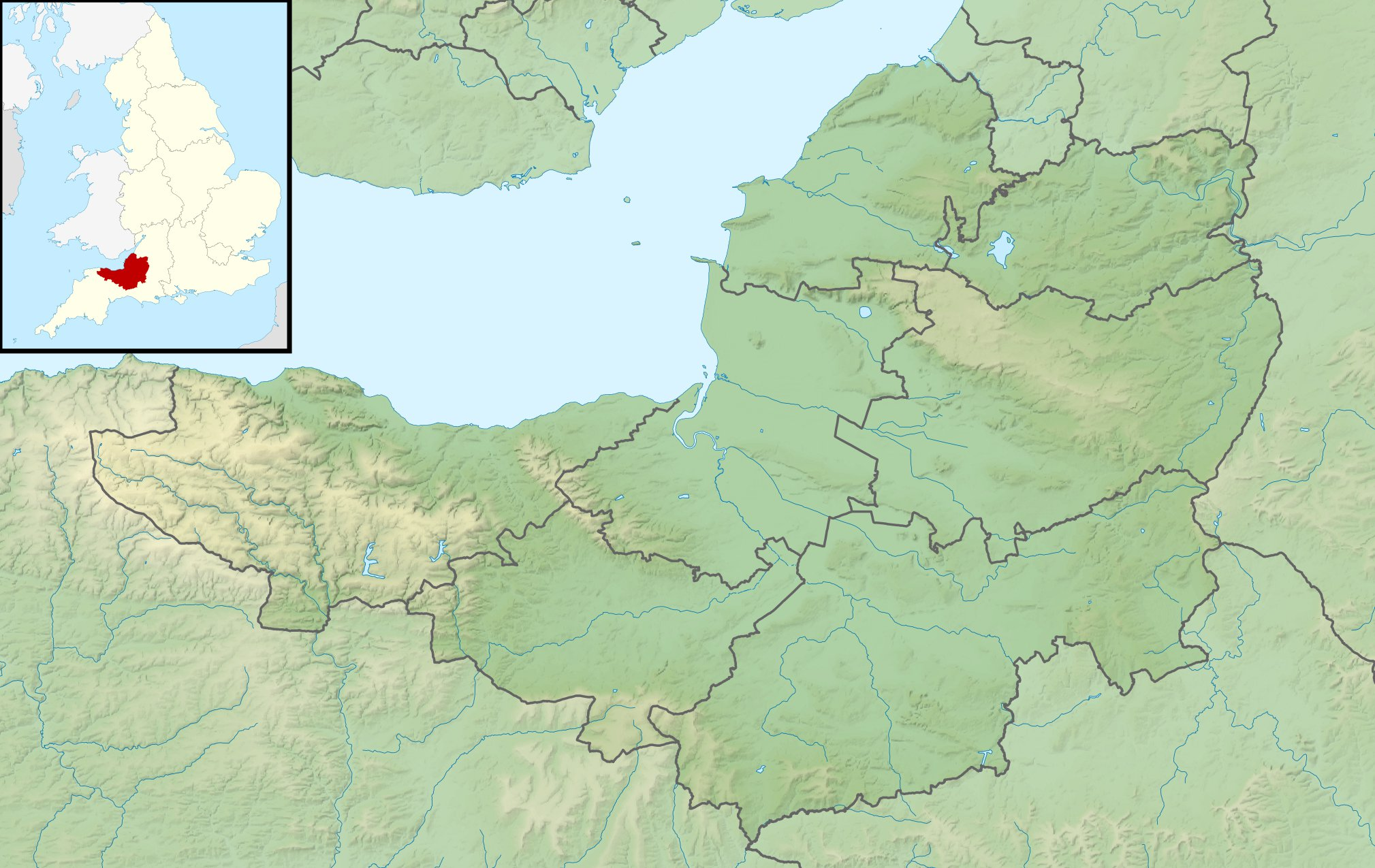
- Location within Somerset

General information
- Type: Lifeboat station
- Location: Quay West, Minehead, Somerset, United Kingdom
- Coordinates: 51.2140°N 3.4753°W
- Opened: 1901
- Owner: Royal National Lifeboat Institution

Website
- RNLI: Minehead Lifeboat Station

Minehead Lifeboat Station is located on Quay West in Minehead, a seaside resort approximately 23 mi (37 km) north-west of Taunton, sitting at the foot of the Exmoor National Park, overlooking the Bristol Channel, in the county of Somerset, England.

A lifeboat was first stationed in the town in 1901, by the Royal National Lifeboat Institution (RNLI).

The station currently operates a B-class (Atlantic 85) Inshore lifeboat, Penny J II (B-939), on station since 2023, and the smaller D-class (IB1) Inshore lifeboat, Exmoor Belle (D847), on station since 2020.

== History ==
On the evening of 12 January 1899, the Lynmouth lifeboat was involved in an epic service, with a team of over 20 horses dragging the 10-ton lifeboat and carriage over Exmoor, a distance of 15 miles (24 km), climbing and descending over 1,423 feet (434 m), before launching at Porlock Weir on 13 December, to the aid of the three-masted-ship Forest Hall.

In the months following this service, questions were inevitably raised regarding the lack of lifeboat cover for the area. The towns of Watchet and Minehead were visited by the Chief Inspector of Lifeboats, and following his report to the meeting of the RNLI committee of management on Thursday 11 October 1900, it was decided to establish a lifeboat station at Minehead, "there being sufficient men available for manning and launching the boat, in order to strengthen the Life-boat Service on the coast of Somerset."

A new boathouse was constructed, on a suitable site granted by Mr Geoffrey F. Luttrell, Lord of the manor, at a cost of £803-11s. A new 35 ft (11 m) non-self-righting Liverpool-class 'Pulling and Sailing' (P&S) lifeboat, one with sails and (12) oars, arrived on station in 1901. The cost of the lifeboat and its equipment was provided by the legacy of Miss Leicester of Bayswater, and in accordance with her wishes, was named George Leicester (ON 477).

For two years the boat was launched across the beach using skids, but from 1903 a carriage was provided.

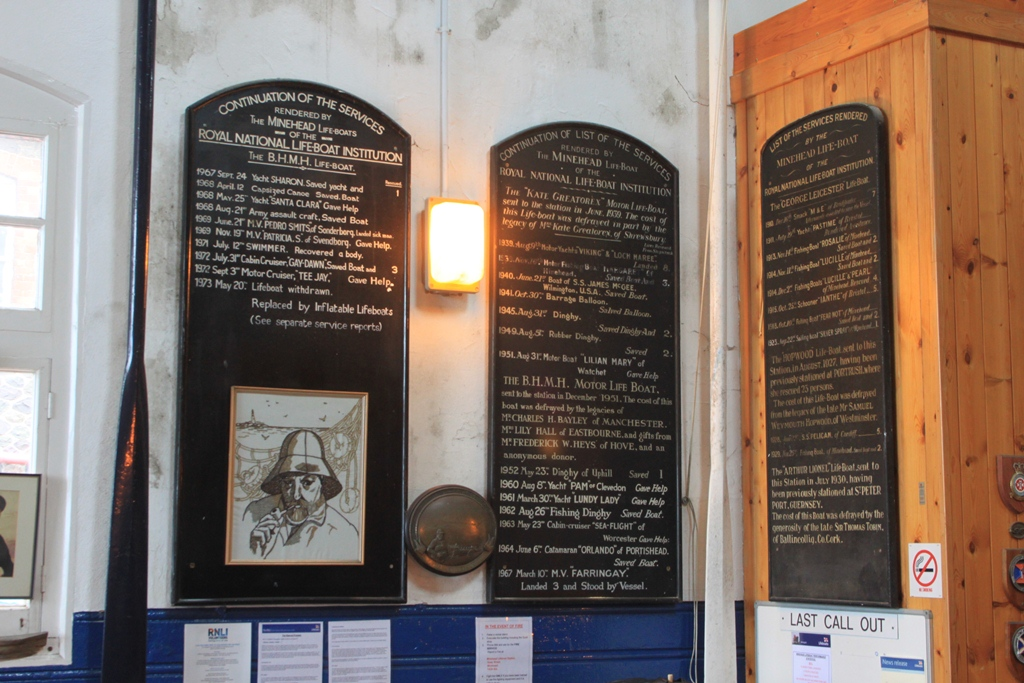
Minehead Lifeboat Service Boards

In 1939, the station's pulling and sailing boat was withdrawn and replaced by a motor lifeboat. The boat was a lightweight 32 ft (9.8 m) Surf-class lifeboat, one of nine constructed for stations where launching heavier boats was more difficult. Instead of relying on horses or manpower to launch the boat, a Clayton launch tractor was also sent to the station.

The Surf-class lifeboat was also unusual, as instead of standard propellers, the twin Weyburn 'F2' 12-hp engines provided drive to two Gill water jet propulsion units, delivering 6.5 knots (12.0 km/h; 7.5 mph), and a range of 88 mi (142 km) at full speed. Costing £3,478, and funded by the legacy of Miss Kate Greatorex of Mytton Hall, Shrewsbury, at a ceremony on 26 July 1939, with over 3000 people in attendance, Mrs G. F. Luttrell named the new lifeboat Kate Greatorex (ON 816).

On 18 December 1941, the local naval officer reported wreckage in the mud at Blue Anchor Bay, to be investigated. Lifeboat coxswain John Slade set out in his own boat The Mouette, accompanied by fireman, and lifeboat shore signalman, Thomas Escott. What was thought to be part of an aircraft, turned out to be a parachute mine, which exploded as the men went closer to inspect, killing them both. Slade and Escott were Minehead's only direct fatalities of enemy action.

In 1964, in response to an increasing amount of water-based leisure activity, the RNLI placed 25 small fast Inshore lifeboats around the country. These were easily launched with just a few people, ideal to respond quickly to local emergencies. Gradually more Inshore lifeboats were deployed, with a D-class (RFD PB16) (D-177) being placed at Minehead in April 1970, and housed in the tractor garage.

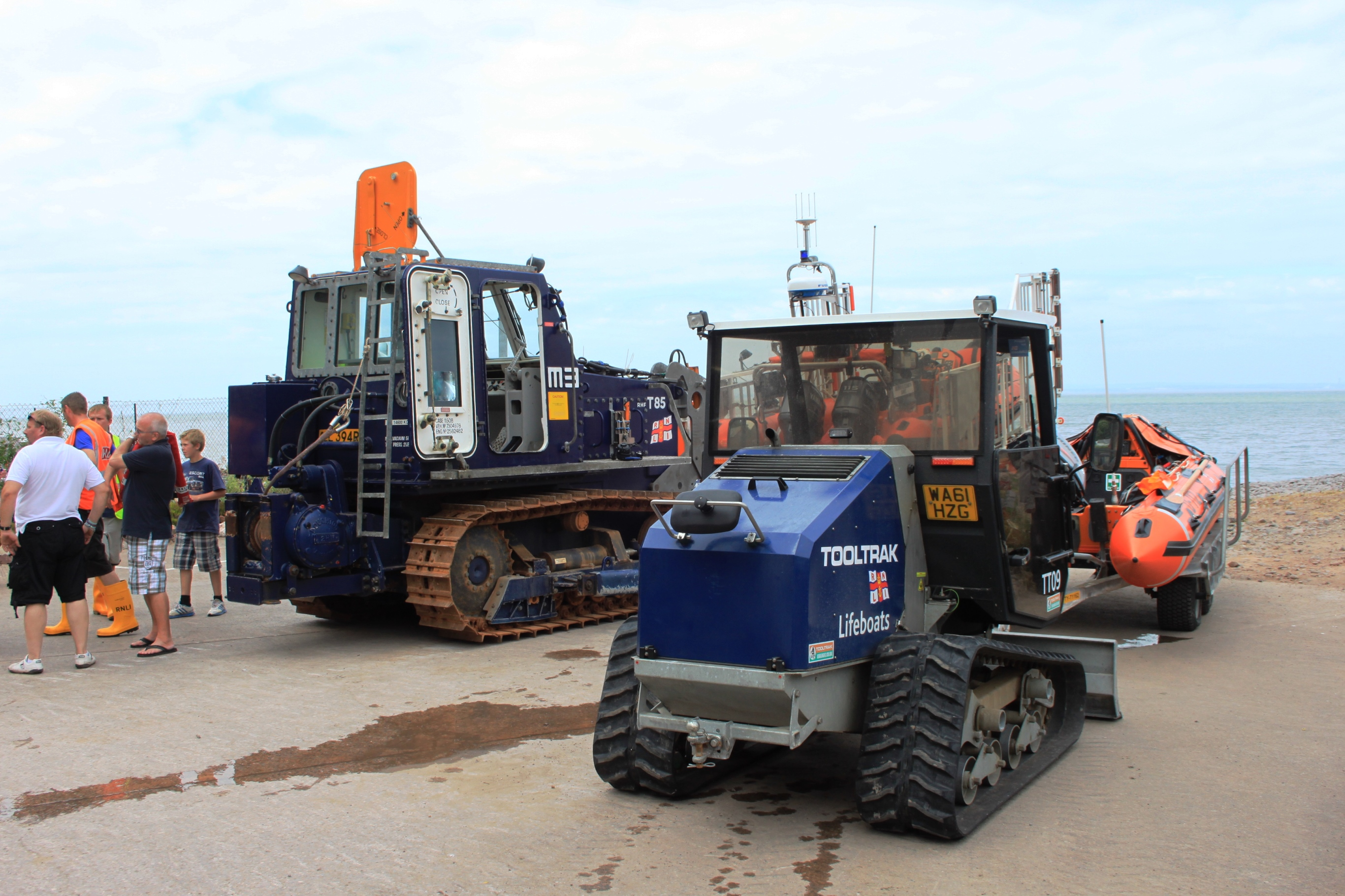
Talus MBC Case 1150B and Tooltrak launch tractors at Minehead in 2013

Following a coastal review, the All-weather lifeboat B. H. M. H. (ON 882) was withdrawn on 20 May 1973. The following year, a second Inshore lifeboat arrived. The C-class Inshore lifeboat (C-500) was a twin-engined development of the D-class lifeboat. After five years service, the C-class was replaced by the much larger twin-engined B-class (Atlantic 21) RIB, Catherine Plumbley (B-544), which would serve at Minehead for the following 15 years.

The building was modified again in 1993, to accommodate a new B-class (Atlantic 75) lifeboat, Bessie (B-708), and the opportunity was taken to modernise the crew facilities and add a gift shop alongside.

Minehead was the first RNLI station to use a Tooltrak tractor to launch its D-class lifeboat. This replaced an older Argocat tractor in 2011.

== Notable rescues ==
On 2 July 1972, Helm David James scaled Culver cliff to rescue a man stuck 50 ft (15 m) above sea-level. The D-class anchor rope was used to help lower the man. James received a "Framed Letter of Thanks signed by Chairman of the Institution".

In 1973, four children were cut-off by the tide at Dunster Beach. PC Timothy Marsh swam 0.5 mi (0.80 km) to assist two other holiday makers, who had waded out, and were holding the children above the water, and managed to rope them all together. The lifeboat launched in under two minutes, and all seven, along with another child, who had set out in a dingy to assist, but had himself been capsized, were rescued. The three men ware each awarded the Royal Humane Society Testimonial on Vellum.

On 13 September 1975, the three crew of the C-class lifeboat launched at 23:35 into gale-force conditions, and saved the lives of three people from the yacht Svea. Helm Christopher Rundle was accorded "The Thanks of the Institution inscribed on Vellum", with Vellum Service Certificates presented to crew members Peter McGregor and Albert Hartgen.

== Station extension ==
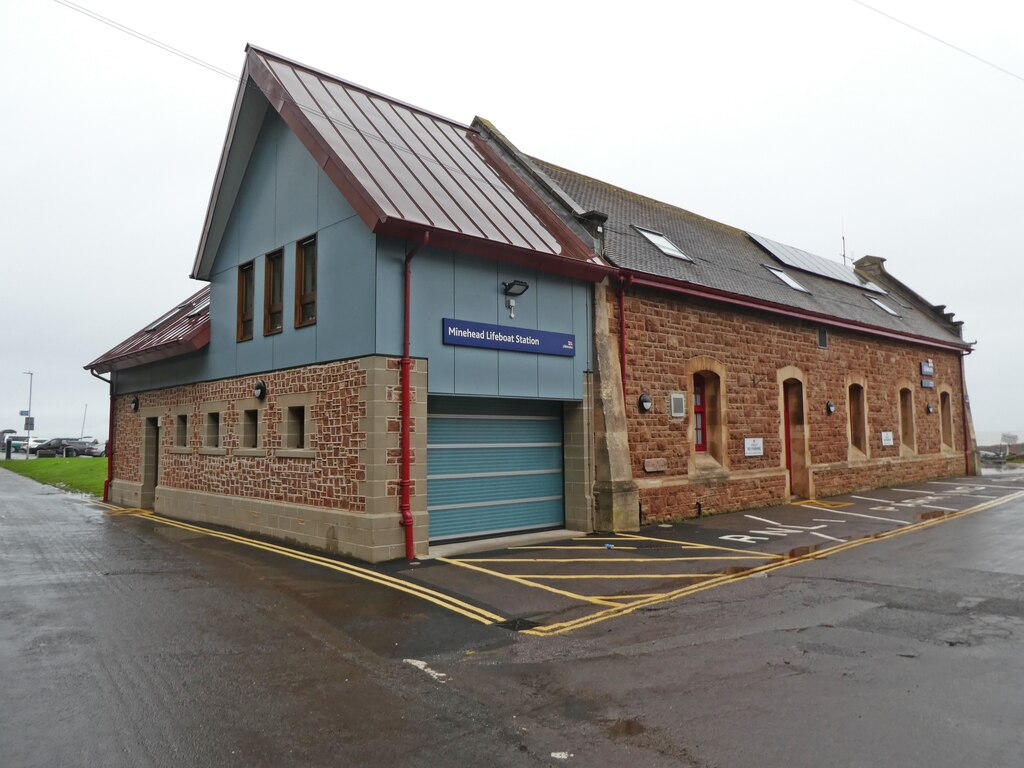
New extension at Minehead Lifeboat Station

Fundraising started in 2021, to modernise the facilities and to enlarge the boat house, so that both lifeboats could be launched more quickly.

The stone-built boat house is situated at the western end of the town beyond the harbour, where there is access to water at all states of the tide.

There is a hard standing in front of the boat house but boats are taken down the pebble beach when launched. Due to the nature of the beach, both launch vehicles are track laying vehicles.

A small detached garage behind the main boathouse was demolished, and the original boat house has been sympathetically extended, with an attached garage at the back, and a gift shop for fund-raising on the west side.

== Area of operation ==
The Atlantic 85 can be launched in Force 7 winds (Force 6 at night) and can operate at up to 35 knots (65 km/h) for 2½ hours. Adjacent lifeboats are at Ilfracombe Lifeboat Station to the west, and Burnham-on-Sea Lifeboat Station to the east. If a larger all-weather boat is needed in the area, it may come from Ilfracombe or across the Bristol Channel from Barry Dock.

== Station honours ==
The following are awards made at Minehead:

- A Framed Letter of Thanks signed by Chairman of the Institution
  David James, Helm – 1972
- Testimonial on Vellum, awarded by the Royal Humane Society
  PC Timothy Marsh – 1974
  A. G. Wakeford – 1974
  Unknown member of public – 1974
- The Thanks of the Institution inscribed on Vellum
  Christopher Rundle, Helm – 1975
- Vellum Service Certificate
  Peter S. McGregor, crew member – 1975
  Albert J. Hartgen, crew member – 1975

== Roll of honour ==
In memory of those lost whilst serving Minehead lifeboat:

- Suffered from exposure whilst on service in 1910, and died the following year
  William Porter Slade, crew member (34)
- Killed by a parachute mine whilst investigating wreckage, 18 December 1941
  John Slade, Coxswain (56)
  Thomas Escott, shore signalman (46)

== Minehead lifeboats ==
=== Pulling and Sailing (P&S) lifeboats ===
On station	ON (Note: ON is the RNLI's Official Number of the boat.)	Name	Built	Class	Comments
1901–1927	477	George Leicester	1901	35-foot Liverpool (P&S)	(Note: 35 ft 0 in (10.67 m) x 10 ft 0 in (3.05 m) (12-oared) Liverpool-class non-self-righting (P&S) lifeboat, legacy of Miss Leicester of Bayswater, built by Thames Ironworks of Blackwall, London, costing £967.); Sold 1927.
1927–1930	494	Reserve No. 9F	1902	35-foot Liverpool (P&S)	(Note: 35 ft 0 in (10.67 m) x 10 ft 0 in (3.05 m) (12-oared) Liverpool-class non-self-righting (P&S) lifeboat, legacy of Mr S. W. Hopwood of Westminster, built by Thames Ironworks of Blackwall, London, costing £817.); Previously named Hopwood at Portrush. Transferred to the reserve fleet in 1924. Sold 1930. Renamed Aurora, later Gladrian. Last reported converted as a yacht on the River Thames at Chelsea, June 1977.
1930–1939	626	Arthur Lionel	1912	35-foot Liverpool (P&S)	(Note: 35 ft 0 in (10.67 m) x 10 ft 0 in (3.05 m) (12-oared) Liverpool-class non-self-righting (P&S) lifeboat, legacy of Sir Thomas Tobin of Ballincollig, built by Thames Ironworks of Blackwall, London, costing £1170.); Previously stationed at Saint Peter Port. Sold 1939. Renamed Dorian Rose, later John Briscoe. Last reported at Fishguard, August 1973.

=== Motor lifeboats ===
On station	ON	Name	Built	Class	Comments
1939–1951	816	Kate Greatorex	1939	Surf	Sold 1952. Renamed Suann, later Gannet. Awaiting restoration as Kate Greatorex at Migennes in France, December 2024.
1951–1973	882	B. H. M. H.	1951	Liverpool	Transferred to the relief fleet in 1973, then stationed at Clogherhead from 1981. Sold 1984, renamed Kingfisher, later Jensa. Last reported as Queen Eilene on the River Thames at Chiswick, September 2020.

=== Inshore lifeboats ===
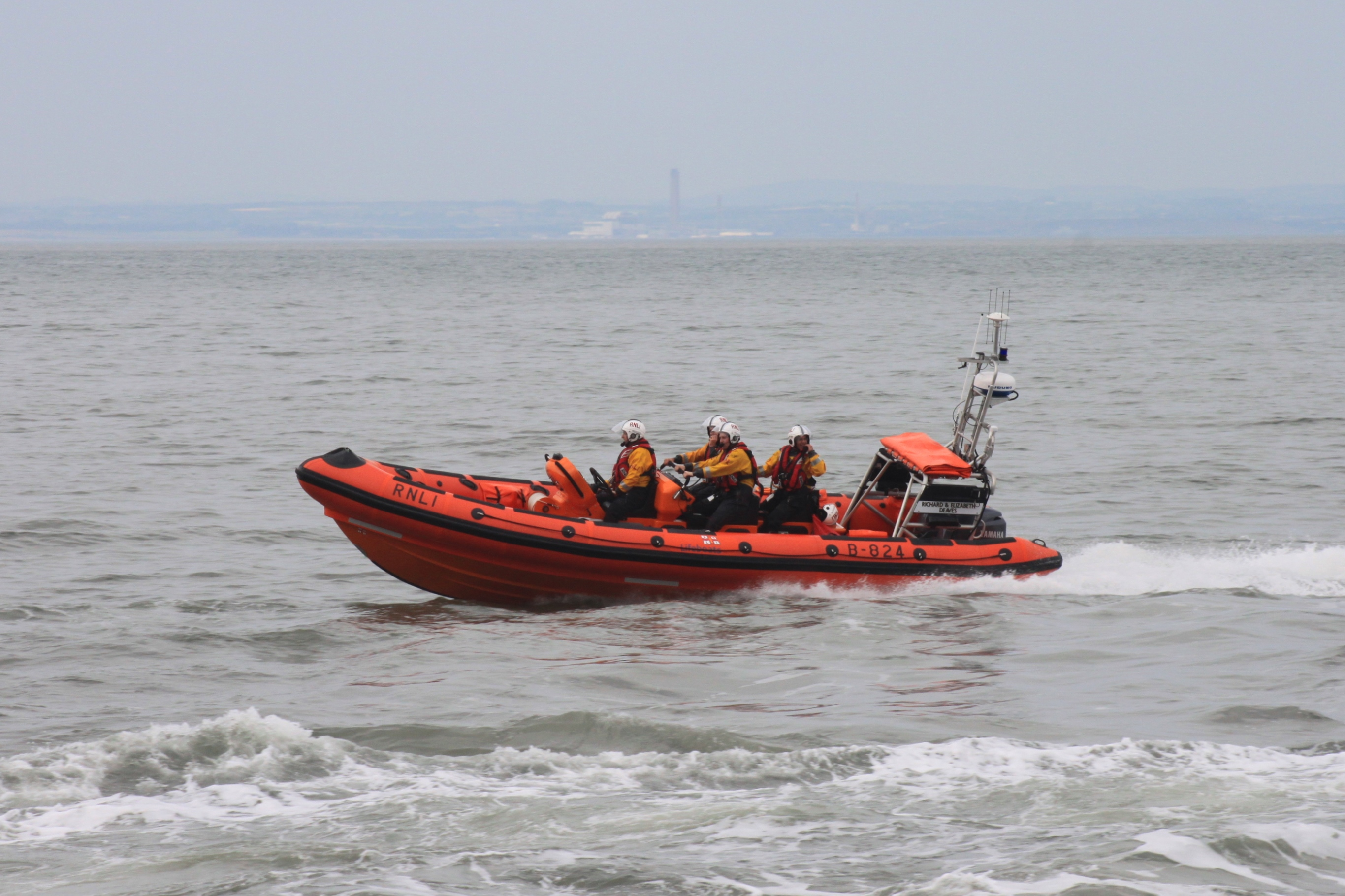
Richard and Elizabeth Deaves (2007–2023)

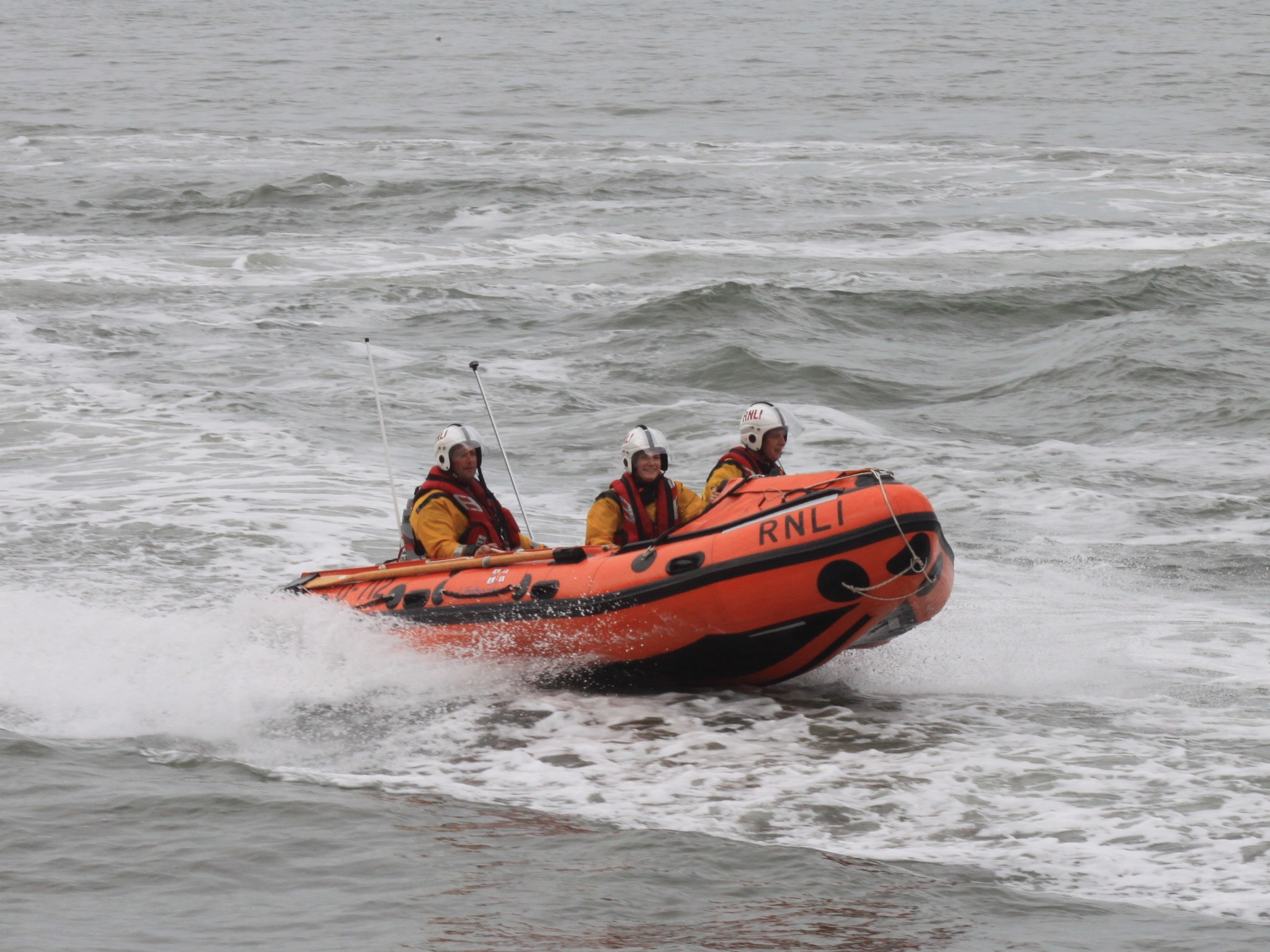
Christine (2009–2020)

==== D-class ====
On station	Op. No. (Note: Op. No. is the RNLI's Operational Number of the boat carried on the hull.)	Name	Class	Comments
1970–1983	D-177	Unnamed	D-class (RFD PB16)	
1984–1992	D-295	Unnamed	D-class (RFD PB16)	
1992–1999	D-420	Leslie D	D-class (EA16)	
1999–2009	D-549	George and Christine	D-class (EA16)	
2009–2020	D-712	Christine	D-class (IB1)	
2020–	D-847	Exmoor Belle	D-class (IB1)	

==== C-class and B-class ====
On station	Op. No.	Name	Class	Comments
1974–1979	C-500	Unnamed	C-class (Zodiac Grand Raid IV)	The first C-class lifeboat in 1972, it initially carried Op. No. D-500.
1979–1994	B-544	Catherine Plumbley	B-class (Atlantic 21)	
1994–2007	B-708	Bessie	B-class (Atlantic 75)	Stationed at Baltimore until 2012.
2007–2023	B-824	Richard and Elizabeth Deaves	B-class (Atlantic 85)	
2023–	B-939	Penny J II	B-class (Atlantic 85)	

=== Launch and recovery tractors ===
On station	Op. No.	Reg. No.	Type	Comments
1939–1950	T4	XA 9192	Clayton	
1950–1957	T54	KXX 566	Case LA	
1957–1964	T39	HYU 16	Case L	
1964–1968	T74	136 HLC	Case 1000D	
1968–1978	T75	AYP 704B	Case 1000D	
1978–1981	T73	500 GYR	Case 1000D	
1981–1983	T69	970 FGP	Case 1000D	
1983–1991	T72	518 GYM	Case 1000D	
1991–1995	T86	SEL 395R	Talus MBC Case 1150B	
1995–1998	T85	SEL 394R	Talus MBC Case 1150B	
1998–2008	T86	SEL 395R	Talus MBC Case 1150B	
2008–2013	T85	SEL 394R	Talus MBC Case 1150B	
2011–2012	TT01	WK60 AUW	Tooltrak Loglogic	
2012–2018	TT09	WA61 HZG	Tooltrak Loglogic	
2013–2014	T89	WEL 302S	Talus MBC Case 1150B	
2014–2018	T90	UJT 491X	Talus MBC Case 1150B	
2018–	TT01	WK60 AUW	Tooltrak Loglogic	
2018–2019	T89	WEL 302S	Talus MBC Case 1150B	
2019–2023	T91	UAW 558Y	Talus MB-H Crawler	
2023–	T101	D335 SUJ	Talus MB-H Crawler	

== See also ==
- List of RNLI stations
- List of former RNLI stations
- Royal National Lifeboat Institution lifeboats
