= Point of Air Lifeboat Station =

Former RNLI lifeboat station in Flintshire, Wales

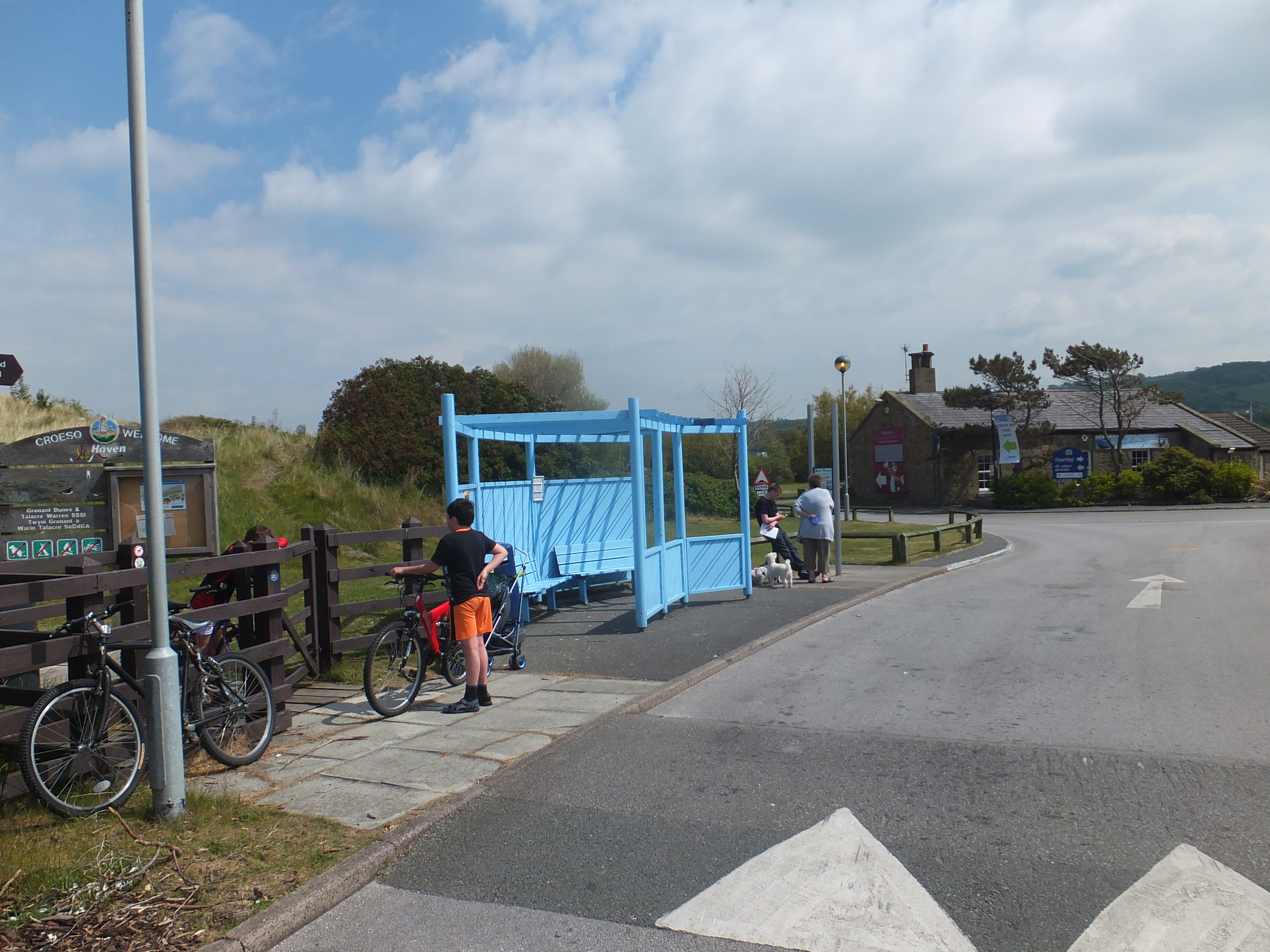
- Former Point of Air Lifeboat Station at Presthaven Holiday Park

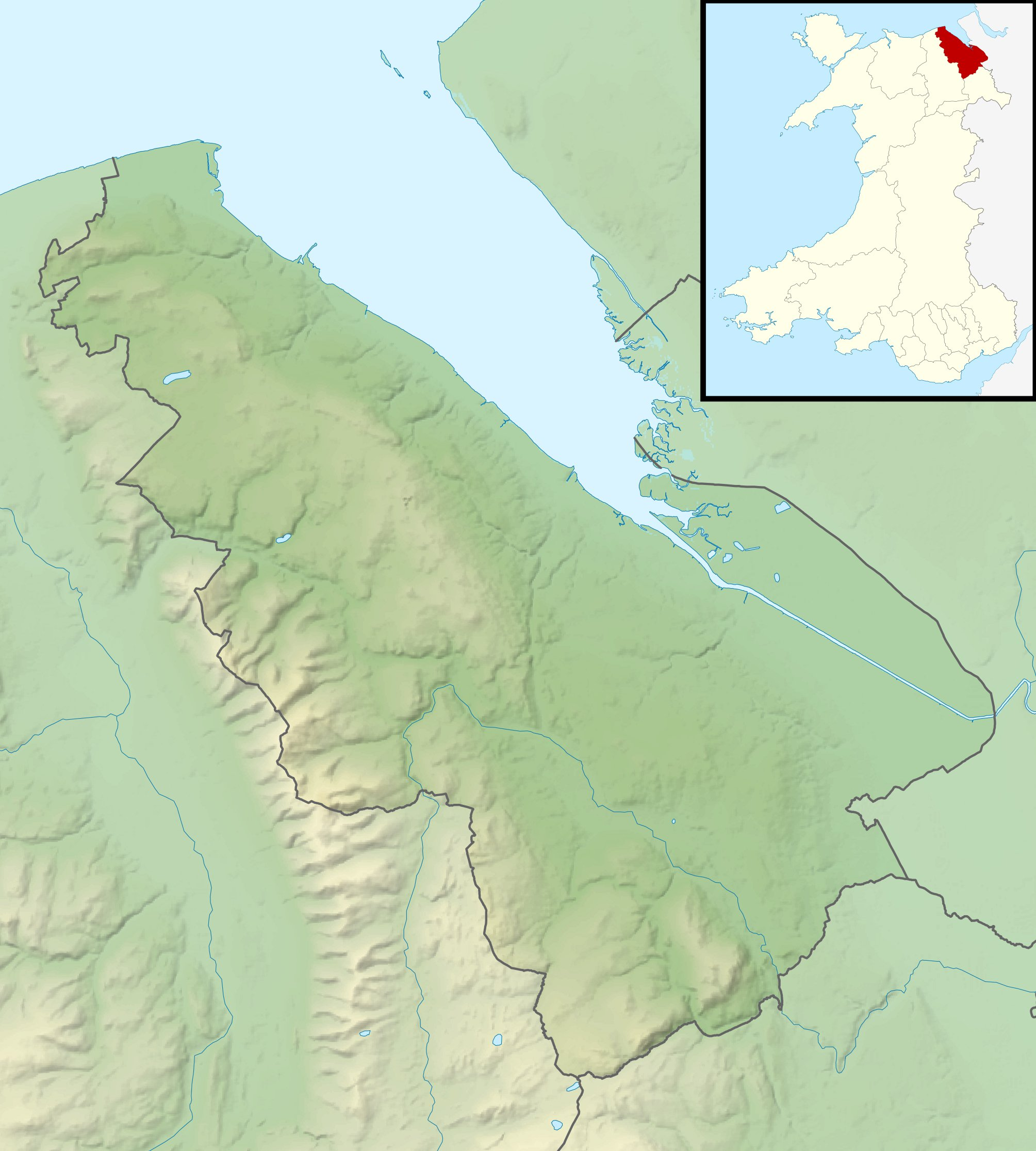
- Location within Flintshire

General information
- Status: Closed
- Type: RNLI Lifeboat Station
- Location: Old Lifeboat House, Shore Road, Gronant, Flintshire, LL19 9TT, Wales
- Coordinates: 53°20′47.6″N 3°22′03.4″W
- Opened: 22 March 1826
- Closed: 30 September 1894

Point of Air Lifeboat Station (Note: Point of Air was used in all references to the lifeboat station operated by the Liverpool Dock Trustees. Following takeover by the RNLI in 1894, and its subsequent relocation, the station was named Point of Ayr. Each location has its own article, see also Point of Ayr Lifeboat Station.) was located on the shore at Gronant, a village situated 2 miles (3.2 km) to the west of the Point of Ayr (or Point of Air, varying sources), the most northerly point of Flintshire and mainland Wales.

A lifeboat was first stationed at Gronant by the Liverpool Dock Trustees in 1826. Management of the station was transferred to the Royal National Lifeboat Institution (RNLI) on 1 July 1894.

The station closed at the end of September 1894, with the RNLI relocating the lifeboat 2 miles (3.2 km) east, to Talacre beach, and renaming the station Point of Ayr Lifeboat Station.

== History ==
On 28 November 1825, the brig Mary was wrecked on the West Hoyle Bank, on passage from Dublin to Liverpool with a cargo of cattle. Just one crewman was rescued, by five men and the keeper of the Point of Ayr Lighthouse, who put out in a small boat.

As a result of this, and other wrecks, and in order to provide further protection for the ships operating in and out of the Port of Liverpool, the Liverpool Dock Trustees established the Point of Air Lifeboat Station in 1826. The station was actually sited at Gronant, 2 miles (3.2 km) to the west of the Point of Air, where the lifeboat could be launched from its carriage into the deep-water channel of "Prestatyn Gulley".

A site for a boathouse was leased for 21 years, from landowner Sir Edward Mostyn, 7th Baronet, at a peppercorn rent of 5/- per annum, and a house with garden was constructed for the Master (coxswain). The Master was employed by the Dock Trustees, receiving a retainer of £7-10s-0d per annum, and paid 7s-6d for an exercise launch, and "appropriate" remuneration for any service launch. Each of the crew would received five guineas per annum, plus 5/- for exercise, and rewards for a service launch. A new unnamed 30-foot lifeboat was sent to the station, arriving on 22 March 1826.

The lifeboat's first, and only, service came on 7 September 1826, when the brig General Brown, on passage from Miramichi, New Brunswick to Liverpool, was badly damaged when she struck Middle Patch. After standing by for many hours, the lifeboat stood down after the vessel re-floated.

In 1830, the 30-foot lifeboat was exchanged with a 26-foot lifeboat from the Magazines lifeboat station on the River Mersey, as the smaller boat was seen to be more suited to carriage launch at Gronant.

When the Athebaska, on passage from Liverpool to Quebec City, was driven onto the West Hoyle Bank during a violent storm and wrecked on 17 April 1838, all of the 25 crew were lost, when none of the lifeboats from Magazines, Hoylake or Point of Air could get close. The Dock Trustees approached local boat builder Thomas Costain, to construct a lifeboat more suitable for the shallow conditions of the River Mersey and River Dee. The resulting broad-beam boat was the first of the 'Liverpool' class of lifeboats, and one was sent to Point of Air as a second boat in 1839. Five years later, in 1844, a new stone-built double boathouse was constructed at Gronant.

On 27 November 1851, the Master (coxswain) at each of the lifeboats stations operated by the Liverpool Dock Trustees, Formby, Liverpool, Magazines, Hoylake, and Point of Air, was awarded the RNIPLS Silver Medal for their gallantry and service over many years. Coxswain Robert Beck of the Point of Air lifeboat, was recorded as having launched over 60 times.

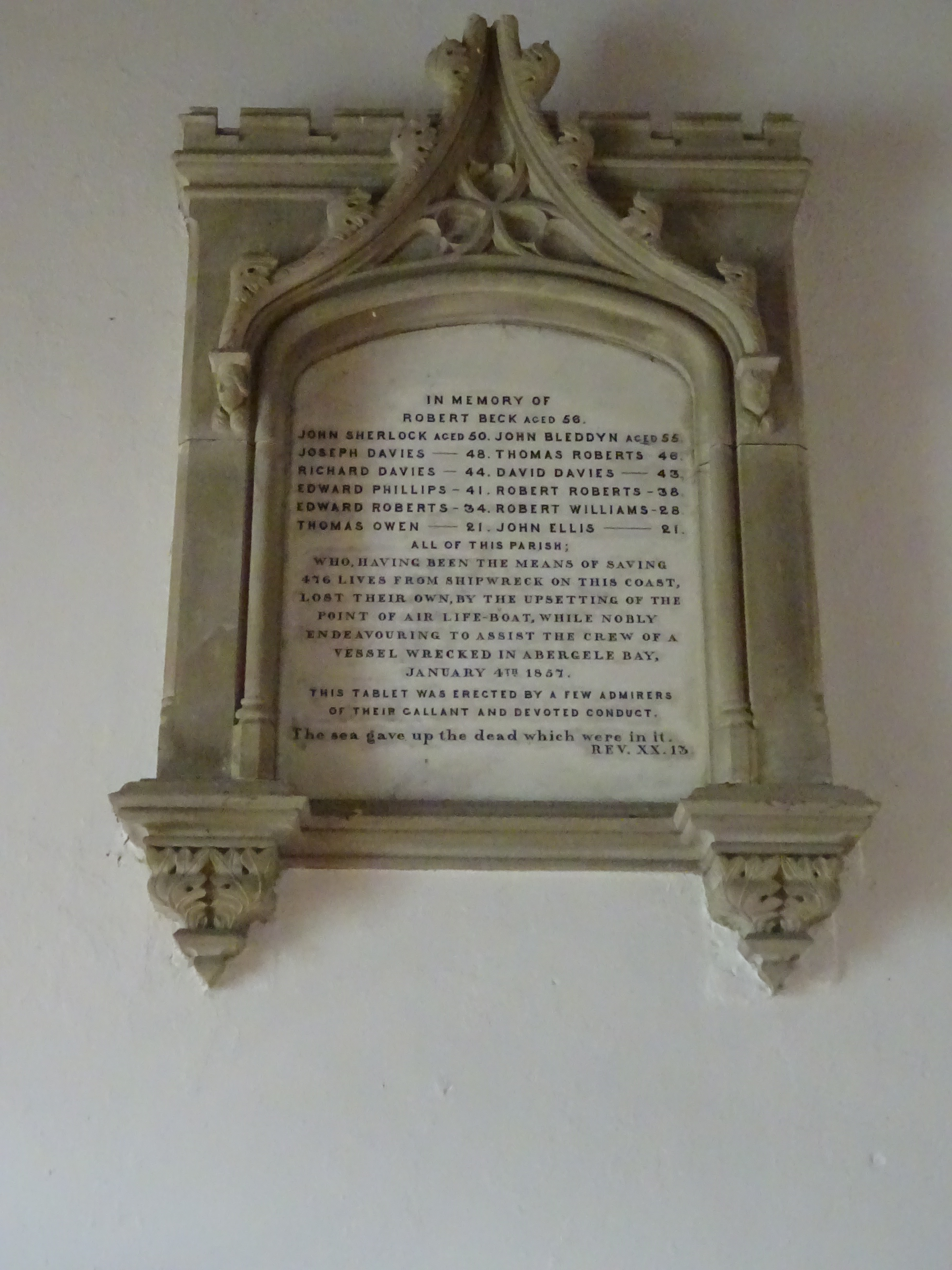
Lifeboat Memorial, Llanasa Church, Flintshire

In full gale-force conditions on 4 January 1857, a number of vessels were in trouble. The Point of Air lifeboat was called at 08:30 to the assistance of a vessel aground on the West Hoyle Bank, but the crew was rescued by the Hoylake lifeboat. They were then sent to a second vessel, aground on Chester Bank, but she re-floated without assistance. At around 11:30, on their way to a third casualty, the schooner Tempest of Belfast, aground off Pensarn at Abergele, the lifeboat capsized. 10 of the 13 crew were immediately washed away and drowned. Onlookers watched helpless as the three remaining lifeboat men managed to cling to the upturned non-self-righting boat for about 40 minutes, before they too were washed away and drowned.

A total of £3,000 was donated to a public fund in aid of their dependents, and a memorial can be found in St Asaph and St Cyndeyrn Parish Church at Llanasa. The lifeboat, which had received little damage, was removed to Liverpool for repairs. A new Master and Mate had been appointed by 29 January, with a new crew formed by 2 February. The lifeboat was collected by the crew from Mostyn Docks, and sailed back to Gronant on 24 February 1857.

Liverpool Dock Trustees handed over control of all their lifeboat stations to the Mersey Docks and Harbour Board in 1858.

In gale force conditions on 7 October 1889, the 1,500 ton barque Mount Pleasant of Christiania, bound for Liverpool from Quebec City with a cargo of timber and 20 crew, ran aground on East Hoyle Bank. The Point of Air lifeboat launched at 13:00, and with great skill, avoiding a mass of wreckage and debris, managed to get a line to the vessel, and was pulled alongside. By 15:00, all 20 crew were rescued. At a ceremony held at the National School in Ffynnongroyw on 3 February 1890, medals for gallantry were awarded to the lifeboat crew by Lord Mostyn, on behalf of the Government of Norway and Sweden.

By the 1890s, with an ever increasing work load due to rising levels of traffic at the Port of Liverpool, negotiations took place between the two parties, and on 1 July 1894, all the remaining Mersey Docks and Harbour Board lifeboat stations, Formby, Hoylake, Hilbre Island and Point of Air, were handed over to the management of the RNLI.

Following the takeover, the old Gronant boathouse was found to be nearly derelict, having suffered regularly from sea ingress. It was decided to relocate the station 2 miles (3.2 km) to the east to Talacre Beach. Point of Air lifeboat station officially closed on 30 September 1894.

The former coxswains residence still stands at Gronant, now incorporated into Presthaven Holiday Park. The No.2 lifeboat was sold from service. The No.1 lifeboat was altered by the RNLI, returning to service as the Point of Ayr No. 2 lifeboat (ON 419) in 1896.

== Station honours ==
The following are awards made at the Point of Air.

- RNIPLS Silver Medal

Robert Beck, Master – 1851

- Silver Medal, second class, awarded by the Government of Norway and Sweden

Benjamin Evans, Master – 1890

- Silver Medal, third class, awarded by the Government of Norway and Sweden

John Silcock, Mate – 1890
William Evans – 1890
Thomas Hughes – 1890
George Jones – 1890
John Jones – 1890
John Lloyd – 1890
Henry Parry – 1890
Edward Roberts – 1890
Robert Roberts – 1890
William Roberts – 1890
John Williams – 1890
Thomas Wilson – 1890

== Roll of honour ==
In memory of those lost whilst serving the Point of Air lifeboat.

- On service to the schooner Tempest of Belfast, 4 January 1857

Robert Beck, Master (58)
John Sherlock, Mate (50)
Joseph Davies (48)
Richard Davies (44)
Edward Philips (41)
Edward Roberts (34)
Thomas Owen (21)

John Bleddyn (55)
Thomas Roberts (46)
David Davies (43)
Robert Roberts (38)
Robert Williams (28)
John Ellis (21)

== Point of Air lifeboats ==
=== No. 1 Station ===
Name	Built	On station	Class	Comments
Unnamed	1826	1826–1830	30-foot Liverpool	(Note: 30-foot x 9-foot 3in (12-oared) Liverpool-class non-self-righting lifeboat, funded from Harbour Dues.)
Unnamed	1827	1830–1870	26-foot 8in Liverpool	(Note: 26-foot 8in x 8-foot 3in (10-oared) Liverpool-class non-self-righting lifeboat, funded from Harbour Dues.); Previously at Magazines lifeboat station.
Unnamed	1870	1870–1894	33-foot Liverpool	(Note: 33-foot x 9-foot 6in (12-oared) Liverpool-class non-self-righting lifeboat, funded from Harbour Dues, built by Thomas Costain, costing £250.); Later numbered (ON 419) at Point of Ayr.

=== No. 2 Station ===
Name	Built	On station	Class	Comments
Unnamed	1839	1839–1864	26-foot 9in Liverpool	(Note: 26-foot 9in x 8-foot 6in (10-oared) Liverpool-class non-self-righting lifeboat, funded from Harbour Dues, built by Thomas Costain of Liverpool.)
Unnamed	1864	1864–1894	33-foot Liverpool	(Note: 33-foot x 9-foot 6in (12-oared) Liverpool-class non-self-righting lifeboat, funded from Harbour Dues, built by Thomas Costain of Liverpool.)

== See also ==
- List of RNLI stations
- List of former RNLI stations
- Royal National Lifeboat Institution lifeboats
