= Groomsport Lifeboat Station =

Former RNLI lifeboat station in County Down, Northern Ireland

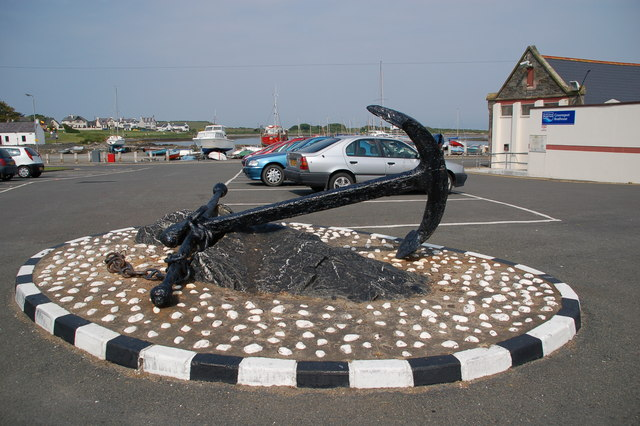
- Groomsport former lifeboat station in background

- Location within Northern Ireland

General information
- Status: Closed
- Type: RNLI Lifeboat Station
- Location: The Harbour, Harbour Road, Groomsport, County Down, BT19 6JR, Northern Ireland
- Coordinates: 54°40′36.4″N 5°36′59.4″W
- Opened: 1858
- Closed: 1920

Groomsport Lifeboat Station was located at the end of Harbour Road, on the quay at Groomsport, a village located at the top of the Ards Peninsula, overlooking Belfast Lough, 15 miles (24 km) north-east of Belfast, in County Down, Northern Ireland.

A lifeboat was first stationed at Groomsport in 1858 by the Royal National Lifeboat Institution (RNLI).

After operating for 62 years, Groomsport Lifeboat Station closed in 1920.

== History ==
On 26 January 1829, the sloop Friends was wrecked on Cockle Island, just off Groomsport. A boat of H.M. Coastguard put out, but unable to get close, decided to land on the island, and burn two lights as a guide. The four crew of the sloop then set out towards the lights in their own small boat, but although it was capsized, managed to make it ashore. Lt. John Alphonso Henry, RN, H.M. Coastguard was awarded the RNIPLS Silver Medal.

It would not be until 1858, that a lifeboat station was established at Groomsport. The location was though appropriate, sitting at the entrance to Belfast Lough, "to afford a protection to the shipping frequenting that prosperous trading mart." A branch of the Institution was established, and a 28-foot 6-oared unnamed 'Pulling and Sailing' (P&S) lifeboat, one with oars and sails, was placed on service. A carriage for transportation was also supplied. A boathouse was constructed, at a cost of £150, on ground granted by J. W. Maxwell, funded by monies raised locally, and by residents of Belfast. Annual contributions towards the usual expenses of the establishment were also forthcoming.

Groomsport received a larger 32-foot 10-oared lifeboat in 1867, the smaller 26-foot boat ultimately found to be unsuitable for the location. A new launch carriage was also provided, and the lifeboat was transported to the station free of charge, thanks to the London and Belfast Steam Ship Company. A gift to the Institution by a 'benevolent English lady', the lifeboat was named Florence at her request.

Whilst trying to enter Belfast port in a strong north-north-west gale on 14 October 1881, the barque Margaret, on passage from Quebec, was taken in tow by a steam-tug, but ran aground after the rope parted. The Groomsport lifeboat Florence was taken overland to Bangor, where she was launched and rescued the crew of 15.

On 16 June 1897, a message was received from Bangor, alerting the lifeboat station that two vessels were in need of assistance. Transported to Bangor on the carriage, the lifeboat George Pooley (ON 92) was then launched off the pier, into a strong gale. Setting anchor, the lifeboat veered down to the smack Harp, and rescued the crew of four. The lifeboat then went to the aid of the schooner Hollyhow, again veering down, and rescuing the eight people aboard, including the Master, his wife and three children, and three crew. All 12 were landed safely in Ballyholm Bay. In recognition of their service, additional monetary awards were made to the lifeboat crew.

On passage from Ayr to Wexford, the schooner Caledonia was stranded on Briggs reef on 21 February 1899, and started to take on water. Launched at 05:40 into a gale, the crew of five were rescued by the Groomsport lifeboat George Pooley (ON 92).

Chapman (ON 461), a 35-foot 12-oared Liverpool-class non-self-righting (P&S) lifeboat was placed at Groomsport in 1901. On 27 February 1903, she was launched just after 09:00 to the barque Hjertness of Sandefjord, on passage from New Zealand to Glasgow with a cargo of timber, signalling for "immediate assistance", 1 mile (1.6 km) north-west of the Copeland Islands. Too rough to go alongside, the lifeboat went under the stern, and the 12 crew, the pilot, and a dog named 'Amon', were lowered down ropes to the awaiting lifeboat. Making sail back to Groomsport, the lifeboat was able to gain a tow with a tug boat.

Groomsport Lifeboat Station was closed in 1920. The lifeboat house is still standing, and is currently used as a community hall. The last lifeboat on service, Chapman (ON 461), was initially placed in the relief fleet, before serving at Hilbre Island until 1938. Now the oldest surviving 'pulling and sailing' Liverpool-class lifeboat, she was restored by John Parr in 1998, and currently resides in the Lifeboat Museum at Lytham.

== Station honours ==
The following are awards made at Groomsport, Co. Down.

- RNIPLS Silver Medal

Lt. John Alphonso Henry, RN, H.M. Coastguard – 1829

== Groomsport lifeboats ==
=== Pulling and Sailing (P&S) lifeboats ===
ON (Note: ON is the RNLI's Official Number of the boat.)	Name	Built	On station	Class	Comments
Pre-327	Unnamed	1858	1858–1867	28-foot Peake Self-righting (P&S)	(Note: 28-foot x 6-foot (6-oared) Peake-class self-righting (P&S) lifeboat, built by Forrestt of Limehouse, London, costing £130.)
Pre-503	Florence	1867	1867–1885	32-foot Prowse Self-righting (P&S)	(Note: 32-foot x 7-foot 6in (10-oared) Prowse-class self-righting (P&S) lifeboat, an anonymous gift, built by Forrestt of Limehouse, London, costing £246.)
92	George Pooley	1884	1885–1901	34-foot Self-righting (P&S)	(Note: 34-foot x 7-foot 6in (10-oared) self-righting (P&S) lifeboat, legacy of Mr J. Pooley of Hadleigh, Forrestt of Limehouse, London, costing £330.)
461	Chapman	1901	1901–1920	35-foot Liverpool Non-self-righting (P&S)	(Note: 35-foot x 10-foot (12-oared) Liverpool-class non-self-righting (P&S) lifeboat, legacy of Mrs M. A. Chapman of West Brompton, built by Thames Ironworks of Blackwall, London, costing £922.)

Pre ON numbers are unofficial numbers used by the Lifeboat Enthusiast Society to reference early lifeboats not included on the official RNLI list.

== See also ==
- List of RNLI stations
- List of former RNLI stations
- Royal National Lifeboat Institution lifeboats
