= Tyrella Lifeboat Station =

Former RNLI lifeboat station in County Down, Northern Ireland

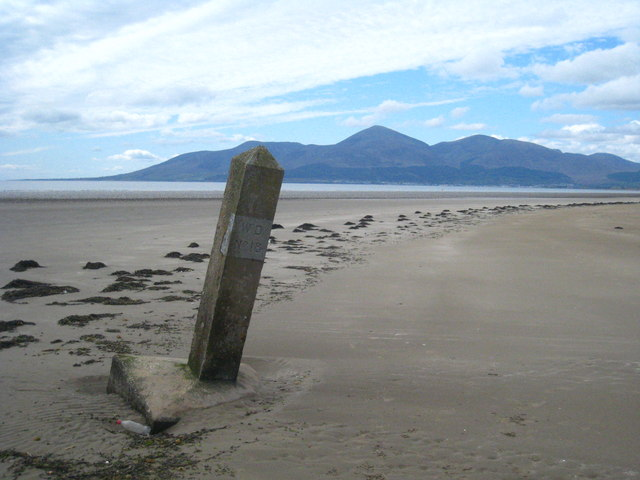
- Tyrella beach

- Location within Northern Ireland

General information
- Status: Closed
- Type: RNLI Lifeboat Station
- Location: Tyrella, County Down, Northern Ireland
- Coordinates: 54°14′53.1″N 5°45′56.5″W
- Opened: RNLIPS 1838–1851; RNLI 1860–1899
- Closed: 1899

Tyrella Lifeboat Station was located near the beach, in the parish of Tyrella, close to the village of Ballykinler, overlooking Dundrum Bay, on the coast of County Down in Northern Ireland.

A lifeboat was first stationed at Tyrella in 1838 by the Royal National Institution for the Preservation of Life from Shipwreck (RNIPLS), but had ceased to operate by 1851. A new lifeboat station was established by the Royal National Lifeboat Institution (RNLI) in 1860.

After operating for 39 years, Tyrella Lifeboat Station closed in 1899.

== History ==
A lifeboat was first placed at Tyrella in 1838 by the Royal National Institution for the Preservation of Life from Shipwreck (RNIPLS). No details of any service carried out by the lifeboat have been found. Fortunes of the Institution began to wane during the 1840s, especially following the death of its founder, Sir William Hillary, Bt. in 1847, and many stations ceased to operate. It is recorded that the Tyrella lifeboat had ceased to operate by 1851.

The RNIPLS was revitalised in the early 1850s, primarily down to the efforts of president Algernon Percy, 4th Duke of Northumberland, and secretary Richard Lewis, with the Institution changing its name to the Royal National Lifeboat Institution (RNLI) in 1854.

At the meeting of the RNLI committee of management on Thursday 2 February 1860, it was announced that the Institution had received a donation from an anonymous lady, sufficient to supply lifeboats and equipment for St Ives, Newquay, Buckie and Tyrella, and that stations were to be established at each location if practical.

In the January 1861 edition of the RNLI journal 'The Lifeboat', it was announced that a station had been established at Tyrella, where a boathouse had been constructed at a cost of £90, on land provided by A. H. Montgomery of Tyrella House. A 30-foot Peake-class self-righting 'Pulling and Sailing (P&S) lifeboat, one with sails and (6) oars, and costing £156-12, had been sent to the station, transported to Belfast free of charge by the Belfast Screw Steam-packet Company. The lifeboat was named Tyrella.

In 1866, a larger 10-oared lifeboat was placed at Tyrella. Formerly stationed at Poolbeg, the previously unnamed lifeboat was again given the name Tyrella.

On 29 November 1874, the brigantine Donna Maria of Belfast, on passage from Belfast to Liverpool, was driven ashore and wrecked in Dundrum Bay in a south-east gale. The Tyrella lifeboat launched in the middle of the night, and rescued five crew. A sixth man was trapped by a timber. Assistant Coxswain Gordon went aboard and sawed through the wood, whilst the lifeboat landed the other five crew members. The lifeboat then returned, and both men were taken off, and landed on shore soon after daybreak. For this service, Coxswain Adam Murphy and Second Coxswain John Gordon were each awarded the RNLI Silver Medal.

By 1875, it was seen that the 13-year-old lifeboat was deteriorating, and it was replaced with a 30-foot 8-oared lifeboat, along with new transporting carriage. The lifeboat was funded from a gift of the Misses Frances and Kate Peach of Langley Hall in Derbyshire, from the sale of their needlework. At a ceremony on 17 December 1875, the lifeboat was named Memorial.

The fourth and last boat to be placed at Tyrella, was a much larger 34-foot 10-oared lifeboat. The costs were defrayed from the gift of Mrs Cameron of Ripon, the wife of the former Inspecting Commander of H.M. Coastguard at Newcastle, County Down, Capt. Cameron, RN, with the monies raised over 10 or 11 years by the sale of her own work. Both Capt. and Mrs Cameron were present for the naming ceremony on 13 June 1888, where in accordance with her wishes, she named the lifeboat Louisa Burnaby (ON 159).

At a meeting of the RNLI committee of management on Thursday 12 October 1899, it was decided that Tyrella Lifeboat Station would be abolished, although a new station, Killough would be (re) established at Rossglass, just 4 miles (6.4 km) to the east.

The station building still stands in an isolated field near Tyrella House. The lifeboat on station at the time of closure, Louisa Burnaby (ON 159), was sold from service in 1900. No further details of the boat are available.

== Station honours ==
The following are awards made at Tyrella, Co. Down.

- RNLI Silver Medal

Adam Murphy, Coxswain – 1875
John Gordon, Second Coxswain – 1875

== Tyrella lifeboats ==
| ON (Note: ON is the RNLI's Official Number of the boat.) | Name | Built | On station | Class | Comments |
|---|---|---|---|---|---|
| Pre-179 | Unnamed | 1838 | 1838–c.1851 | 22-foot North Country Non-self-righting | (Note: 22-foot x 7-foot North Country non-self-righting lifeboat, funded by the Board of Public Works.) |
Station Closed 1851–1860
| Pre-366 | Tyrella | 1860 | 1860–1866 | 30-foot Peake Self-righting (P&S) | (Note: 30-foot x 7-foot (6-oared) Peake-class self-righting (P&S) lifeboat, gift of an anonymous 'lady', built by Forrest of Limehouse, London, costing £157.) |
| Pre-391 | Tyrella | 1862 | 1866–1875 | 30-foot Peake Self-righting (P&S) | (Note: 30-foot x 7-foot 2in (10-oared) Peake-class self-righting (P&S) lifeboat, gift of an anonymous 'lady', built by Forrest of Limehouse, London, costing £152 when new.); Previously at Poolbeg. |
| Pre-602 | Memorial | 1875 | 1875–1888 | 30-foot Montrose Self-righting (P&S) | (Note: 30-foot x 8-foot (8-oared) Montrose-class (Prowse) self-righting (P&S) lifeboat, gift of the Misses F. and K. Peach of Derbyshire, built by Woolfe of Shadwell, London, costing £275.) |
| 159 | Louisa Burnaby | 1888 | 1888–1899 | 34-foot Self-righting (P&S) | (Note: 34-foot x 7-foot 6in (10-oared) self-righting (P&S) lifeboat, gift of Mrs Cameron of Kingston upon Thames, built by Watkins of Blackwall, London, costing £365.) |

Pre ON numbers are unofficial numbers used by the Lifeboat Enthusiast Society to reference early lifeboats not included on the official RNLI list.

== See also ==
- List of RNLI stations
- List of former RNLI stations
- Royal National Lifeboat Institution lifeboats
