= Killough Lifeboat Station =

Former RNLI lifeboat station in County Down, Northern Ireland

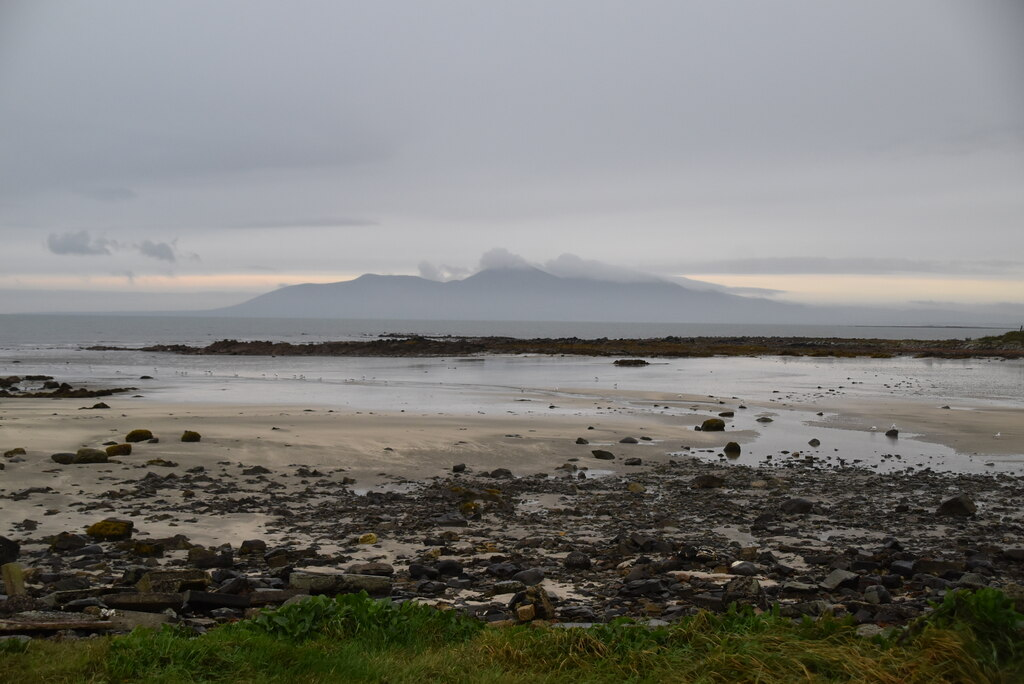
- Rossglass beach

- Location within Northern Ireland

General information
- Status: Closed
- Type: RNLI Lifeboat Station
- Location: Rossglass, Killough, County Down, Northern Ireland
- Coordinates: 54°14′25.9″N 5°40′20.0″W
- Opened: 1825–1835 Rossglass; 1835–1843 St Johns Point; 1901–1914 Killough (Rossglass)
- Closed: 1914

Killough Lifeboat Station was actually located at Rossglass, 3.2 kilometres (2.0 mi) from Killough, overlooking Dundrum Bay, on the coast of County Down in Northern Ireland.

A lifeboat was first stationed at Rossglass in 1825 by the Royal National Institution for the Preservation of Life from Shipwreck (RNIPLS). The station relocated to St John's Point in 1835, operating for another eight years. A new Killough Lifeboat Station was established at Rossglass by the Royal National Lifeboat Institution (RNLI) in 1901, following the closure of the station at Tyrella in 1899.

After operating for just 13 years, Killough Lifeboat Station closed in 1914.

== History ==
Rossglass Lifeboat Station was established at Rossglass, Co. Down by the Royal National Institution for the Preservation of Life from Shipwreck (RNIPLS) in 1825.

On 1 or 2 December 1825, the vessel Usk was wrecked off Rossglass, whilst on passage from Liverpool to Adra, Spain. Three of the crew were lost, but seven were rescued. Lifeboat Coxswain Thomas Foy was later awarded the RNIPLS Silver Medal.

On passage from New Brunswick to Liverpool, the ship Sir James Kemp was wrecked in Dundrum Bay on 4 December 1829. Four boats, including the Rossglass lifeboat and the local coastguard boat, were launched. The Master, a woman and infant, and 12 crew were rescued. Volunteers Michael Casey and John Phillips were each awarded the RNIPLS Silver Medal.

In 1835, the Rossglass station was closed, and the lifeboat was relocated to St John's Point Lifeboat Station, just 2.4 km (1.5 mi) to the south, at the tip of the peninsula, where Saint John's Point coastguard station was in operation. It remained in operation until 1843, when the lifeboat was condemned and sold. Likely due to the declining fortunes of the RNIPLS in the 1840s, the lifeboat was not replaced, and the station closed. It is reported that a private lifeboat operated at Rossglass until 1854, but no further details are available.

The RNIPLS was revitalised in the early 1850s, primarily down to the efforts of president Algernon Percy, 4th Duke of Northumberland, and secretary Richard Lewis, with the Institution changing its name to the Royal National Lifeboat Institution (RNLI) in 1854.

At a meeting of the RNLI committee of management on Thursday 12 October 1899, it was decided that the Tyrella Lifeboat Station would be abolished, and that a new station was intended to be (re)-established at Rossglass.

In the RNLI journal 'The Lifeboat' of 1 February 1902, it was reported that the station had been established at Rossglass, where a boathouse with watch room and committee room had been constructed, at a cost of £977-15s-9d. A 35-foot Liverpool-class non-self-righting 'Pulling and Sailing' (P&S) lifeboat, one with sails and (12) oars, double banked, with two drop keels, was sent to the station in 1901. When required, the crew would be brought from Killough. A new carriage was also supplied, which would allow transportation to any site suitable for launch, and would also allow the lifeboat to be transported to Killough once-a-year, for one of her quarterly exercises. In accordance with the wishes of the local residents, the station was to be known as Killough Lifeboat Station.

The lifeboat was funded from a legacy of £1050 received by the Institution, from the estate of the late Mrs. Helen Groome of Liverpool, and in accordance with her wishes, the lifeboat was named John Groome (ON 460).

Operating for just 13 years, at the meeting of the RNLI committee of management on Thursday 12 February 1914, it was decided to close Killough Lifeboat Station. It is believed that the boathouse is still in use as a private residence. The lifeboat on station at the time of closure, John Groome (ON 460), was placed in the reserve fleet, later serving at Point of Ayr, before being sold from service in 1925. The boat was reported as a yacht in Portree in the 1930s, but is believed to have been broken up in Mochdre, North Wales in 2012.

== Station honours ==
The following are awards made at Rossglass and St John's Point, Co. Down.

- RNIPLS Gold Medal

Capt. Philip R. M. Browne, RN, H.M. Coastguard, St John's Point – 1838

Lt. Henry Frederick Sewell, RN, H.M. Coastguard, St John's Point – 1840

- RNLI Silver Medal

Thomas Foy, Coxswain – 1827

John Phillips, coastguard boat volunteer, St John's Point – 1830
Michael Casey, coastguard boat volunteer, St John's Point – 1830

John Adam, Chief Officer, H.M. Coastguard, St John's Point – 1837 (Second-service clasp)
John Strains, Chief Officer, H.M. Coastguard, St John's Point – 1837
William Hogg, Boatman, H.M. Coastguard, St John's Point – 1837
William Adair, Boatman, H.M. Coastguard, St John's Point – 1837
Capt. Philip R. M. Browne – 1837

George MacDonald, Boatman, H.M. Coastguard, St John's Point – 1840

- RNLI Silver Medal

Henry Boyd, H.M. Coastguard, St John's Point – 1860

== Lifeboats ==
=== Rossglass ===
ON (Note: ON is the RNLI's Official Number of the boat.)	Name	Built	On station	Class	Comments
Pre-110	Unnamed	1825	1825–1835	18-foot Plenty Non-self-righting	(Note: 18-foot x 6-foot 6in Plenty-class non-self-righting lifeboat, built by William Plenty of Newbury, Berkshire, costing £90.)

Station Closed, 1835
Pre ON numbers are unofficial numbers used by the Lifeboat Enthusiast Society to reference early lifeboats not included on the official RNLI list.

=== St John's Point ===
ON	Name	Built	On station	Class	Comments
Pre-110	Unnamed	1825	1835–1843	18-foot Plenty Non-self-righting	(Note: 18-foot x 6-foot 6in Plenty-class non-self-righting lifeboat, built by William Plenty of Newbury, Berkshire, costing £90.); Previously at Rossglass.

Station Closed, 1843

=== Killough (Rossglass) ===
ON	Name	Built	On station	Class	Comments
460	John Groome	1900	1901–1914	35-foot Liverpool non-self-righting (P&S)	(Note: 35-foot x 10-foot (12-oared) Liverpool-class non-self-righting (P&S) lifeboat, legacy of Mrs H. Groome of Liverpool, built by Thames Ironworks of Blackwall, London, costing £931.)

== See also ==
- List of RNLI stations
- List of former RNLI stations
- Royal National Lifeboat Institution lifeboats
