= Hoylake Lifeboat Station =

RNLI lifeboat station in Merseyside, England

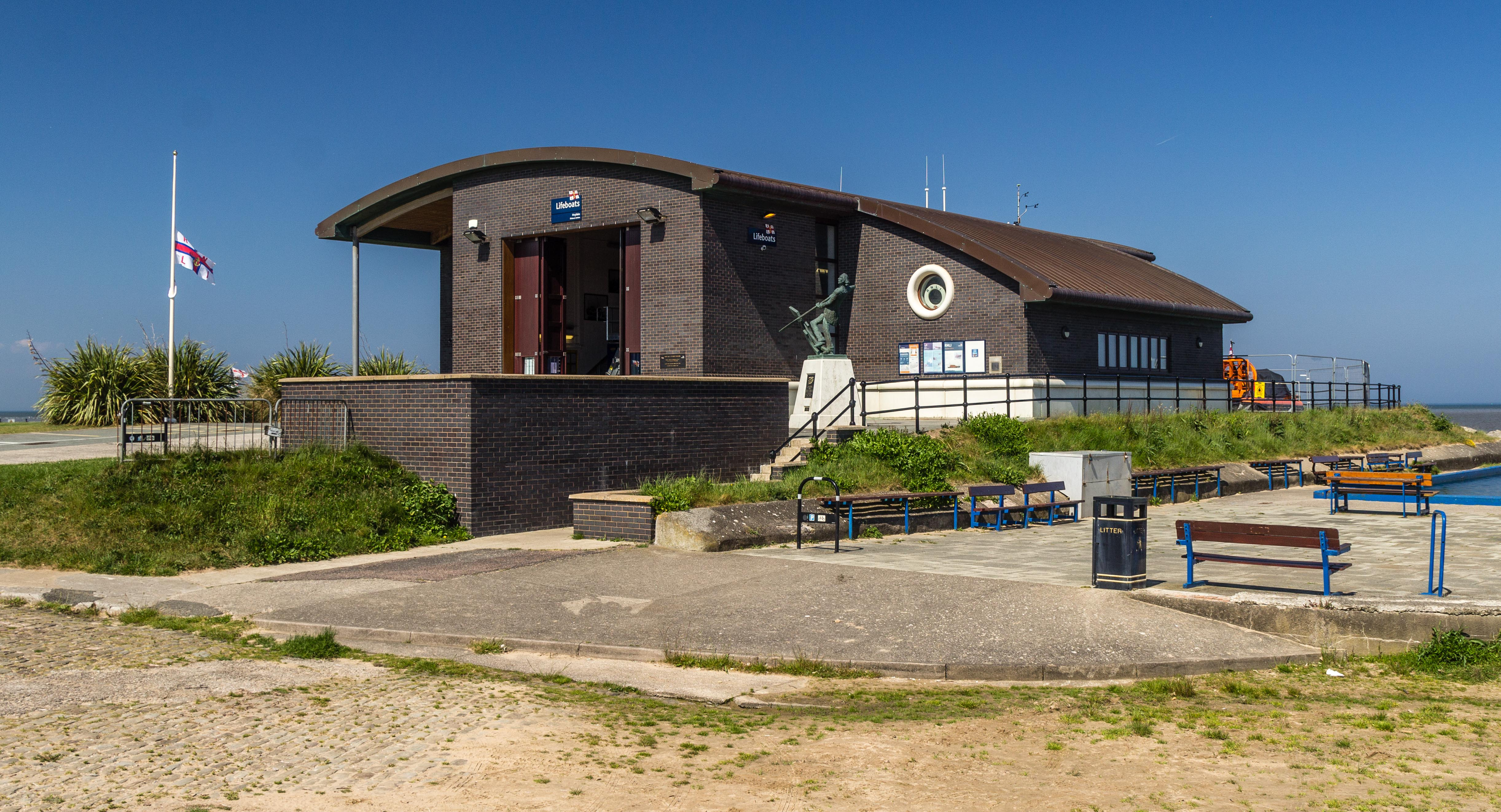
- Hoylake Lifeboat Station in 2017

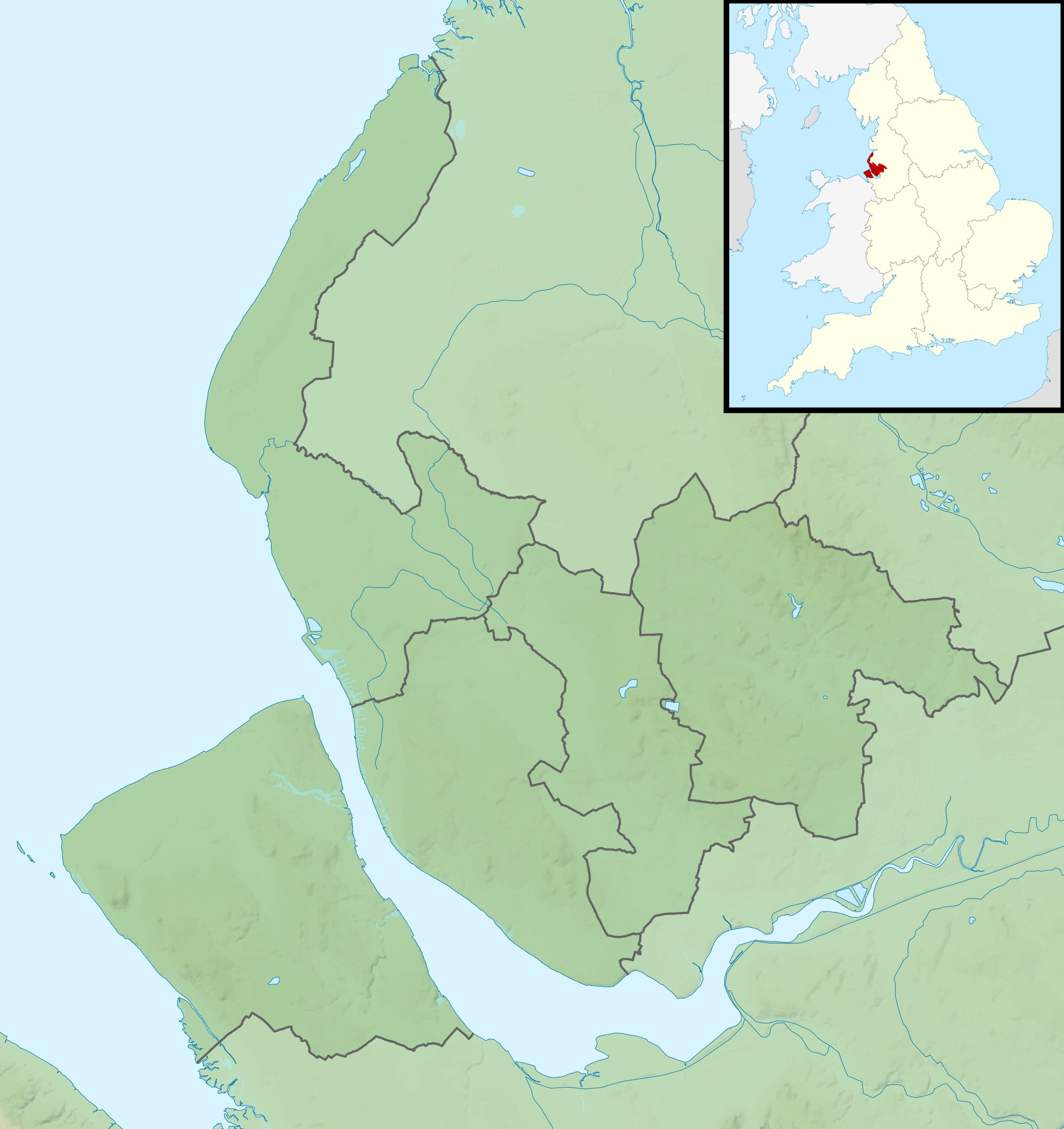
- Location within Merseyside

General information
- Type: RNLI Lifeboat Station
- Location: Hoylake Lifeboat Station, 55 North Parade, Hoylake, Wirral, Merseyside, CH47 3AL, England
- Coordinates: 53°23′57.0″N 3°10′38.9″W
- Opened: 1803 Liverpool Dock Trustees; 1894 RNLI
- Owner: Royal National Lifeboat Institution

Website
- Hoylake RNLI Lifeboat Station

Hoylake Lifeboat Station is located on the North Parade promenade in Hoylake, a town on the Wirral Peninsula, in Merseyside.

A lifeboat was first stationed at Hoylake by the Liverpool Dock Trustees in 1803. The station was transferred to the management of the Royal National Lifeboat Institution (RNLI) in 1894.

The station currently operates 13-06 Edmund Hawthorne Micklewood (ON 1313), a Shannon-class All-weather lifeboat, and Hurley Spirit (H-005), a Griffon Type 470TD Hovercraft.

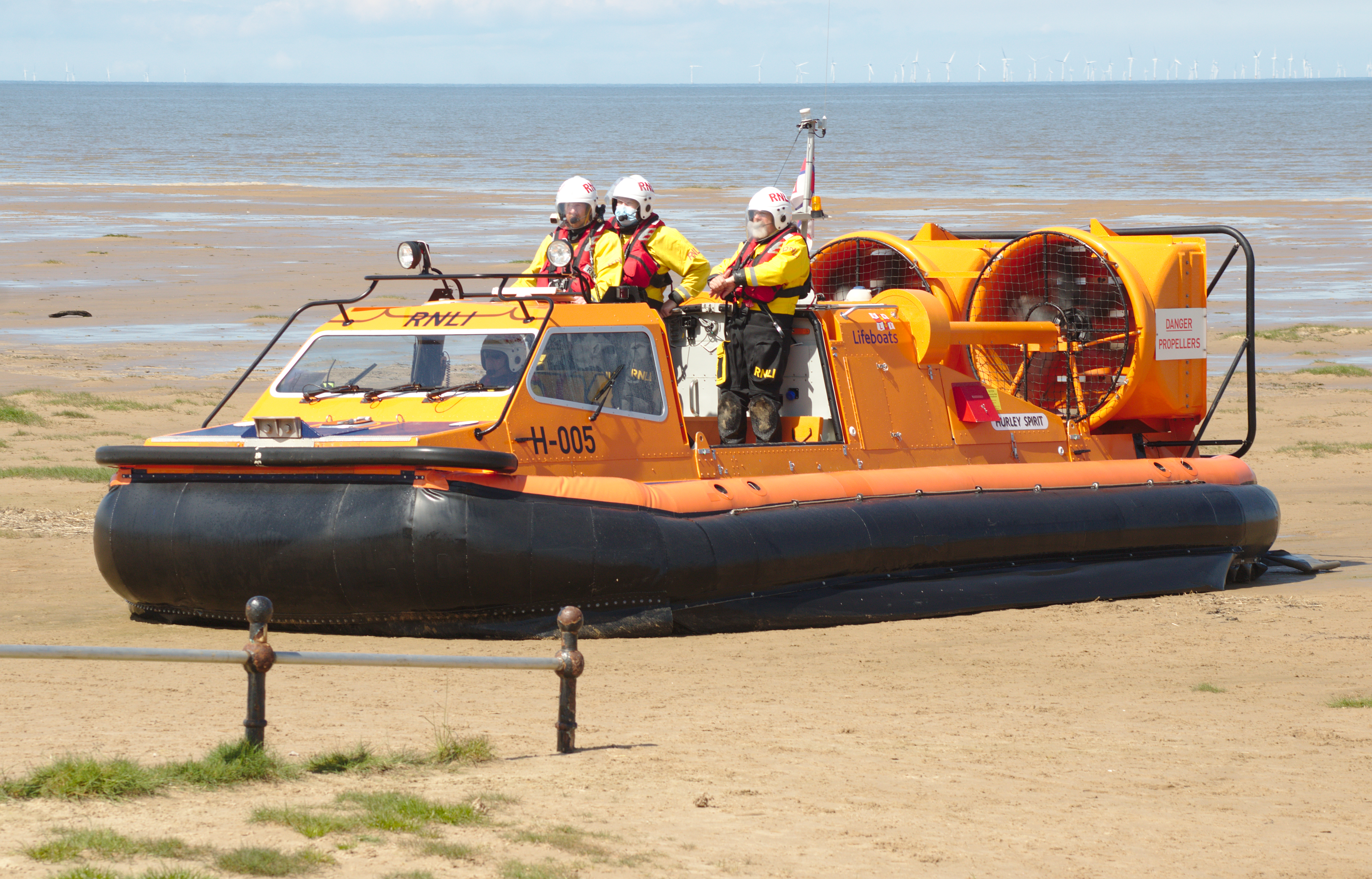
Hovercraft H-005 Hurley Spirit on Hoylake beach

== History ==
On 16 September 1803, the Liverpool Dock Trustees ordered that a lifeboat, purchased from Henry Greathead in 1802, be placed in service at Hoylake, one of 6 lifeboat stations in the area provided by the Dock Trustees. The boat was to be housed in a newly constructed wooden boathouse, under the supervision of the local Tide Surveyor, Mr. Marlowe. The first Master (coxswain) was Thomas Seed, Lower Lighthouse Keeper. Thomas Seed died in 1808, and the Dock Trustees appointed Capt. Joseph Bennett, already an experienced Liverpool pilot, as Master of Hoylake lifeboat, and Keeper of the Lower Lighthouse, on a salary of 40 guineas.

With enormous waves battering the beach, Hoylake's Greathead-class lifeboat was launched on the 29 December 1810, to the aid of the ship Traveller, on passage from Demerara to Liverpool, when she was driven ashore on the Hoyle Bank. Rowing out to the vessel, the lifeboat capsized. Eight crew were lost. A memorial now sits outside Hoylake lifeboat station.

Following an wreck of the Athebaska in 1838, when none of the lifeboats from Hoylake, Point of Air or Magazine village were able to effect a rescue, with the loss of all aboard, the Dock Trustees decided to place a No.2 boat at Hoylake in 1840, specially constructed by local boat-builder Thomas Costain to suit the local conditions. So pleased were the crew with the new boat, they requested another one, to replace their No.1 boat, which arrived in 1841.

By 1847, launching of either Hoylake boat was proving difficult at certain times due to silting. So it was decided to create a station on Hilbre Island. A stone built boathouse and slipway were constructed, a caretaker was appointed to live on the island, and in 1848, the Hoylake No.2 boat was transferred to Hilbre Island.

Liverpool Dock Trustees handed over control of all their lifeboat stations to the Mersey Docks and Harbour Board in 1858. However, by the 1890s, with an ever increasing work load due to rising levels of port traffic at Liverpool, negotiations took place between the two parties, and on 1 July 1894, all the Mersey Docks and Harbour Board lifeboat stations were handed over to the RNLI. The Hoylake boat was only two-years-old, so after being sent away for some modification work, the boat was returned to Hoylake and was named Coard William Squarey (ON 377).

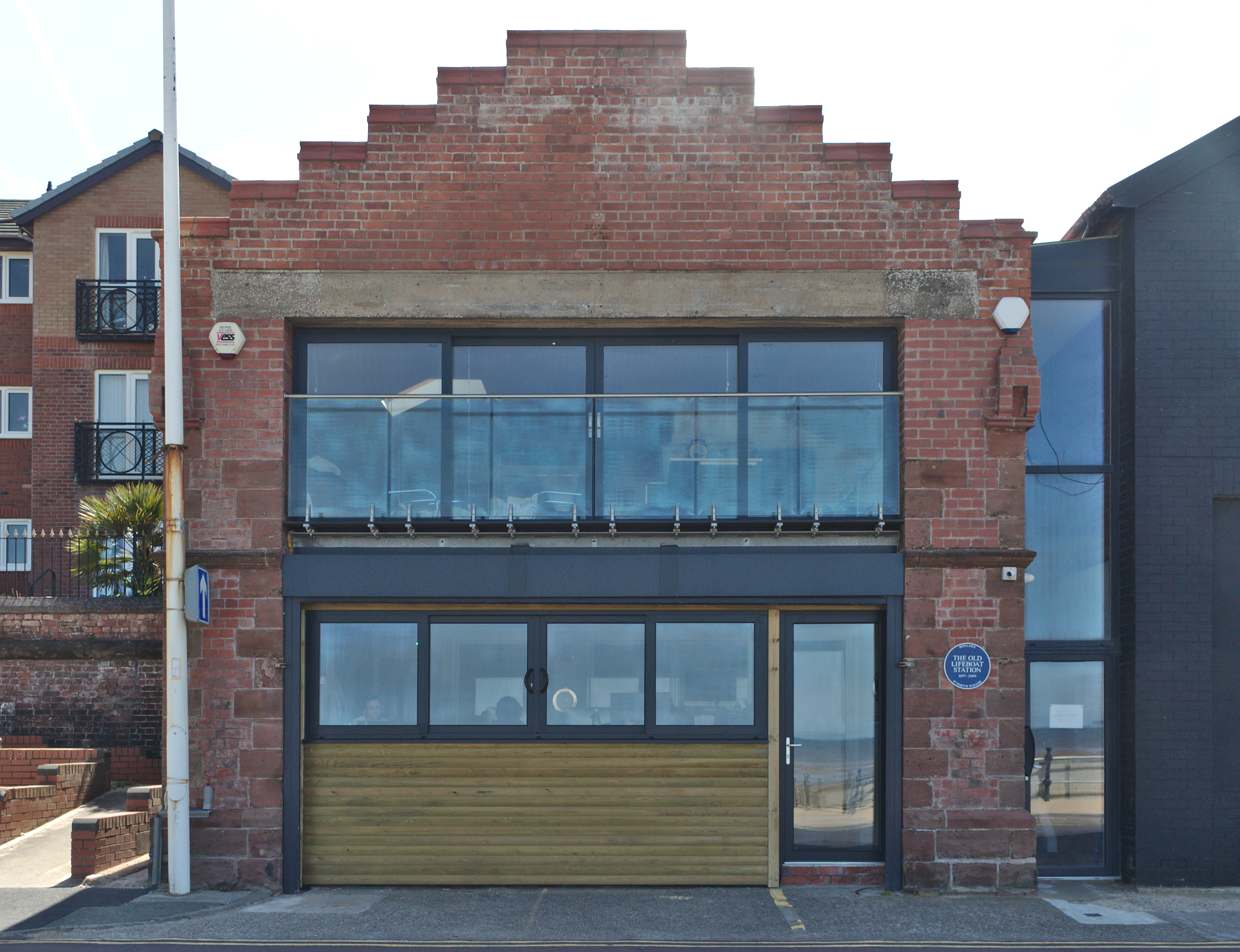
1898 Boathouse

In 1898, the RNLI gave up their existing wooden boat house and site, to allow Hoylake Council to create an Esplanade. A new site was provided by the Mersey Docks and Harbour Board, and the council paid £200 towards the construction of a new lifeboat station, which cost £922, and was completed in 1899. The council also constructed a new slipway opposite the new boathouse at no cost to the RNLI.

Hoylake was one of the first stations to trial a launch tractor, receiving a Clayton tractor (T1) in 1921. They also got a new lifeboat in 1931, Oldham (ON 750). She was the first of the new motor-powered Liverpool-class lifeboats, with a single 35-hp engine, capable of 7.3 knots.

The first of thirteen Fowler Challenger III amphibious tractors was introduced at Hoylake in 1953.

With motor lifeboats at Hoylake and New Brighton, and one due at Rhyl, it was considered that there was enough lifeboat coverage for the area, and it was announced that Hilbre Island lifeboat station would close in 1938.

Nearly 110 years since the building of Hoylake's 1899 lifeboat station, at a cost of £922, a new station was constructed on the site of Hoylake's old open air baths in 2008, located about half a mile to the east of the old station, on the sea-side of North Parade. It followed two years of fundraising, and cost £2million to construct.

In 2014, the long-serving Mersey-class lifeboat 12-005 Lady of Hilbre (ON 1163) was withdrawn from service. She was replaced by a brand-new state-of-the-art Shannon-class All-weather lifeboat, 13-06 Edmund Hawthorne Micklewood (ON 1313), and the special launch rig, known as the Shannon Launch and Recovery System or SLARS. The lifeboat, costing £2million, is 50% faster than the previous lifeboat, and is capable of 25 knots (46 km/h; 29 mph). Along with other donations, the lifeboat was primarily funded from the legacy of Miss Paulette Micklewood of Oxford, in memory of her father.

== Station honours ==
The following are awards made at Hoylake:

- RNIPLS Silver Medal
  George Davies, Coxswain – 1851
- RNLI Silver Medal
  Thomas Dodd, Coxswain – 1902
- Silver Medal awarded by the Government of the Netherlands
  George Davies, Coxswain – 1864
- RNLI Bronze Medal
  Herbert Jones, Coxswain – 1943
  Benjamin Stanton Armitage, boatman – 1943
  William G. Widdup, late Coxswain, H.M. Coastguard – 1943
  Harold Triggs, Coxswain – 1971
  Thomas Henry Jones, Coxswain – 1980
- Medal Service Certificate
  Peter Jones, Acting Motor Mechanic – 1980
  Alan Tolley, Acting Assistant Mechanic – 1980
  Geoffrey Ormrod, crew member – 1980
  Gordon Bird, crew member – 1980
- First Class Certificate of Merit
  awarded by The Imperial Russian Association for Life-saving on Waters
  Each of the Hoylake Lifeboat Crew – 1902
- The Thanks of the Institution inscribed on Vellum
  Capt. Joshua Armitage – 1896
  John McDermott, Second Coxswain – 1980
  David Dodd, crew member – 1980
- A Framed Letter of Thanks signed by the Chairman of the Institution
  Jeffery Kernigan, Acting Tractor Driver – 1980
  Jesse Bird, Acting Assistant Tractor Driver – 1980
- Member, Order of the British Empire (MBE)
  David Arthur Dodd, Coxswain – 1998QBH
- British Empire Medal
  David Anthony Whiteley, Coxswain – 2016NYH

== Roll of honour ==
In memory of those lost whilst serving at Hoylake:

- Lost when the Greathead-class lifeboat capsized, on service to the ship Traveller, 29 December 1810.

Henry Bird (40)
Henry Bird (18)
John Bird (43)
John Bird (16)

Joseph Hughes (38)
Richard Hughes (36)
Thomas Hughes (16)
Nicholas Seed (27)

- Died following a blow to the head with the winch handle, whilst recovering the lifeboat Admiral Briggs (ON 383), following service to the fishing boat Sarah Ann, 6 September 1899.
  Edward Lilley, shore crew (30)
- Drowned after being washed overboard from the Hannah Fawsett Bennett (ON 555), whilst on service to the sloop Swift of Runcorn, 15 November 1906
  John Isaac Roberts, crew member (23)

== Hoylake and Hilbre lifeboats ==
=== Liverpool Dock Trustee lifeboats ===
==== Hoylake ====
Name	Built	On station	Class	Comments
Unnamed	1802	1803−c.1818	Greathead	(Note: Lifeboat of unknown dimensions, funded by the Liverpool Dock Commissioners, built by Henry Greathead.); Capsized 29 October 1810.
Unnamed	1826	1826−1840	30-foot Liverpool non-self-righting	(Note: 30 ft 0 in (9.14 m) x 9 ft 3 in (2.82 m) (12-oared) Liverpool-class non-self-righting lifeboat, funded by Harbour Dues.); With no specific records, it has been assumed that this boat was identical to the boat supplied to Point of Air at the same time. Sold in 1841.
Unnamed	1840	1840−1862	30-foot Liverpool non-self-righting	(Note: 30 ft 0 in (9.14 m) x 9 ft 3 in (2.82 m) (12-oared) Liverpool-class non-self-righting lifeboat, funded by Harbour Dues, built by Thomas Costain of Liverpool, costing £180.)
Unnamed	1862	1862−1892	34-foot Whale-boat	(Note: 34 ft 0 in (10.36 m) (12-oared) non-self-righting Whale-boat lifeboat, built by Lamb and White, of Cowes.)
Unnamed	1892	1892−1894	34-foot Liverpool (P&S)	(Note: 34 ft 3 in (10.44 m) x 9 ft 9 in (2.97 m) (12-oared) non-self-righting lifeboat, built by Charles Howson & Co. of Liverpool, costing £280.); Transferred to RNLI in 1894, modified, returned to station named Coard William Squarey (ON 377).

==== Hoylake No.2 ====
Name	Built	On station	Class	Comments
Unnamed	1839	1840−1848	30-foot Liverpool non-self-righting	(Note: 30 ft 0 in (9.14 m) x 9 ft 3 in (2.82 m) (12-oared) Liverpool-class non-self-righting lifeboat, funded by Harbour Dues, built by Thomas Costain, costing £180.); Moved to Hilbre Island in 1848.

==== Hilbre Island ====
Name	Built	On station	Class	Comments
Unnamed	1839	1848−1864	30-foot Liverpool non-self-righting	Previously at Hoylake No.2.
Unnamed	1864	1864−1890	33-foot 6in Liverpool non-self-righting	(Note: 33 ft 6 in (10.21 m) x 9 ft 6 in (2.90 m) (12-oared) Liverpool-class non-self-righting lifeboat, funded by Harbour Dues, built by Thomas Costain of Liverpool.); On loan to Point of Air, 8 Aug 1890 − 20 November 1891.
Unnamed	1864	1891−1895	33-foot 6in Liverpool non-self-righting	Sold in 1896

=== RNLI lifeboats ===
==== Hoylake (P&S) lifeboats ====
ON (Note: ON is the RNLI's Official Number of the boat.)	Name	Built	On station	Class	Comments
377	Coard William Squarey	1892	1894−1906	34-foot Liverpool (P&S)	Condemned and sold in 1906.
555	Hannah Fawsett Bennett	1906	1906−1931	38-foot Liverpool (P&S)	(Note: 38 ft 0 in (11.58 m) x 10 ft 0 in (3.05 m) (12-oared) Liverpool-class non-self-righting (P&S) lifeboat, legacies of Mrs L. H. F. Bennett and Mr C. H. Lear, of West Kirby, built by Thames Ironworks of Blackwall, London, costing £1,160.); Sold in 1936. Last reported at South Benfleet in 1937.

==== Hilbre Island (P&S) lifeboats ====
ON	Name	Built	On station	Class	Comments
383	Admiral Briggs	1895	1895−1914	35-foot Liverpool (P&S)	(Note: 35 ft 0 in (10.67 m) x 10 ft 0 in (3.05 m) (12-oared) Liverpool-class non-self-righting (P&S) lifeboat, the gift of Maj-Gen. W. L. Briggs CB, built by Rutherford & Co of Birkenhead, costing £453.); Condemned and sold in 1914.
413	James Stevens No.2	1898	1914−1924	35-foot Liverpool (P&S)	(Note: 35 ft 0 in (10.67 m) x 10 ft 0 in (3.05 m) (12-oared) Liverpool-class non-self-righting (P&S) lifeboat, legacy of Mr J. Stevens of Birmingham, built by Reynolds of Lowestoft, costing £538.); Previously at Campbeltown. Sold in 1924.
461	Chapman	1901	1924−1938	35-foot Liverpool (P&S)	(Note: 35 ft 0 in (10.67 m) x 10 ft 0 in (3.05 m) (12-oared) Liverpool-class non-self-righting (P&S) lifeboat, legacy of Mrs M. A. Chapman of West Brompton, built by Thames Ironworks of Blackwall, London, costing £922.); Previously at Groomsport. Sold in 1939. Renamed Harbinger, later Peggy LR41. Restored as Chapman, on display at the Old Lifeboat House, Lytham, December 2024.

Station Closed, 1938

==== Hoylake motor lifeboats ====
ON	Op.No. (Note: Op.No. is the RNLI's Operational Number carried on the hull or vehicle.)	Name	Built	On station	Class	Comments
750	−	Oldham	1931	1931−1952	Liverpool	
894	−	Oldham IV	1952	1952−1970	Liverpool	
862	−	Thomas Corbett	1948	1970−1974	Liverpool	Transferred to Clogherhead.
1000	37-29	Mary Gabriel	1973	1974−1990	Rother	Transferred to Rhyl.
1163	12-005	Lady of Hilbre	1990	1990−2014	Mersey	
1313	13-06	Edmund Hawthorne Micklewood	2014	2014−	Shannon	

More post-service details can be found on the respective lifeboat class pages.

==== Hovercraft ====
Op.No.	Name	Built	On station	Class	Comments
H-005	Hurley Spirit	2005	2016−	H-class (Griffon Hoverwork 470TD)	Previously at New Brighton.

=== Launch and recovery tractors ===
Op.No.	Reg. No.	Type	On station	Comments
T1	TC 648	Clayton	1921	
T2	AH 5933	Clayton	1921	
T3	MA 6793	Clayton	1921–1928	
T23	PP 7515	FWD Co.	1928–1929	Named Princess Victoria
T24	UW 2641	FWD Co.	1929–1949	
T45	KGJ 58	Case LA	1949–1953	
T56	MYR 426	Fowler Challenger III	1953–1960	
T67	YLD 792	Fowler Challenger III	1960–1969	
T61	PLA 561	Fowler Challenger III	1969–1975	
T63	PFX 163	Fowler Challenger III	1975–1978	
T68	YUV 742	Fowler Challenger III	1978–1982	
T56	MYR 426	Fowler Challenger III	1982–1983	
T91	UAW 558Y	Talus MB-H Crawler	1983–1986	
T94	B567 FAW	Talus MB-H Crawler	1986–1997	
T92	A462 AUX	Talus MB-H Crawler	1997–2007	
T99	C82 NUX	Talus MB-H Crawler	2007–2014	
SC-T06	HF14 HLK	SLARS (Supacat)	2014–	Named Roland Hough

== See also ==
- List of RNLI stations
- List of former RNLI stations
- Royal National Lifeboat Institution lifeboats
