= Gronant =

Village in Flintshire, Wales

Coordinates: 53.339°N 3.365°W

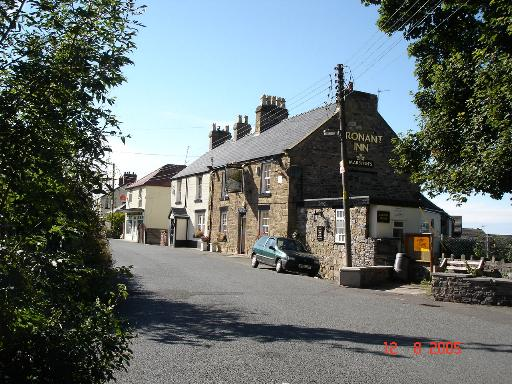
- The Gronant Inn public house

- Location within Flintshire
- Population: 1,527 (2011)
- OS grid reference: SJ091833
- Principal area: Flintshire
- Preserved county: Clwyd
- Country: Wales
- Sovereign state: United Kingdom
- Post town: PRESTATYN
- Postcode district: LL19
- Dialling code: 01745
- Police: North Wales
- Fire: North Wales
- Ambulance: Welsh
- UK Parliament: Clwyd East
- Senedd Cymru – Welsh Parliament: Delyn

Gronant is a village in Flintshire, Wales, about 2 miles east of Prestatyn. The population, as measured by the 2001 census, is 1,595, living in 697 households. The average age of the populace is 41.4 years, slightly higher than the national average. Following reorganisation all the population is now listed under the community of Llanasa; the electoral ward remains, its population at the 2011 census being 1,527.

Gronant's most famous resident was probably Elis Gruffydd (c. 1490-c. 1552), a noted Welsh chronicler of the early modern period. A soldier who served in the English garrison at Calais, Gruffudd's chronicle is held at the National Library of Wales.

Gronant dunes are part of an extensive network of dunes extending from Prestatyn in Denbighshire to the Point of Ayr in Flintshire which is at the entrance to the Dee Estuary. They are designated as a local nature reserve and the dune system as a whole is recognized as a Site of Special Scientific Interest.
