= List of shipwrecks in January 1877 =

The list of shipwrecks in January 1877 includes ships sunk, foundered, grounded, or otherwise lost during January 1877.

== 1 January ==
List of shipwrecks: 1 January 1877
Ship	State	Description
Agnes Wyllie	United Kingdom	The steamship was wrecked on the Goodwin Sands, Kent with the loss of ten of her eleven crew. The survivor was rescued by the pilot schooner No. 4 (United Kingdom). Agnes Wyllie was on a voyage from Middlesbrough, Yorkshire to Caen, Calvados, France.
Alexander	Russia	The ship foundered off the coast of Caithness, United Kingdom.
Angela	Spain	The barque was driven ashore at the Rammekens Castle, Vlissingen, Zeeland, Netherlands She was on a voyage from Antwerp, Belgium to Havana, Cuba.
Anna	Netherlands	The schooner sprang a leak and foundered off Ouessant, Finistère, France. Her six crew were rescued by Bonnie Marie (France). Anna was on a voyage from Fowey, Cornwall, United Kingdom to Cette, Hérault, France.
Celina	France	The schooner was driven ashore at "Pwitgwaerock", Pembrokeshire, United Kingdom. She was on a voyage from Troon, Ayrshire, United Kingdom to Pontorson, Manche.
City of Ghent	United Kingdom	The steamship was driven ashore at Ramsgate, Kent. She was refloated and towed into Ramsgate.
Disco	United Kingdom	The brig was driven ashore and wrecked at Charlestown, Cornwall. She was on a voyage from Charlestown to Havre de Grâce, Seine-Inférieure, France.
Emilie	United States	The steamship sank off Key West, Florida with the loss of two lives. One boat with survivors was reported missing.
Florence	United Kingdom	The brigantine was abandoned off Puffin Island, Anglesey Her crew were rescued by the Penmon Lifeboat. She was subsequently reboarded by her crew and towed into the River Mersey by the tug Warrior (United Kingdom).
Independenzia	Italy	The barque was driven ashore at the Rammekens Castle. She was on a voyage from Antwerp, Belgium to Valparaíso, Chile.
Invererne	United Kingdom	The clipper ship was wrecked on the west coast of Sumbawa, Netherlands East Indies with the loss of ten of her nineteen crew. She was on a voyage from Java, Netherlands East Indies to Falmouth, Cornwall.
Kate and Ann	United Kingdom	The schooner was run ashore at Bootle, Lancashire. She was on a voyage from Liverpool, Lancashire to Messina, Sicily, Italy.
Melaka	Spain	The barque was driven ashore at the Rammekens Castle. She was on a voyage from Antwerp to Havana
Petit Arthur	France	The ship was driven ashore at Carnac, Morbihan. She was refloated in September and taken into Lorient for repairs.
Princesse Louise	United Kingdom	The ship was scuttled in Bangor Bay. She was on a voyage from Glasgow, Renfrewshire to Cork.
Result	(United Kingdom of Great Britain and Ireland) Guernsey	The barque was driven ashore and wrecked at Spittal, Northumberland. Her ten crew were rescued by the Berwick upon Tweed Lifeboat Albert Victor ( Royal National Lifeboat Institution).
Unione	Italy	The barque was driven ashore at Gibraltar. She was on a voyage from Punta de Lobos, Chile to Gibraltar.
Wancoina	United Kingdom	The brigantine collided with Emily Burnyear (United Kingdom) and was driven ashore on Holy Island, in the Firth of Clyde. Wancoina was refloated with the assistance of a tug.

== 2 January ==
List of shipwrecks: 2 January 1877
Ship	State	Description
Amaoassis	France	The lugger was wrecked at Larache, Morocco.
Cellina	United Kingdom	The ship was driven ashore at "Pwllgwayloo", Pembrokeshire.
Clemence	France	The ship was driven ashore and severely damaged at Boulogne, Pas-de-Calais. Her crew were rescued. She was on a voyage from Le Tréport, Seine-Inférieure to Cherbourg, Manche. She was refloated and taken into Boulogne.
Cordillera	Spain	The brigantine was run into by the steamship Longhirst (United Kingdom) in the Guadalquivir and was severely damaged. She was beached with the assistance of the steamship Jovanilleros (Spain).
Feliz	Spain	The barque was driven ashore and wrecked in Bantry Bay. Her fourteen crew were rescued. She was on a voyage from Galveston, Texas, United States to Liverpool, Lancashire, United Kingdom.
Grace Robertson	United Kingdom	The brig ran aground at Larache and was wrecked. Her crew were rescued. She was on a voyage from Larache to Queenstown, County Cork.
Gummershaw	United Kingdom	The schooner was driven ashore at Cushendall, County Antrim.
H. A. Brightman	United Kingdom	The steamship was driven ashore at Lydd, Kent. She was refloated on 31 January.
Laurina	United Kingdom	The ship was driven ashore and wrecked at East Quantoxhead, Somerset. She was on a voyage from Newport, Monmouthshire to Watchet, Somerset.
Massachusetts	United States	The schooner stranded off Cape Cod, Massachusetts 1 nautical mile (1.9 km) west of the Peaked Hill Life Saving Station in a thick snowstorm. Three of her crew made it to shore, one drowned when swept overboard by a wave.
May Queen	United States	The schooner was wrecked on Coney Island, New York. The crew were saved.
Roma	Italy	The barque was wrecked on the Kaloot Bank, off the coast of Zeeland, Netherlands.
Verulam	United Kingdom	The barque sank at the entrance to the Surrey Commercial Docks, London with the loss of three of her crew. She was on a voyage from Port Natal, Natal Colony to London.
Walter Irving	United States	The schooner stranded on a bar off Cape Cod 2 nautical miles (3.7 km) east of the Peaked Hill Life Saving Station in a thick snowstorm. Her crew made it to shore in their boat.
Unnamed	United Kingdom	The ship was wrecked near Santander, Spain.
Unnamed	(United Kingdom of Great Britain and Ireland) Isle of Man	The fishing trawler was driven ashore in Ramsey Bay. Her crew were rescued.

== 3 January ==
List of shipwrecks: 3 January 1877
Ship	State	Description
HMS Akbar	Royal Navy	The training ship was driven ashore at Rock Ferry, Cheshire. She was refloated the next day and taken into Birkenhead, Cheshire.
Alexandria	United Kingdom	The steamship was driven ashore at Clogherhead, County Louth. She was on a voyage from Liverpool, Lancashire to the Clyde. She was declared a total loss. Subsequently refloated and taken in tow for Belfast, County Antrim but sank off the Copeland Island, County Antrim on 30 January with the loss of seven of the seventeen people on board. Survivors were rescued by the tug Kingfisher and the steamship Seamer (both United Kingdom).
Ann Brass	United Kingdom	The schooner was driven ashore at Cairnbulg, Aberdeenshire. Her crew were rescued by a fishing boat.
Champion of the Seas	United Kingdom	The clipper ship was abandoned in a leaking condition 90 nautical miles (170 km) south west of Faial Island, Azores. Her 34 crew were rescued by Vanguard (United Kingdom). Champion of the Seas was on a voyage from the Chincha Islands, Peru to Cork.
Corais	Greece	The barque ran aground off Punta Mala, Spain. She was refloated and taken into Gibraltar.
Dandy Esther	United Kingdom	The schooner was abandoned off Holyhead, Anglesey. Her crew were rescued by the Holyhead Lifeboat Thomas Fielden ( Royal National Lifeboat Institution). Dandy Esther was subsequently taken into Holyhead.
Eliza	United Kingdom	The schooner was wrecked on the Oxcar Rocks, in the Firth of Forth. Her crew sruvvied She was on a voyage from Granton, Lothian to Montrose, Forfarshire.
Enigheid, and Fides	Denmark	The schooners collided off Aalborg and both sank. One life was lost. Survivors were rescued by the schooner Otto (Denmark). Enigheid was on a voyage from Hull, Yorkshire, United Kingdom to Fredericia. Fides was on a voyage from Charlestown, Cornwall, United Kingdom to Aarhus.
Ezuiaga	Spain	The barque was wrecked at Puerto Rico. Her crew were rescued.
Glasgow, and Mary Alice	United Kingdom	The steamship Glasgow and the schooner Mary Alice collided at Campbeltown, Argyllshire. Both vessels were severely damaged and beached. Mary Alice was on a voyage from Paisley, Renfrewshire to Belfast, County Antrim.
Heron	United Kingdom	The steamship was driven ashore at the Cliffe Fort, Kent. She was on a voyage from Antwerp, Belgium to London. She was refloated and completed her voyage.
Holyhead Trader	United Kingdom	The schooner sank at Holyhead.
Hopewell	United Kingdom	The schooner collided with the steamship Sam Weller (United Kingdom) and foundered in the Boston Deeps, off the coast of Lincolnshire. Her crew were rescued by Sam Weller. Hopewell was on a voyage from Goole, Yorkshire to London.
Idas	United Kingdom	The brig was driven ashore and wrecked on the Langness Peninsula, Isle of Man with the loss of all ten people on board.
John and Eliza	United Kingdom	The smack was abandoned off Holyhead, Anglesey. Her crew were rescued by the Holyhead Lifeboat Thomas Fielden ( Royal National Lifeboat Institution).
Lady Derby	United Kingdom	The steamship was abandoned in the North Sea 35 nautical miles (65 km) off Tynemouth, Northumberland. Her fourteen crew were rescued by the steamship Edina (United Kingdom). Lady Derby was on a voyage from Grantonl, Lothian to West Hartlepool, County Durham.
Louisa Spalding	United Kingdom	The ship foundered off the coast of Aberdeenshire.
Margaret Elizabeth	United Kingdom	The ship was driven ashore south of Benhead, County Louth. Her crew were rescued. She was on a voyage from Silloth, Cumberland to Dundalk, County Louth.
Mary Jane	United Kingdom	The ship was driven ashore at Campbeltown, Argyllshire. She was on a voyage from the Clyde to Pensacola, Florida, United States.
Maud Annie	United Kingdom	The ship was driven ashore at Rosslare, County Wexford. Her crew were rescued. She was on a voyage from Newport, Monmouthshire to Wexford.
Ruby	United Kingdom	The smack was driven ashore at Tetney Haven, Lincolnshire.
Sinai	Austria-Hungary	The brig was driven ashore and wrecked in at Belmullet, County Mayo, United Kingdom. She was on a voyage from Troon, Ayrshire, United Kingdom to Demerara, British Guiana.
Sir Walter Scott	Canada	The schooner was driven ashore and wrecked at the mouth of the River Boyne. Her crew were rescued. She was on a voyage from Maryport, Cumberland to Dublin, United Kingdom.
Waterloo	United Kingdom	The paddle steamer collided with the steamship Stettin (United Kingdom), ran aground and sank on the Upper Blyth Sand, in the Thames Estuary. All on board were rescued by a tug. Waterloo was on a voyage from London to Boulogne, Pas-de-Calais, France. She was refloated on 20 January and towed into London.
Unnamed	United Kingdom	The collier was driven ashore at Dunany Point, County Louth.
Unnamed	United Kingdom	The fishing smack was wrecked near Skerries, County Dublin.
Unnamed	Flag unknown	The ship was driven ashore near Skerries, County Dublin.
Unnamed	Flag unknown	The schooner ran aground on the Maplin Sand, in the North Sea off the coast of Essex, United Kingdom.
Unnamed	United Kingdom	The steamship foundered off Whitby, Yorkshire with the loss of all hands.

== 4 January ==
List of shipwrecks: 4 January 1877
Ship	State	Description
Alexandra	United Kingdom	The steamship was driven ashore in Clogher Bay. She was on a voyage from Cádiz, Spain to the Clyde. She was refloated in late January but foundered off the Copeland Islands, County Antrim with loss of life.
Andrea Antonio	Italy	The barque was driven from her moorings and collided with the hulk Bucephalus ( (United Kingdom of Great Britain and Ireland) Gibraltar) at Gibraltar and was severely damaged.
Ann Summer	United Kingdom	The schooner ran aground at Holyhead, Anglesey.
Arctic	United Kingdom	The ship was driven ashore at Killard Point, County Down. Her crew were rescued. She was on a voyage from Birkenhead, Cheshire to Portaferry, County Down.
Elise	Norway	The barque was wrecked on "Roth Island", Denmark. Her crew were rescued. She was on a voyage from a French port to Christiania.
Excellent	United Kingdom	The ship sank at Donaghadee, County Down. She was on a voyage from Ardrossan, Ayrshire to a French port.
Feressins	Sweden	The ship was driven ashore at Ballywalter, County Down. She was on a voyage from Greenock, Renfrewshire, United Kingdom to Lisbon, Portugal.
Fortune	United Kingdom	The schooner sank off Carrickfergus, County Antrim. Her four crew were rescued by the Coastguard. She was on a voyage from Maryport, Cumberland to Carrickfergus.
Herald	United Kingdom	The ship was driven ashore at Greencastle, County Down.
Ida	United Kingdom	The barque was driven ashore and wrecked at Brighton, Sussex. Her crew were rescued by the Coastguard using rocket apparatus. A Coastguard officer was killed by the explosion of one of the rockets. Ida was on a voyage from Havre de Grâce, Seine-Inférieure, France to Pensacola, Florida, United States. The ship was plundered by the local inhabitants the next day.
Martel	United Kingdom	The ship ran aground in the Gironde between 3.8 and 4.9 nautical miles (7 and 9 km) from its mouth and broke in three. She was on a voyage from Swansea, Glamorgan to Bordeaux, Gironde, France.
Mary and Catherine	United Kingdom	The brig was driven ashore at Gibraltar. She was on a voyage from Taganrog, Russia to Falmouth, Cornwall.
Mary R. Somers	United Kingdom	The schooner was abandoned in the Atlantic Ocean. Her crew were rescued by a steamship. She was on a voyage from Liverpool, Lancashire to Cárdenas, Cuba.
Naomi	United Kingdom	The barque ran aground on the Winterton Ridge, in the North Sea off the coast of Norfolk and was wrecked. Eight of her eleven crew were rescued by the steamship Admiral (United Kingdom), the others were rescued by another vessel.
Nonas	Malta	The barque was driven ashore at Gibraltar. She was on a voyage from Sicily, Italy to Hull, Yorkshire. She was refloated the next day with assistance from the tug Lion Belge ( (United Kingdom of Great Britain and Ireland) Gibraltar)
Pedsford	United Kingdom	The schooner was wrecked on the Lother Ledge, off Balbriggan, County Dublin. Her crew were rescued.
Princess Victoria	United Kingdom	The brig was driven ashore at Northfleet, Kent. She was on a voyage from West Hartlepool, County Durham to London.
Sagittaire	France	The barque was driven ashore at Punta Mala, Spain. She was on a voyage from Marseille, Bouches-du-Rhône to the French Antilles.
Satsuma	United Kingdom	The barque was driven into by the barque Union (Italy) and drove ashore at Gibraltar. Satsuma was on a voyage from Singapore, Straits Settlements to Marseille. She was refloated with assistance from the tug Hercules ( (United Kingdom of Great Britain and Ireland) Gibraltar)and found to be severely damaged.
St. George	United Kingdom	The ship was driven ashore at Greencastle.
Victorine Apollo	France	The brig was beached at Havre de Grâce, Seine-Inférieure with the loss of three of her crew.
Welsford	United Kingdom	The brigantine was wrecked at Balbriggan. Her crew were rescued. She was on a voyage from Maryport to Dublin.
Unnamed	Flag unknown	The barque was driven ashore at Gibraltar.
Unnamed	United Kingdom	The lugger was driven ashore at Donaghadee, County Down. Her five crew were rescued.
Unnamed	United Kingdom	The ship was driven ashore at Ballyferris, County Down.
Eight unnamed vessels	Flags unknown	A coaster sank at Greencastle. Seven other vessels were driven ashore.
Unnamed	France	The ship was driven ashore and wrecked at Auray, Morbihan.

== 5 January ==
List of shipwrecks: 5 January 1877
Ship	State	Description
Eupatoria	United Kingdom	The ship was driven ashore in the River Thames at Tilbury, Essex. She was on a voyage from Northfleet, Kent to South Shields, County Durham.
Fanny	United Kingdom	The smack was driven ashore at Stackpole Head, Pembrokeshire. Her captain was taken off by the Stackpole Lifeboat but her mate refused to leave the ship. She sank the next day, drowning him. She was on a voyage from Bristol, Gloucestershire to Briton Ferry, Glamorgan.
Gentoo	United States	The barque was driven ashore at Batavia, Netherlands East Indies. She was on a voyage from Batavia to Java.
George Cromwell	United States	The steamship was wrecked in Placentia Bay on the coast of the Newfoundland Colony. Her entire crew of 30 perished.
Golden Age	United Kingdom	The barque was driven ashore on Vlieland, Friesland, Netherlands and caught fire. Her crew survived. She was on a voyage from Rangoon, Burma to Bremen, Germany.
Jean Bart	France	The schooner was run into by the tug Progress (France and sank at Dunkirk, Nord.
Netherton	United Kingdom	The brig was driven ashore in the Carlingford Lough.
Prosperity	United Kingdom	The ship was driven ashore in the Carlingford Lough.
Saxonia	Germany	The steamship was driven ashore on Heligoland. All on board were rescued. She was on a voyage from Hamburg to the West Indies.
Sophie	Denmark	The schooner capsized off Hanstholm with the loss of two of her crew. Survivors were rescued by the barque America (Norway). Sophie was on a voyage from Newcastle upon Tyne, Northumberland, United Kingdom to Odense.
Wyre	United Kingdom	The schooner was driven ashore in the Carlingford Lough.

== 6 January ==
List of shipwrecks: 6 January 1877
Ship	State	Description
Ada	United Kingdom	The barque was severely damaged by fire at Liverpool, Lancashire.
Antilles	United Kingdom	The ship was lost near Valparaíso, Chile. Her crew were rescued. She was on a voyage from the Clyde to Valparaíso.
Assecurandeur	United Kingdom	The barque was abandoned in the Atlantic Ocean. Her crew were rescued by the full-rigged ship Alexander Marshall (United States), which lost four of her crew effecting the rescue. Assecurandeur was on a voyage from Saint John's, Newfoundland Colony to Queenstown, County Cork. Assecurandeur was subsequently discovered by Titania (United Kingdom) and was set afire.
August	United Kingdom	The brig was driven ashore near Kalundborg, Sweden. She was on a voyage from Newcastle upon Tyne, Northumberland to Wolgast, Germany.
Queen of the Fal	United Kingdom	The brigantine was driven ashore at Shoeburyness, Essex. She was refloated with the assistance of a tug and taken into Gravesend, Kent.
Simala, or Simola	United States	The 1,000-ton full-rigged ship sank in the North Atlantic Ocean off Harvey Cedars, New Jersey, during a storm. Her crew of twenty survived.
Spitzbergen	Germany	The steamship departed from Kristiansund, Norway for Dundee, Forfarshire, United Kingdom. Subsequently foundered with the loss of all sixteen crew; a case containing the ship's papers came ashore at Bergen in late February.
Unnamed	United Kingdom	The smack was wrecked near Millport, Ayrshire. Her crew were rescued.

== 7 January ==
List of shipwrecks: 7 January 1877
Ship	State	Description
Dakotan	United States	The full-rigged ship was struck by lightning in the Atlantic Ocean and caught fire. She was abandoned the next day. All on board were rescued. She was on a voyage from New Orleans, Louisiana to Liverpool, Lancashire, United Kingdom.
James Mason	United Kingdom	The ship departed from Cardiff, Glamorgan for Gibraltar. No further trace, presumed foundered with the loss of all twenty crew.
John o'Gaunt	United Kingdom	The ship was wrecked on Samar, Spanish East Indies. She was on a voyage from Liverpool to Anjer, Netherlands East Indies and Manilla, Spanish East Indies.
L'Amerique	France	Illustration of L'Amerique aground, from Harper's Weekly, 27 January 1877. During a voyage from Le Havre, France, to New York City, the 4,583-gross register ton screw steamer was stranded on the beach at Seabright, New Jersey between Life Saving Station No. 3 and No. 4 in rain and heavy seas. Three of her crew drowned when one of her lifeboats capsized. Everyone else on board — 54 passengers and 46 crew members — plus 550 pounds (249 kg) of gold were saved. She was refloated on 10 April and returned to service.
Montgomery	United States	The steamship collided with the steamship Seminole (United States) and sank off Cape May, New Jersey with the loss of thirteen lives. Survivors were rescued by Seminole. Montgomery was on a voyage from New York to Havana, Cuba.
Sheltan	United Kingdom	The ship departed from Saint John's, Newfoundland Colony for Liverpool. No further trace, reported missing.

== 8 January ==
List of shipwrecks: 8 January 1877
Ship	State	Description
Five Sisters	United Kingdom	The brig departed from Agrigento, Sicily, Italy for Porto, Portugal. No further trace, presumed foundered with the loss of all hands.
Princess	United Kingdom	The ship departed from Paraíba, Brazil for the English Channel. No further trace, reported missing.
Sisters	United Kingdom	The sloop was driven ashore at Leven, Fife. She was on a voyage from Lindisfarne, Northumberland to Methil, Fife. She was refloated the next day.
Victoria	Germany	The barque was driven ashore and wrecked at Utsira, Norway. Her crew were rescued. She was on a voyage from Grangemouth, Stirlingshire, United Kingdom to Helsingør, Denmark.

== 9 January ==
List of shipwrecks: 9 January 1877
Ship	State	Description
Estonia	Russia	The barque ran aground and sank near Lillesand, Norway. She was on a voyage from West Hartlepool, County Durham, United Kingdom to Reval.
Harriett Forteath	Royal National Lifeboat Institution	The lifeboat capsized off Whitby, Yorkshire with the loss of three of her crew. She was going to the assistance of Agenoria (United Kingdom). Harriet Forteath subsequently drove ashore.
Sisters	United Kingdom	The brig was damaged by fire at Dundee, Forfarshire.
Z. Ring	United Kingdom	The ship arrived at Bombay, India from North Shields, Northumberland on fire.

== 10 January ==
List of shipwrecks: 10 January 1877
Ship	State	Description
Abeona	United Kingdom	The ship sank at Scarborough, Yorkshire. She was on a voyage from Hartlepool, County Durham to Great Yarmouth, Norfolk.
Agenoria	United Kingdom	The ketch was driven ashore at Whitby, Yorkshire. Her three crew were rescued by rocket apparatus. She was on a voyage from Hartlepool, County Durham to Whitby.
Belle	United Kingdom	The smack foundered in the North Sea off the coast of Norfolk. Her crew were rescued.
Concordia	Germany	The brig was wrecked at Bayona, Spain. Her crew were rescued. She was on a voyage from Newport, Monmouthshire, United Kingdom to Jamaica.
Juno	United Kingdom	The steamship ran aground at "Horsehead", County Cork. She was on a voyage from Bristol, Gloucestershire, to Queenstown, County Cork.
Margaret	United Kingdom	The schooner was run down and sunk by the steamship Breda (Netherlands) at Sheerness, Kent with the loss of a crew member.
Meta	United Kingdom	The steamship ran aground at Dingle Point, Lancashire. She was on a voyage from Liverpool, Lancashire to A Coruña, Spain. She was refloated and found to be leaky.
Powerful	United Kingdom	The tug ran aground on the Maplin Sand, in the North Sea off the coast of Essex.

== 11 January ==
List of shipwrecks: 11 January 1877
Ship	State	Description
Abeona	United Kingdom	The ship sprang a leak and put into Scarborough, Yorkshire, where she sank. She was on a voyage from Hartlepool, County Durham to Great Yarmouth, Norfolk.
Caroline	France	The schooner ran aground on the Shipwash Sand, in the North Sea off the coast of Suffolk, United Kingdom and became severely leaky. She was abandoned by her crew, who were rescued by the smack Volunteer (United Kingdom). Caroline was on a voyage from the River Tyne to Marseille, Bouches-du-Rhône, France.
Congo	Norway	The barque ran aground and sank off Lydd, Kent, United Kingdom with the loss of eight of her nine crew. She was on a voyage from Newcastle upon Tyne, Northumberland, United Kingdom to Lisbon, Portugal.
Favourite	United Kingdom	The Thames barge was driven ashore at Deal, Kent. She was on a voyage from Milton Regis to Walmer, Kent.
Glance	New Zealand	The 19-ton cutter was wrecked on Shoe Island, off the coast of the Coromandel Peninsula, New Zealand.
Jessie	United Kingdom	The brigantine was driven ashore and wrecked at Port Mooar, Isle of Man. Her crew were rescued. She was on a voyage from Fleetwood, Lancashire to Belfast, County Antrim.
Les Deux Sœurs	France	The fishing Ketch was driven ashore at Rye Harbour, Sussex, United Kingdom. Her crew were rescued.
Sisters	United Kingdom	The barque was driven ashore at Laytown, County Meath. Her eleven crew were rescued by the Drogheda No.2 lifeboat John Rutter Chorley ( Royal National Lifeboat Institution). Sisters was on a voyage from Baltimore, Maryland to Drogheda, County Louth.
True Briton	United Kingdom	The ship struck the quayside and sank at Dunkirk, Nord, France. She was on a voyage from London to Dunkirk.
Volharding	Netherlands	The brigantine struck a sunken wreck andfoundered in the North Sea. Her crew got aboard the Galloper Lightship ( Trinity House ), from where they were rescued by the fishing smack Le Bon de Dieu (France). Volharding was on a voyage from South Shields, County Durham to a Dutch port.

== 12 January ==
List of shipwrecks: 12 January 1877
Ship	State	Description
Flora	United Kingdom	The derelict ship was towed into Burghead, Moray.
Louise Desirée	France	The schooner was wrecked at the Pointe de la Coubre, Charente-Inférieure with the loss of all but her captain, at least five lives.
Providencia	United States	The ship was wrecked on the Kentish Knock. Her crew were rescued by the tug Napoleon (United Kingdom). Providecia was on a voyage from Amsterdam, North Holland, Netherlands to New York.
Royal Dane	United Kingdom	The steamship was driven ashore at Nivå, Denmark. She was on a voyage from Copenhagen, Denmark to Newcastle upon Tyne, Northumberland. She was refloated with assistance from a steamship and taken into Copenhagen for repairs.
Sjomanden	Norway	The barque was driven ashore at Spittal, Northumberland. She was on a voyage from Baltimore, Maryland, United States to Berwick upon Tweed, Northumberland. She was refloated with the assistance of three tugs and taken into Berwick upon Tweed.

== 13 January ==
List of shipwrecks: 13 January 1877
Ship	State	Description
Banshee	(United Kingdom of Great Britain and Ireland) Isle of Man	The smack was wrecked on the Grondale Rocks. Her crew were rescued.
Bonny Boys	United Kingdom	The fishing smack foundered in the North Sea north of Heligoland with the loss of all six hands.
Chanticleer	United Kingdom	The fishing smack foundered in the North Sea with the loss of all hands.
Contest	United Kingdom	The fishing smack foundered in the North Sea off Heligoland with the loss of all hands.
Dove	United Kingdom	The fishing smack foundered in the North Sea with the loss of all hands.
Edith	United Kingdom	The fishing smack foundered in the North Sea with the loss of all hands.
Garibaldi	United Kingdom	The fishing smack foundered in the North Sea with the loss of all hands.
Guide	United Kingdom	The fishing smack foundered in the North Sea with the loss of all hands.
Harmony	United Kingdom	The fishing smack foundered in the North Sea with the loss of all hands.
I'll Try	United Kingdom	The fishing smack foundered in the North Sea with the loss of all hands.
Lady Gertrude	United Kingdom	The paddle steamer was driven ashore at Toward Point, Argyllshire. She was on a voyage from Rothesay, Isle of Bute to Wemyss Bay.
Lioness	United Kingdom	The fishing smack foundered in the North Sea with the loss of all hands.
Litia Georgina	Netherlands	The schooner was run into by the barque Nouveau Moreli (France) and sank. Her crew were rescued. She was on a voyage from Rotterdam, South Holland to Saint-Brieuc, Côtes-du-Nord, France.
Maria	United Kingdom	The sloop was run into by the steamship Alderney (United Kingdom) and sank in the River Hamble. Her crew were rescued. Maria was on a voyage from Southampton, Hampshire to London.
Moselle	United Kingdom	The fishing smack foundered in the North Sea with the loss of all hands.
Norseman	United Kingdom	The full-rigged ship collided with the steamship Rosa (United Kingdom) and sank in the Atlantic Ocean. Her crew were rescued by Rosa. Norseman was on a voyage from the Pacific to Antwerp, Belgium.
Peep o'Day	United Kingdom	The fishing smack foundered in the North Sea with the loss of all hands.
Plutus	United Kingdom	The fishing smack foundered in the North Sea with the loss of all hands.
Pollies	United Kingdom	The fishing smack foundered in the North Sea with the loss of all four crew.
Prima Donna	United Kingdom	The fishing smack foundered in the North Sea with the loss of all hands.
Rachel	United Kingdom	The fishing smack foundered in the North Sea with the loss of all hands.
Rupicola	United Kingdom	The fishing smack foundered in the North Sea with the loss of all hands.
Sir Roger Tichborne	United Kingdom	The fishing smack foundered in the North Sea with the loss of all hands.
Twins	United Kingdom	The fishing smack foundered in the North Sea with the loss of all hands.
Two Sisters	United Kingdom	The fishing smack foundered in the North Sea with the loss of all hands.
Victor	United Kingdom	The fishing smack foundered in the North Sea with the loss of all five crew.
William Banks	United Kingdom	The steamship was driven ashore at Breaksea Point, Glamorgan. She was on a voyage from Havre de Grâce, Seine-Inférieure, France to Cardiff, Glamorgan.

== 14 January ==
List of shipwrecks: 14 January 1877
Ship	State	Description
Jones Brothers	United Kingdom	The steamship was abandoned off the Nash Lighthouse, Glamorgan. She was subsequently beached at Burnham-on-Sea, Somerset.
Oriole	United Kingdom	The ship was wrecked on Blockhow, at the entrance to the Carlingford Lough.
Skjoldmoen	Netherlands	The ship was driven ashore near Hythe, Kent, United Kingdom. She was on a voyage from Rotterdam, South Holland to Baltimore, Maryland, United States. She was refloated the next day and towed into Dover, Kent, United Kingdom.
Tookien	Netherlands	The steamship was wrecked near "Tord Joe". She was on a voyage from Singapore, Straits Settlements to Batavia, Netherlands East Indies.
Willie	United Kingdom	The schooner collided with the schooner Expert (United Kingdom) and sank in the English Channel off Dungeness, Kent. Her five crew survived. She was on a voyage from Ipswich, Suffolk to Milford Haven, Pembrokeshire.

== 15 January ==
List of shipwrecks: 15 January 1877
Ship	State	Description
Adler	Germany	The barque was driven ashore at Kearney Point, County Down, United Kingdom. Her fifteen crew were rescued the next day by the Coastguard. She was on a voyage from Shantou, China to Greenock, Renfrewshire, United Kingdom.
Alma, Jean Baptiste, Jessie Dunbar, and Ville du Temple	United Kingdom; France; United Kingdom; France	The ships collided at Saint-Nazaire, Loire-Inférieure. All four vessels were severely damaged.
Ancient Promise	United Kingdom	The brig ran aground on the Haisborough Sands, in the North Sea off the coast of Norfolk. She was on a voyage from Mazagan, Morocco to Hull, Yorkshire. She was refloated and assisted into Great Yarmouth, Norfolk in a leaky condition.
Bay	Denmark	The ship was abandoned at sea. Her thirteen crew were rescued by a Dutch fishing smack.
Bonny	United Kingdom	The steamship was driven ashore in the Canary Islands. She was refloated on 18 January and resumed her voyage.
Dilawar	United Kingdom	The ship arrived at Bombay, India on fire. She was on a voyage from Leith, Lothian to Bombay.
Emboriani Spanodi	Italy	The ship was driven ashore and wrecked on the coast of Zeeland, Netherlands. She was on a voyage from Taganrog, Russia to Rotterdam, South Holland, Netherlands.
Fookien	China	The steamship was wrecked on "Foedjoe" in the Bangka Strait. Her crew were rescued. She was on a voyage from Singapore, Straits Settlements to Batavia, Netherlands East Indies.
John Bright	United Kingdom	The schooner was run into by the paddle steamer Shamrock (United Kingdom) and capsized at Holyhead, Anglesey. Her crew were rescued by Shamrock. John Bright was on a voyage from Waterford to Liverpool, Lancashire. She was beached with assistance from the tug Knight Commander (United Kingdom).
Leo	(Russian Empire) Grand Duchy of Finland	The brig was driven ashore on Sully Island, Glamorgan, United Kingdom. She was on a voyage from Almería, Spain to Cardiff, Glamorgan. She was refloated and taken into Cardiff.
Lythemore	United Kingdom	The schooner ran aground in the Guadalquivir. She was on a voyage from Seville, Spain to Glasgow, Renfrewshire. She was refloated and taken into Sanlúcar de Barrameda for repairs.
Morehampton	United Kingdom	The steamship was driven ashore at Santander, Spain. She was on a voyage from Newcastle upon Tyne, Northumberland to Santander.
Muriel	United Kingdom	The steamship ran aground at Tampico, Mexico. She was on a voyage from New Orleans, Louisiana, United States to Liverpool. She was refloated.
Onward	United Kingdom	The ship was driven ashore on Banna Strand, County Kerry and was wrecked. Her crew were rescued. She was on a voyage from Swansea, Glamorgan to Tralee, County Kerry.
Otto	Norway	The ship was driven ashore west of Lyngør. Her crew were rescued.
Sliedrecht	Netherlands	The ship ran aground on the Zuider Haaks Bank, off the Dutch coast. She was on a voyage from Batavia, Netherlands East Indies to the Nieuwe Diep.

== 16 January ==
List of shipwrecks: 16 January 1877
Ship	State	Description
Caledonia	United Kingdom	The steamship was driven ashore at New York, United States. She was on a voyage from a Mediterranean port to New York. She was refloated and taken in o New York.
Constance	United States	The ship was driven ashore at Wilmington, Delaware.
Elisa Probolongo	United Kingdom	The ship was sighted in the Dardanelles whilst on a voyage from Sulina, Ottoman Empire to Falmouth, Cornwall. No further trace, reported missing.
Fhorer Helsing	Sweden	The ship was driven ashore near Blyth, Northumberland, United Kingdom.
Tirfling	Sweden	The brigantine ran aground on the Varne Sand. She was on a voyage from South Shields, County Durham, United Kingdom to Lisbon, Portugal. She was refloated and taken into Ramsgate, Kent, United Kingdom in a leaky condition.

== 17 January ==
List of shipwrecks: 17 January 1877
Ship	State	Description
Cologne	United Kingdom	The steamship ran aground on the Blyth Sand, in the Thames Estuary. She was on a voyage from London to Boulogne, Pas-de-Calais, France.
Glenlora	New Zealand	The ship was driven ashore at Wellington. She was refloated.
Ine Constantine	France	The ship was driven ashore at Dymchurch, Kent, United Kingdom. She was on a voyage from Dunkirk, Nord to Brest, Finistère.
J. B. Eminson	United Kingdom	The steamship collided with the steamship Benbow (United Kingdom) and sank in the River Thames near Gravesend, Kent. J. B. Eminson was on a voyage from Sunderland, County Durham to London.
Lucy Compton	United Kingdom	The barquentine was driven ashore and wrecked at Porto, Portugal with the loss of her captain.
Olgo	Italy	The ship collided with Raphael (Kingdom of Italy) and sank off Corsica, France. Olgo was on a voyage from Genoa to Heraklion, Crete.
Pete Mubrovacki	Austria-Hungary	The ship was lost off Saint Kilda, United Kingdom. Her nine crew reached the island. They were rescued on 17 February by HMS Jackal (Royal Navy). Pete Mubrovacki was on a voyage from Glasgow, Renfrewshire, United Kingdom to New York, United States.

== 18 January ==
List of shipwrecks: 18 January 1877
Ship	State	Description
European	United Kingdom	The steamship was driven ashore in the Scheldt. She was on a voyage from Antwerp, Belgium to Liverpool, Lancashire.
Globe	United Kingdom	The brig was damaged by fire at Lisbon, Portugal.
Nanta	Trieste	The barque was wrecked on the Rieske Sandbank, off Cahore, County Wexford, United Kingdom. Her thirteen crew were rescued by the RNLI Cahore Lifeboat Sir George Bowles. She was subsequently driven ashore at Cahore Point, County Wexford.
Racer	United Kingdom	The schooner was wrecked at Safi, Morocco. Her crew were rescued.
Shannon	United Kingdom	The smack was run into by the smack Memaid (United Kingdom) and sank off the South Knowl, in the North Sea off the coast of Norfolk. Her crew were rescued by Mermaid.
Urania	United Kingdom	The steamship ran aground on the North Bull, in the Irish Sea off Drogheda, County Louth with the loss of one of her eleven crew. She was on a voyage from Swansea, Glamorgan to Newry, County Antrim. Urania was refloated with assistance from the tug Kingfisher (United Kingdom) and towed into Drogheda.
Wreniw	United Kingdom	The steamship was driven ashore 2 nautical miles (3.7 km) north of the mouth of the River Boyne with the loss of one of her twelve crew. Survivors were rescued by the RNLI Drogheda No.1 lifeboat Old George Irlam of Liverpool.

== 19 January ==
List of shipwrecks: 19 January 1877
Ship	State	Description
Beata Sophia	Sweden	The brig was wrecked at Thyborøn, Denmark. Her crew were rescued. She was on a voyage from Hartlepool, County Durham, United Kingdom to Gothenburg.
Courser	United Kingdom	The ship was driven ashore at St Minver, Cornwall.
Hope	United Kingdom	The schooner foundered off Abercastle, Pembrokeshire. Her crew were rescued. She was on a voyage from Portmadoc, Caernarfonshire to Newport, Monmouthshire.
Joseph Love, and Mehemet Ali	United Kingdom (Ottoman Empire) Egyptian Navy	The steamship Joseph Love collided with the frigate Mehemet Ali at Constantinople, Ottoman Empire and sank with the loss of a crew member. Survivors were rescued by Mehemet Ali, which was severely damaged and was beached.
Kingdom of Italy	United Kingdom	The ship was driven ashore at Covelong, India. She subsequently became a wreck.
Landsborough	United States	The ship was driven ashore at New York. She was on a voyage from Larache, Morocco to New York. She was refloated and taken into New York.
Nauta	Austria-Hungary	The barque was driven ashore and wrecked at Cahore, County Wexford, United Kingdom. Her crew were rescued by the Cahore Lifeboat. She was on a voyage from Glasgow, Renfrewshire to Lussino.
Victoria	Germany	The barque was abandoned in the North Sea with some loss of life.
Unnamed	Norway	The ship sank near Ulvøysund with the loss of all hands.
Unnamed	United Kingdom	The fishing boat foundered off Evie, Orkney Islands with the loss of all four crew.

== 20 January ==
List of shipwrecks: 20 January 1877
Ship	State	Description
Albatross	United Kingdom	The ship collided with the Humber Lightship ( Trinity House) and sank with the loss of two of her five crew.
Bloomer	United Kingdom	The brigantine was driven ashore and wrecked at Maryport, Cumberland. She was on a voyage from Rostrevor, County Down to Maryport.
Brothers	United Kingdom	The barque was driven ashore at Philadelphia, Pennsylvania, United states. She was on a voyage from Philadelphia to Dublin.
Consett	United Kingdom	The steamship struck a sunken wreck between the Pearl Rock and Tarifa, Spain and was damaged. She was on a voyage from Smyrna, Ottoman Empire to Liverpool, Lancashire. She put into Gibraltar for repairs.
George Washington	United States	The steamship was wrecked on Cape Race, Newfoundland Colony with the loss of all 25 crew. She was on a voyage from Halifax, Nova Scotia, Canada to the Newfoundland Colony.
Hope	United Kingdom	The schooner foundered off Abercastle, Pembrokeshire. Her crew were rescued. She was on a voyage from Portmadoc, Caernarfonshire to Newport, Monmouthshire.
Johan Carl	Germany	The ship ran aground at Fredrikshavn, Denmark. She was on a voyage from Dysart, Fife, United Kingdom to Heilingenhafen.
John Watson	United Kingdom	The ship was driven ashore and wrecked at Maryport.
Maas	Netherlands	The steamship ran aground at Maassluis, South Holland. She was on a voyage from New York, United States to Rotterdam, South Holland.
Said	France	The steamship ran aground in the Gironde 10 nautical miles (19 km) downstream of Bordeaux, Gironde.
Vine	United Kingdom	The steamship ran aground on the Saltscar Rocks, in the coast of Yorkshire. She was on a voyage from Grimsby, Lincolnshire to Hartlepool, County Durham. She was refloated the next day and completed her voyage.

== 21 January ==
List of shipwrecks: 21 January 1877
Ship	State	Description
Arthur	United Kingdom	The steamship was driven ashore at Scutari, Ottoman Empire. She was on a voyage from Sulina, Ottoman Empire to Marseille, Bouches-du-Rhône, France. Arthur was refloated on 25 January and towed into Constantinople, Ottoman Empire.
Barbara	United Kingdom	The schooner was driven ashore at Ross, Northumberland. She was on a voyage from Dundee, Forfarshire to Newcastle upon Tyne, Northumberland. She was refloated with assistance and taken into Lindisfarne, Northumberland.
Charleton	United Kingdom	The ship departed from Lymington, Hampshire for Bridgwater, Somerset. Although she subsequently called at Salcombe, Devon, she never reached her destination. Presumed foundered with the loss of all hands.
Keplar	United Kingdom	The steamship ran aground at "Schoniac".
Ocean Bride	(United Kingdom of Great Britain and Ireland) Guernsey	The brig was run into by a steamship in the River Thames at Blackwall, Middlesex and was beached. She was on a voyage from Guernsey to London. The hole was patched and she was taken into London.
Uruguay	United Kingdom	The brig was driven ashore and wrecked at Ayr. She was on a voyage from Cork to Ayr.

== 22 January ==
List of shipwrecks: 22 January 1877
Ship	State	Description
Angona	Russia	The steamship was wrecked on the Jadder Reef. Her crew were rescued. She was on a voyage from Hull, Yorkshire to Kristiansand, Norway.
Carpione	Italy	The ship was driven ashore at Cape Henry, Virginia. She was on a voyage from Leith, Lothian, United Kingdom to Baltimore, Maryland, United States. She was later refloated with assistance and taken into Norfolk, Virginia.
Fawn	United Kingdom	The ship was driven ashore in Bootle Bay. She was on a voyage from New York, United States to Liverpool, Lancashire.
Ida	Austria-Hungary	The brig was driven ashore at Maryport, Cumberland, United Kingdom. She was on a voyage from Queenstown, County Cork to Silloth, Cumberland. She was refloated and taken into Maryport in a leaky condition. She subsequently completed her voyage.
Lizzie	United Kingdom	The schooner collided with the barque Norway (United Kingdom) and sank in the Bristol Channel with the loss of a crew member. Survivors were rescued by Norway.
Mina	Germany	The ship was wrecked on Amrum. Her crew were rescued. She was on a voyage from Charleston, South Carolina, United States to Altona.
Morning Star	United Kingdom	The fishing smack ran aground on the Dogger Bank, off the coast of County Wexford. Her crew were rescued by a Customs boat.
Mountain Hare	United Kingdom	The fishing smack ran aground on the Dogger Bank. Her crew were rescued by the Rosslare Lifeboat Civil Service ( Royal National Lifeboat Institution).
Olivier	France	The ship was driven ashore near Hyères, Var. She was on a voyage from La Calle, Algeria to Marseille, Bouches-du-Rhône. She was refloated on 27 January.
Thomas	United Kingdom	The steamship ran aground on the Corton Sand, in the North Sea off the coast of Suffolk. She was on a voyage from Charleston, South Carolina, United States to Dieppe, Seine-Inférieure, France. She was refloated.
Unnamed	Board of Customs	The cutter was driven ashore in Bootle Bay.
Unnamed	Flag unknown	The schooner was driven ashore in Bootle Bay.

== 23 January ==
List of shipwrecks: 23 January 1877
Ship	State	Description
Alert	United Kingdom	The schooner ran aground on the Saltscar Rocks, on the coast of Yorkshire. She was on a voyage from London to Stockton-on-Tees, County Durham. She was refloated the next day and towed into Middlesbrough, Yorkshire.
Aurora	United Kingdom	The brig was wrecked near Ballantrae, Ayrshire. Her seven crew were rescued by the Ballantrae Lifeboat William and Harriett ( Royal National Lifeboat Institution). Aurora was on a voyage from Belfast, County Antrim to Troon, Ayrshire.
Eliza Jane	United States	The schooner was wrecked on Jig Rock, near Shelburne, Nova Scotia, Canada. The crew were saved.
Glasgow	United Kingdom	The steamship ran aground at Rotterdam, South Holland, Netherlands. She was on a voyage from Grangemouth, Stirlingshire to Rotterdam.
St. Louis	France	The brig was wrecked 18 nautical miles (33 km) north of "Galippia". She was on a voyage from La Calle, Algeria to Marseille, Bouches-du-Rhône.

== 24 January ==
List of shipwrecks: 24 January 1877
Ship	State	Description
Arabian	United Kingdom	The steamship ran aground at Bari, Italy. She was refloated on 13 February and was subsequently towed to Malta.
Essie	United Kingdom	The schooner was destroyed by fire off the Isles of Scilly. Her crew were rescued by the steamship Imbros (United Kingdom). Essie was to be on a voyage from London to Pomaron, Portugal.
Francesca	Austria-Hungary	The barque ran aground on the Luciweara Reef. She was on a voyage from South Shields, County Durham, United Kingdom of Great Britain and Ireland to Singapore, Straits Settlements.
Njaal	Netherlands	The barque collided with Olive Thurlow (United States) and sank off Bardsey Island, Pembrokeshire, United Kingdom. Her crew were rescued by Olive Thurlow.
Priscilla	United Kingdom	The ship departed from Charleston, Forfarshire for Boulogne, Pas-de-Calais, France. No further trace, reported missing.
Providence	France	The chasse-marée collided with a barque and was abandoned by her crew, who were rescued by the barque. She was towed into Ramsgate, Kent, United Kingdom by the tug Rienzi (United Kingdom).
Sophia	Germany	The barque ran aground on the Gunfleet Sand, in the North Sea off the coast of Essex, United Kingdom. She was on a voyage from Tonsberg to London, United Kingdom. She was refloated and found to be waterlogged.
Tiber	United Kingdom	The brig was wrecked on the Whiting Sand, in the North Sea off the coast of Essex and was abandoned by her crew, who were rescued by the pilot cutter Margaret (United Kingdom).
Triton	United Kingdom	The steamship ran aground in the River Severn at Sharpness Point, Gloucestershire. She was on a voyage from Gloucester to Cardiff, Glamorgan. She was refloated and resumed her voyage.

== 25 January ==
List of shipwrecks: 25 January 1877
Ship	State	Description
Coralline	United Kingdom	The schooner ran aground on the Maplin Sands, in the North Sea off the coast of Essex. She was refloated with the assistance of two smacks and assisted into Harwich, Essex in a severely leaky condition.
Countess of Seafield	United Kingdom	The ship was driven ashore north of Aberdeen. Her crew were rescued.
Dillwyn	United Kingdom	The ship ran aground on the Goodwin Sands, Kent with the loss of a crew member. She was on a voyage from London to the Natal Colony. She was refloated and taken into Ramsgate, Kent.
Ithuriel	United Kingdom	The barque ran aground on the Dromore Bank, off Waterford. She was on a voyage from Waterford to Liverpool, Lancashire.
Sarah	United Kingdom	The Mersey Flat ran aground and sank on the Horse Bank, in the Irish Sea off the coast of Lancashire. Her crew were rescued. She was on a voyage from the River Dee to Liverpool.

== 26 January ==
List of shipwrecks: 26 January 1877
Ship	State	Description
Champion	United States	The ship was driven ashore at Philadelphia, Pennsylvania. She was on a voyage from Philadelphia to Bremen.
E. B. Darling	United States	The schooner was driven ashore and wrecked on Gran Canaria, Canary Islands. Her crew were rescued.
Falcon	United States	The steamship was holed by ice and sank at Baltimore, Maryland.
Ferndinand van der Taelen	Flag unknown	The ship ran aground in the Bute Channel. She was on a voyage from Cardiff, Glamorgan, United Kingdom to Port Said, Egypt.
Friso	France	The ship was wrecked on Cape Breton Island, Nova Scotia, Canada.
Johannes	Germany	The galiot was driven ashore on Terschelling, Friesland, Netherlands. Her crew were rescued. She was on a voyage from Bo'ness, Lothian to Porto, Portugal. She was a total loss.
N. T. Hill	United Kingdom	The ship departed from Rangoon, Burma for a Channel port. No further trace, presumed foundered with the loss of all hands.
Result	France	The schooner was driven ashore at Port Isaac, Cornwall, United Kingdom. She was on a voyage from Granville, Manche to Cardiff.
Woodburn	United Kingdom	The steamship ran aground on the Eliza Reefs, in the Red Sea 30 nautical miles (56 km) north of Jeddah, Hejaz Vilayet. She was on a voyage from Cardiff, Glamorgan to Jeddah. She was refloated but then ran aground on the Abo u Seed Reef. Again refloated, she was taken into Jeddah.
Four unnamed vessels	Flags unknown	The ships were sunk by ice in Chesapeake Bay, each with the loss of all hands.

== 27 January ==
List of shipwrecks: 27 January 1877
Ship	State	Description
Cort Adler	Germany	The ship was wrecked near Soggendal, Norway. Her crew were rescued. She was on a voyage from Dysart, Fife, United Kingdom to Bremen.
Jessie	United Kingdom	The ship departed from Portsoy, Aberdeenshire for Newcastle upon Tyne, Northumberland. Ho further trace, reported missing.
Raoul	France	The schooner was abandoned off Hartland Point, Devon, United Kingdom. She was on a voyage from Granville, Manche to Cardiff, Glamorgan, United Kingdom.
Star	(United Kingdom of Great Britain and Ireland) Isle of Man	The schooner collided with the Mersey Ferry Woodside (United Kingdom) in the River Mersey and sank. Her four crew were rescued by Woodside.

== 28 January ==
List of shipwrecks: 28 January 1877
Ship	State	Description
La Belle	United Kingdom	The brig was wrecked on the Scroby Sands, Norfolk. Her eight crew were rescued by the Caister Lifeboat Godsend ( Royal National Lifeboat Institution). La Belle was on a voyage from South Shields, County Durham to Poole, Dorset.
Marie	France	The barque collided with the brig Heimdal (Norway) and sank off the Eddystone Lighthouse, Cornwall, United Kingdom with the loss of four of her eleven crew. Survivors were rescued by Heimdal. Marie was on a voyage from Havre de Grâce, Seine-Inférieure to Haiti.
Onore	Austria-Hungary	The barque was driven ashore and wrecked at Venice, Italy with the loss of five of her crew. She was on a voyage from Sulina, Ottoman Empire to Venice.

== 29 January ==
List of shipwrecks: 29 January 1877
Ship	State	Description
Augusta	Denmark	The brig was driven ashore on Læsø. She was on a voyage from Hartlepool, County Durham, United Kingdom to Copenhagen.
Avon	United Kingdom	The trow foundered off the mouth of the River Avon with the loss of two of her crew. Survivors were rescued by a pilot boat. She was on a voyage from Lydney to Bristol, Gloucestershire.
Ella	United Kingdom	The ship departed from New York, United States for London. No further trace, reported missing.
Emerald	United Kingdom	The ship was severely damaged in a gale at Ayr.
Example	United Kingdom	The ship was severely damaged in a gale at Ayr.
Herald	United Kingdom	The ship was severely damaged in a gale at Ayr.
La Belle	United Kingdom	The brig was wrecked on Scroby Sands, Norfolk. Her eight crew were rescued by the Caister Lifeboat Godsend ( Royal National Lifeboat Institution).
Lisbonnais	France	The ship departed from Marans, Charente-Inférieure for Goole, Yorkshire, United Kingdom. No further trace, posted missing.
Lizzie Male	United Kingdom	The ship was abandoned off Gowan Head, Cornwall. Her crew were rescued by the Newquay Lifeboat Pendock Neale ( Royal National Lifeboat Institution). Lizzie Male was on a voyage from Swansea, Glamorgan to Fécamp, Seine-Inférieure, France.
Miranda	United Kingdom	The ship ran aground on the Kentish Knock. She was on a voyage from Leith, Lothian to Smyrna, Ottoman Empire. She was refloated and put into Dover, Kent in a leaky condition.
Mountaineer	United Kingdom	The ship was severely damaged in a gale at Ayr.
Rebecca and Mary	United Kingdom	The schooner was abandoned off Porthdinllaen, Caernarfonshire. Her five crew were rescued by the Porthdinllaen Lifeboat.
Star of the Sea	United Kingdom	The ship was damaged in a gale at Ayr.
Unity	United Kingdom	The ship was severely damaged in a gale at Ayr.

== 30 January ==
List of shipwrecks: 30 January 1877
Ship	State	Description
Constantia	United Kingdom	The barque ran aground on the Scroby Sands, Norfolk. Her twelve crew were rescued by the Caister Lifeboat Mark Lane ( Royal National Lifeboat Institution). Constantia was on a voyage from Sunderland, County Durham to Batavia, Netherlands East Indies.
Delta	United Kingdom	The ship was driven ashore and wrecked at Tripoli, Ottoman Tripolitania. Her crew were rescued.
Elf	Denmark	The brig was driven ashore 2 nautical miles (3.7 km) west of Dunkirk, Nord, France. Her crew were rescued. She was on a voyage from Tønsberg, Norway to Tabasco.
Four Brothers	United Kingdom	The ship was driven ashore and wrecked at Southsea, Hampshire. She was on a voyage from Southampton to Portsmouth.
Jones Brothers	United Kingdom	The steamship sank at Burnham-on-Sea, Somerset.
Joseph Marie	France	The ship was driven ashore at the Mumbles, Glamorgan, United Kingdom. She was on a voyage from Bordeaux, Gironde to Swansea, Glamorgan. She was refloated and towed into Swansea.
Marie	France	The smack collided with the schooner Railway (United Kingdom) and was abandoned off Dungeness, Kent, United Kingdom and was abandoned. Her crew were rescued by Railway.
Mary Kate	United Kingdom	The schooner was driven ashore at Peel, Isle of Man. Her crew of at least five men were rescued by rocket apparatus. She was on a voyage from Newry, County Antrim to Bristol, Gloucestershire.
Primrose	United Kingdom	The fishing trawler was driven ashore at Queen Anne's Point, Devon. She was refloated with assistance from the tug Volunteer (United Kingdom) and found to be severely leaky.
Ringer	United Kingdom	The sloop was driven ashore at Bridgwater.
Royal George	United Kingdom	The barque was driven ashore and wrecked at Tripoli. Her crew were rescued.
Sophia	United Kingdom	The ship was driven ashore in the Dollart. She was on a voyage from Emden, Germany to London.
Unnamed	United Kingdom	The ship was driven ashore and wrecked at Southsea, Hampshire. Her crew were rescued. She was on a voyage from Swanage, Dorset to Southampton, Hampshire.

== 31 January ==
List of shipwrecks: 31 January 1877
Ship	State	Description
Colorado	United Kingdom	The ship ran aground at Dunkirk, Nord, France. She was on a voyage from Pisagua, Chile to Dunkirk.
Doctor	United Kingdom	The ship was driven ashore in the Belfast Lough. She was on a voyage from Portaferry, County Down to Cardiff, Glamorgan.
Emily, and Henry	United Kingdom	The Thames barges were run into by the steamship Rainbow (United Kingdom) and sank at Blackwall, Middlesex. One life was lost.
Hafod	United Kingdom	The schooner struck a sunken rock and sank at Fowey, Cornwall. .
Harmine	Germany	The ship was wrecked on Juist with the loss of all hands.
Marguerite	France	The schooner foundered in the North Sea 8 nautical miles (15 km) west south west of Texel, North Holland, Netherlands. Her crew were rescued by the fishing smack Blue Belle (United Kingdom). Marguerite was on a voyage from Skien, Norway to Fécamp, and /or Havre de Grâce, Seine-Inférieure.
Pellicano	United Kingdom	The ship ran aground at Philadelphia, Pennsylvania, United States. She was on a voyage from Philadelphia to Cork. She was holed by ice, refloated and put back to Philadelphia in a leaky condition.
Rhondda	United Kingdom	The steamship ran aground at Smyrna, Ottoman Empire. She was on a voyage from Smyrna to Bristol, Gloucestershire.
Ulysses	Netherlands	The steamship was driven ashore at Egmond aan Zee, North Holland with the loss of nine of her 28 crew. She was on a voyage from Cádiz, Spain to Amsterdam, North Holland.
West Stanley	United Kingdom	The steamship was driven ashore near Resaglia Point, Ottoman Empire. She was on a voyage from Newcastle upon Tyne, Northumberland to Constantinople, Ottoman Empire. She was refloated with the assistance of a tug.
Zancia	Italy	The steamship collided with Petunia (United Kingdom) in the River Mersey and was beached. She was on a voyage from Palermo, Sicily to Liverpool, Lancashire, United Kingdom.
Unnamed	Flag unknown	The ship was driven ashore 2 nautical miles (3.7 km) west of Dunkirk.
Unnamed	United Kingdom	The brigantine was driven ashore at Spurn Point, Yorkshire. Her crew survived.

== Unknown date ==
List of shipwrecks: Unknown date in January 1877
Ship	State	Description
Ada Iredale	United Kingdom	The ship caught fire in the Atlantic Ocean and was abandoned before 27 January. Her crew were rescued. She was on a voyage from Ardrossan, Ayrshire to San Francisco, California, United States.
Adrienne	France	The ship was driven ashore at La Trinité-sur-Mer, Morbihan. She was on a voyage from Santander, Spain to Cardiff, Glamorgan, United Kingdom. She was refloated and taken into La Trinité-sur-Mer. She was placed under repair.
Amizade	Portugal	The barque was abandoned in the Atlantic Ocean. Her crew were rescued by the steamship Nankin (United Kingdom). Amizade was on a voyage from São Miguel Island, Azores to New York, United States.
Ann Alice	United Kingdom	The ship was driven ashore at "Bowingneuf", Vendée, France.
Annie Cecilie	United Kingdom	The schooner was driven ashore at "Gronhoe", near Hjorring, Denmark. Her crew were rescued. She was on a voyage from Charlestown, Cornwall to Horsens, Denmark.
Annie Gray	United Kingdom	The ship was wrecked on the Double Rock, off Yantai, China. Her crew were rescued.
B. F. Metcalfe	United States	The ship was driven ashore at New York. She was on a voyage from Liverpool, Lancashire, United Kingdom to New York. She was refloated.
Carolina Louisa	Norway	The brig was abandoned at sea. Her crew were rescued by Stabel (Flag unknown).
Christine	United Kingdom	The ship was wrecked on Java, Netherlands East Indies before 5 January. She was on a voyage from Java to the English Channel.
Commodore	United States	The ship was driven ashore and wrecked at Cape Flattery, Washington Territory before 15 January. She was on a voyage from New York to San Francisco, California
C. W. Anderson	United Kingdom	The steamship ran aground at Huelva, Spain. She was on a voyage from Huelva to Liverpool.
Deane	United Kingdom	The ship sank at Gravelines, Nord, France. She was on a voyage from West Hartlepool, County Durham to Gravelines.
Delphine	France	The barque was driven ashore north of Cape Charles, Virginia, United States. She was on a voyage from Martinique to Baltimore, Maryland, United States. She was refloated and taken into Norfolk, Virginia.
D. E. Woodbury	United States	The fishing schooner was reportedly last seen in December 1876 or January 1877 off Seal Island. Lost with all ten crewmen.
D. R. Stockwell	United States	The ship was wrecked on the Hogsty Reef. She was on a voyage from Troon, Ayrshire, United Kingdom to Cárdenas, Cuba.
Duke of Sutherland	United Kingdom	The steamship was driven ashore at Madras, India. She was refloated on 4 February and resumed her voyage.
Figlia d'Italia	United Kingdom	The ship was driven ashore between Middlesbrough, Yorkshire and Stockton-on-Tees, County Durham. She was on a voyage from Alexandria, Egypt to Stockton-on-Tees. She was refloated on 19 January.
Gem	United Kingdom	The brig ran aground on the Gunfleet Sand, in the North Sea off the coast of Essex. She was on a voyage from Newcastle upon Tyne, Northumberland to London. She was refloated with the assistance of seven smacks and assisted into the River Colne.
George Green	United States	The ship was wrecked or foundered off the south coast of Devon, United Kingdom with the loss of all hands, about 30 lives. She was on a voyage from one of the guano islands to Falmouth, Cornwall or Queenstown, County Cork.
Golden Love	United Kingdom	The ship was driven ashore at "Elissoer". Her crew were rescued.
Gustaf	Sweden	The schooner was driven ashore on Læsø, Denmark. She was on a voyage from Pori, Grand Duchy of Finland to Hartlepool, County Durham. She was later refloated.
Highland Light	United States	The ship ran aground on the Blossom Rock. She was on a voyage from Vallejo to San Francisco, California. She was refloated.
Hilding	Sweden	The brig was abandoned at sea with the loss of a crew member. Survivors were rescued by the brig Donnerstag (Germany).
Hudson	United States	The barque was driven ashore at Core Point, in Chesapeake Bay. She was on a voyage from Callao, Peru to Baltimore. She was refloated. She was refloated and taken into Baltimore.
Island Belle	United Kingdom	The schooner was abandoned at sea. Four of her crew were rescued on 24 January by Celtic (United Kingdom.
Jessie B. Smith	United States	The ship was driven ashore at Lewes, Delaware. She was on a voyage from Bilbao, Spain to Philadelphia, Pennsylvania. She was refloated on 7 January.
Johanna	Germany	The ship was abandoned in the North Sea. Her crew survived. She was on a voyage from Hull, Yorkshire, United Kingdom to Stralsund.
Joseph	United Kingdom	The ship was driven ashore at Norfolk, Virginia, United States.
Kronprinz Gustav	Sweden	The schooner was driven ashore at "Karang Hadjee", Netherlands East Indies. She was on a voyage from Hong Kong to London. She was later refloated and towed into "Munlok", Netherlands East Indies.
Lilla	Italy	The barque was driven ashore at Cape Henry, Virginia, United States. She was on a voyage from Ipswich, Suffolk, United Kingdom to Baltimore.
Louisa	United Kingdom	The ship was abandoned in the Atlantic Ocean 200 nautical miles (370 km) off New York. Her crew were rescued by Magnolia (United States). Louisa was on a voyage from Murray to New York.
Lucy	United Kingdom	The ship was abandoned in the Atlantic Ocean off New York. Her crew were rescued. She was on a voyage from Cape Breton Island, Nova Scotia, Canada to Cárdenas.
Luigia Rocca	Italy	The brig ran aground at "Lampsakus Point", near Gallipoli, Ottoman Empire. She was on a voyage from Sulina, Ottoman Empire to Falmouth.
Marguerite	France	The ship foundered at sea. She was on a voyage from Garrucha, Spain to Marseille, Bouches-du-Rhône.
Marousso	Greece	The brig was driven ashore at "Dogaullau". She was on a voyage from Samsoun, Ottoman Empire to an English port.
Mary Banfield	United Kingdom	The ship foundered in the Atlantic Ocean. Her crew were rescued. She was on a voyage from Antwerp, Belgium to Caminha, Portugal.
Mary Burnham	United States	The schooner was lost off the LaHave Bank with the loss of all eleven crew.
Mary Kate	United Kingdom	The schooner was driven ashore at Peel, Isle of Man. Her crew were rescued. She was on a voyage from Newry, County Antrim to Bristol, Gloucestershire.
Moses Adams	United States	The schooner was wrecked off Long Harbour, Newfoundland Colony. Her crew were rescued .
Nancy Brysson	United Kingdom	The ship was lost whilst on a voyage from Pernambuco, Brazil to New York, United States. Her crew survived.
Nautilus	Germany	The ship was wrecked in the North Sea. Her crew were rescued by the smack Grace Darling (United Kingdom).
Norham	United Kingdom	The barque ran aground in the Sea of Azov. She was on a voyage from Taganrog, Russia to Falmouth. She was refloated and resumed her voyage.
Nouveau Mexique	France	The ship was driven ashore and wrecked at Sadras, India. She was on a voyage from Réunion to Pondicherry, India.
Ocean Home	United Kingdom	The barque was driven ashore on Doboy Island, Georgia, United States. She was on a voyage from Milford Haven, Pembrokeshire to Doboy Island.
P. G. Blanchard	Canada	The ship ran aground on the Blossom Rock. She was on a voyage from Vallejo to San Francisco. She was refloated.
Rebie	United Kingdom	The ship was abandoned in the Atlantic Ocean. Her seven crew were rescued by Lady Belhaven (United Kingdom).
Romano	France	The ship was abandoned before 25 January. Her crew were rescued by Blanche (United Kingdom). Romano was on a voyage from Swansea, Glamorgan to Tarragona, Spain.
Sarah J. A. Frost	United States	The ship was driven ashore in Vineyard Sound. She was on a voyage from Demerara, British Guiana to Boston, Massachusetts.
Sophie	Germany	The ship was abandoned in the North Sea. Her crew were rescued by Balder (Sweden). Sophie was on a voyage from Stockholm, Sweden to Leith, Lothian, United Kingdom.
Speculator	Canada	The ship was wrecked on the Dog Rocks. She was on a voyage from Hamburg, Germany to New Orleans, Louisiana, United States.
St. Patrick	United Kingdom	The steamship was driven ashore in Chesapeake Bay. She was on a voyage from Glasgow, Renfrewshire to Baltimore.
Tern	United Kingdom	The steamship was driven ashore. She was on a voyage from Liverpool to Antwerp She was refloated and taken into Antwerp, where she arrived on 18 January.
Teviotdale	United Kingdom	The ship caught fire at sea and was abandoned. Her crew were rescued by the schooner Barso (United Kingdom). Teviotdale was on a voyage from Dundee, Forfarshire to Bombay, India.
Tocantin	Brazil	The ship was driven ashore and wrecked at Pará.
Trio	United Kingdom	The schooner was driven ashore on the coast of Lincolnshire. She was on a voyage from London to Newcastle upon Tyne. Trio was refloated on 13 January, and taken into Grimsby, Lincolnshire on 17 January.
Venus	United Kingdom	The smack was driven ashore in Kilkerran Bay.
Wamvar	United Kingdom	The ship barque was abandoned in the Bay of Biscay. Her crew were rescued by HMS Dwarf (Royal Navy). Wamvar was on a voyage from Newport, Monmouthshire to Matanzas, Cuba.
Yan Gan	(United Kingdom of Great Britain and Ireland) British Burma	The ship foundered between Cheduba Island and "Laidong". She was on a voyage from Cheduba Island to Rangoon.
