= Port Isaac Lifeboat Station =

RNLI lifeboat Station in Cornwall, England

- Gorsav skath sawya Porthysek

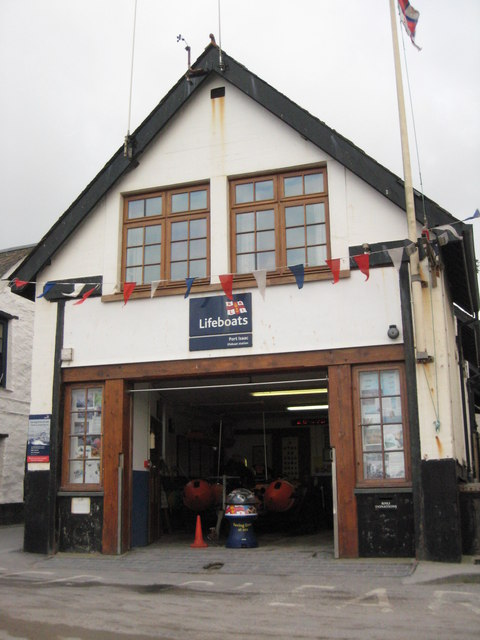
- 1927 Port Isaac Boathouse in 2009

- Location within Cornwall

General information
- Type: Lifeboat station
- Location: Middle Street, Port Isaac, Cornwall, PL29 3RL, United Kingdom
- Coordinates: 50.59220°N 4.83139°W
- Opened: 1869
- Owner: Royal National Lifeboat Institution

Website
- rnli.org/find-my-nearest/lifeboat-stations/port-isaac-lifeboat-station

Port Isaac Lifeboat Station (Cornish: Gorsav skath sawya Porthysek) sits at the head of the harbour on Middle Street in Port Isaac, a fishing village on the north-west coast of the county of Cornwall, England.

A lifeboat station was established at Port Isaac by the Royal National Lifeboat Institution (RNLI) in 1869, operating until 1933. A lifeboat station was re-established in 1967, with the placement of a D-class Inshore lifeboat.

The station currently operates a D-class (IB1) Inshore lifeboat (ILB), Pride of Port Isaac (Goeth Porthusek) (D-843), on station since 2019.

== History ==
Ever since its founding in 1824, the Royal National Institution for the Preservation of Life from Shipwreck (RNIPLS), later to become the RNLI in 1854, would award medals for deeds of gallantry at sea, even if no lifeboats were involved.

Sixteen men and a pilot were rescued from the ship Defence of Liverpool, when it was wrecked at St Juliot on 13 March 1858. Chief Boatman of HM Coastguard William Henry Tregidgo and four other coastguards were each awarded the RNLI Silver Medal.

On 25 October 1859, local fisherman Charles Mitchell was one of a crew who put off in a small boat on three occasions, to rescue the crew of four of the sloop Busy. For his "great courage and perseverance", Mitchell was awarded the silver medal. Mitchell would be awarded a second silver medal in 1870, for his work first with the Rocket Brigade, and then as part of the lifeboat crew, which saw the rescue of all twelve crew of the brig Stephano Grosso of Genoa, which had been driven ashore and wrecked at Port Isaac in a north-easterly gale, whilst on passage from Sulina to Hull.

At a meeting of the RNLI committee of management on Thursday 3 June 1869, following the request by local residents for a lifeboat, "as it was thought, would probably be useful there, especially to the crews of fishing-boats, which sometimes had to run for the port at great risk", and on the recommendation of the Inspector of Lifeboats, it was resolved to establish a lifeboat station at Port Isaac. East India merchant Richard Thornton West, and Sarah West, of Streatham and Exeter, who had previously funded the establishment of a lifeboat station at West Wittering, presented the sum of £700 for the provision of a lifeboat at Port Isaac, and its first year's expenses.

A 32-foot-long (9.8 m) self-righting 'Pulling and Sailing' (P&S) lifeboat, one with sails and (10) oars, was constructed by Forrestt of Limehouse, London, at a cost of £246, and on 6 October 1869, was dispatched by rail along with its carriage to Bodmin Road railway station, carried from Bristol free of charge by the Bristol and Exeter and South Devon railway companies.

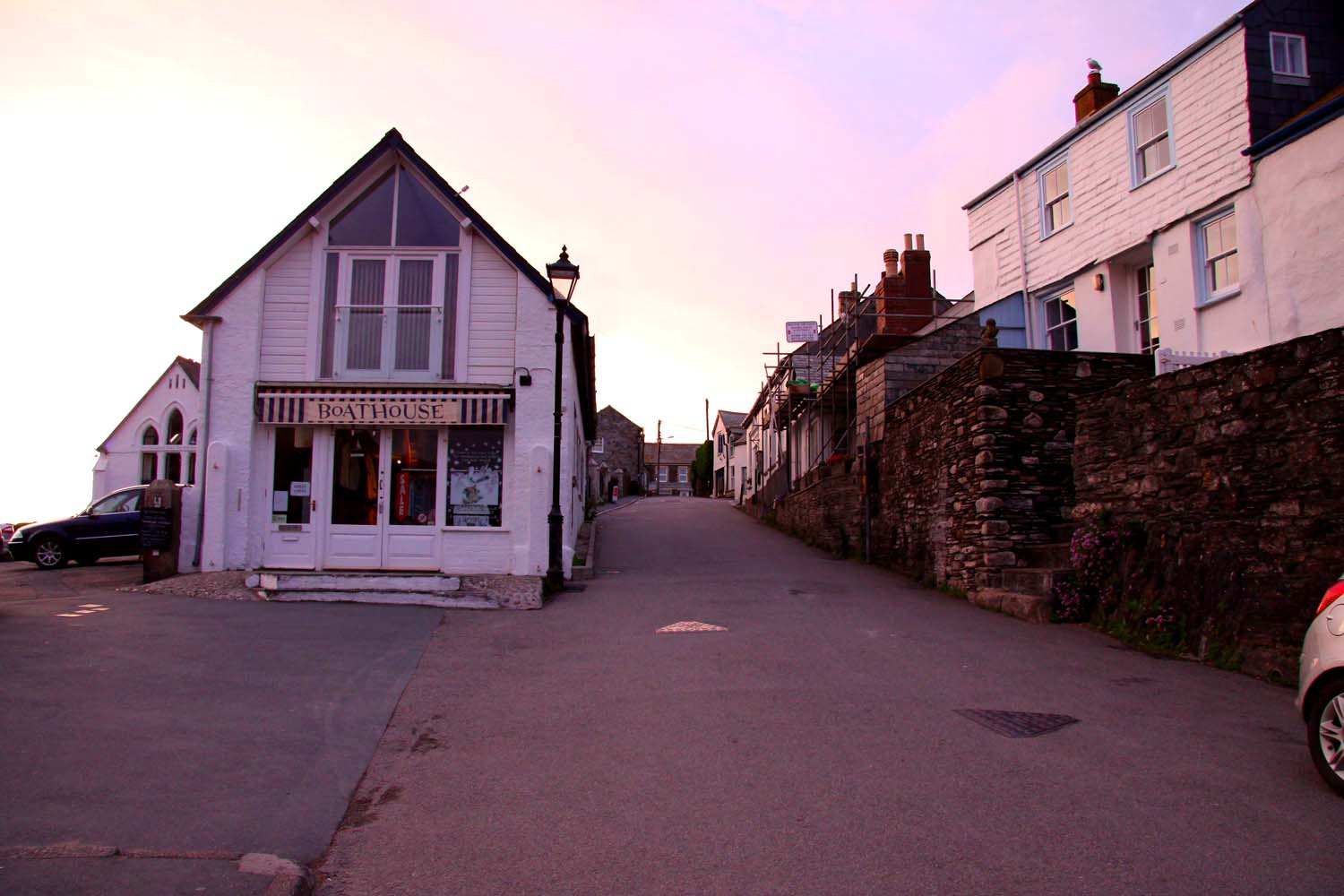
1869 Port Isaac Boathouse

From there, the lifeboat was hauled on its carriage by horses, through the town of Wadebridge to Port Isaac. There a large crowd had turned out to welcome the new lifeboat, which was then named Richard and Sarah after the donors. A site for a lifeboat house on Fore Street 50°35′35.1″N 4°49′55.0″W, on the hill at the east side of the village, was presented to the Institution by Lord Robartes, and a boathouse, still standing today, was constructed there in 1869, at a cost of £230. The lifeboat had to be wrestled down through the narrow streets to the shore on a carriage for each launch, and then hauled back up the hill to the boathouse afterwards.

The lifeboat capsized on 25 March 1880 whilst on exercise, but fortunately, without loss of life. When it was replaced seven years later in 1887, it had been launched on service a total of just eight times, but saved 57 lives. Her replacement was another 34 ft (10 m) lifeboat funded by the West family, and again took the name Richard and Sarah (ON 135).

Having served as coxswain since the station opened in 1869, James Haynes retired in 1895. For his service over 26 years, including the following rescues, Haynes was awarded the RNLI Silver Medal.

- 24 October 1870, brig Stefano Grosso of Genoa. Saved three lives.
- 20 November 1872, Fishing luggers Castle and J. T. K of Port Isaac. Saved eight lives.
- 20 February 1877, barque Ada Melmore of Maryport. Saved 10 lives.
- 26 March 1882, schooner British Queen of Wexford. Saved four lives.
- 14 October 1886, steamship Indus of Dundee. Saved 25 lives.
- 7 November 1890, schooner Golden Light of Penzance. Saved five lives.
- 2 January 1895, barque Antoinette of Saint John, New Brunswick Saved 10 lives.

Richard and Sarah (ON 135) was in turn replaced in 1905, having been launched on service nine times, saving 28 lives. The replacement boat had previously served at Drogheda No.1 as the Charles Whitton (ON 334), but on arrival at Port Isaac, the lifeboat once again took the name Richard and Sarah. 10 launches over the next 22 years resulted in just one life saved. In 1927, a 35 ft (11 m) lifeboat, Edward Dresden (ON 662), previously at Courtown, was sent to the station. To house the new larger boat, a new boathouse was built on a plot next to Middle street, at the head of the harbour.

Although the Port Isaac lifeboat now had direct access to the beach, Edward Dresden was never launched on service. After just 6 years, with a motor-powered lifeboat already at Padstow just 7 miles (11 km) to the south, at a meeting of the RNLI committee of management on 28 April 1933, it was decided to close Port Isaac Lifeboat Station.

Operating for a total of 64 years, the Port Isaac lifeboat had been launched 18 times, and saved 86 lives. The Ernest Dresden was sold from service. The first boathouse became a shop and the second was converted to be a garage for the adjacent hotel.

== 1967 onwards ==
In 1964, in response to an increasing amount of water-based leisure activity, the RNLI placed 25 small fast Inshore lifeboats around the country. These were easily launched with just a few people, ideal to respond quickly to local emergencies.

As more stations opened, it was decided to re-establish the lifeboat station at Port Isaac, and a D-class (RFD PB16) lifeboat (D-139) was placed there in June 1967. The lifeboat was housed in a modified fish cellar on the beach.

At 11:48 on October 5 1975, Port Isaac coastguard were informed that 30 bullocks had stampeded over the 150 ft (46 m) cliff at Port Quin. 15 had been killed by the fall, and a further five that were injured were euthanised by a veterinary surgeon. The Port Isaac Cliff Rescue Company, including four RNLI crew members, started to effect a rescue for the rest. A helicopter was called, but couldn't help due to the location of the animals. With a rising tide and worsening weather, the ILB was called to stand by. When one bullock started swimming away, it was quickly lassoed by one of the crew, but it proved impossible to bring the animal back. Released, it swam away but later drowned. Eventually, just five animals were hauled up the cliff to safety.

March 1994 would see the completion of work to the ground floor of the Slipway Hotel, returning what was the former 1927 lifeboat station back to active service, once again becoming the Port Isaac Lifeboat Station, providing much improved housing for the ILB and launch vehicle, along with up-to-date crew facilities.

In 2014, chairman of the Port Isaac fundraising branch Robert 'Bob' Bulgin was awarded the British Empire Medal for charitable services.

A naming ceremony was held on Saturday 9 November 2019, for Port Isaac's latest lifeboat. A fundraising appeal started in 2017 raised sufficient funds to provide a new D-class (IB1) Inshore lifeboat, with the boat arriving in Port Isaac in October 2019. After a service of dedication held by Rev. Elizabeth Wild, Rector of the North Cornwall cluster of churches in the diocese of Truro, the lifeboat was named Pride of Port Isaac (Goeth Porthusek) (D-843) by Bob Bulgin and Cornish bard Jon Cleave. The addition of the Cornish language in the name of the new D-Class lifeboat was formally commended by Tim Hambly, a bard of the Cornish Gorsedh.

=== Spirit of the PCS RE (D-517) ===
What was once a common occurrence in the days of P&S lifeboats, in 1998, Port Isaac suffered what is now fortunately a rare event - the loss of a lifeboat. A fundraising campaign by the Postal and Courier Services of the Royal Engineers resulted in the provision of a new D-class (EA16) Inshore lifeboat for Port Isaac, Spirit of the PCS RE (D-517), placed on service on 29 May 1997. Just over 15 months later, on 6 September 1998, the lifeboat was launched at 16:56 to reports of a boy being washed out to sea, 7 miles (11 km) to the north at Bossiney. Arriving on scene within 30 minutes, it transpired that the boy's father was also missing, both casualties presumed washed into a cave near Tintagel.

In surf breaking up to 15–20 ft (4.6–6.1 m) high, the lifeboat dropped anchor, and was attempting to veer down to the cave, when a huge wave washed two crew members overboard, trapping Mike Edkins on the rocks, and washing Helm Kevin Dingle into the cave. Third crew member Paul Pollington used all his effort with the anchor warp, to haul himself and the lifeboat away from the cave entrance, but before he could restart the engine, the boat swung around towards the rocks, and he was rescued by a helicopter from RAF Chivenor. The lifeboat was gradually washed into the cave, hitting Mike Edkins, which freed him from the rocks. By 18:00, the lifeboat had broken up, with the smell of fuel pervading the cave. The Tyne-class lifeboat had arrived from Padstow, along with a second helicopter from RNAS Culdrose, and efforts to rescue the four people continued, but it was only when the tide receded at 21:30, that all four could be brought from the cave, and airlifted to hospital.

Kevin Dingle and Mike Edkins were accorded 'The Thanks of the Institution inscribed on Vellum', with Paul Pollington receiving 'A framed letter of thanks from the Chairman of the Institution'. Port Isaac's previous lifeboat Peter and Molly Tabor (D-366) was immediately returned to Port Isaac, with the station fully operational by 03:00 on the 7 September. After another two years of fundraising, Spirit of the PCS RE II (D-546) entered service at Port Isaac on 3 June 1999.

=== Notable service ===
On the morning of Easter Sunday 8 April 2012, Peter Sleeman (60) and his son Paul (27) were walking back from fishing, when Paul was swept off the rocks into the sea, beneath the cliffs at Tregardock. A line was thrown by Peter, but then he too was swept into the sea. Spotted by a walker sometime later, the Port Isaac lifeboat Copeland Bell (D-707) was launched at 08:19, into force 4–5 winds, with 3 m (9.8 ft) waves on a high spring tide, arriving on scene within seven minutes. Assessing the situation, and seeing the men being thrown about in the boiling surf, the crew immediately decided to take the boat in. The anchor was dropped, and with the bow of the lifeboat held facing the incoming waves, the boat veered down to within 3 m (9.8 ft) of the casualties. The younger man was the only one to show signs of life, and he was hauled aboard the boat. It was then that the engine cut out. It restarted quickly, but at that point, the priority was the care of Paul. A life-jacket was fitted to the body of the father, to ease later retrieval, and the lifeboat set out to rendezvous with a rescue helicopter, with Paul airlifted to the Royal Cornwall Hospital in Treliske. The father's body was then retrieved.

In recognition of their courage, boat handling skill, initiative and leadership in very difficult sea conditions, to save the life of Paul Sleeman, Helm Damien Bolton was awarded the RNLI Silver Medal. His two crew, Nicola Bradbury and Matthew Main, were each awarded the RNLI Bronze Medal.

== Station honours ==
The following are awards made at Port Isaac:

- RNLI Silver Medal
  William Henry Tregidgo, Chief boatman, HM Coastguard, Boscastle – 1858 (Second-service clasp)
  James Stone, Chief boatman, HM Coastguard, Boscastle – 1858
  John Pascoe Sharrock, Commissioned boatman, HM Coastguard, Boscastle – 1858
  William Richard May, boatman, HM Coastguard, Boscastle – 1858
  H Ellis, boatman, HM Coastguard, Boscastle – 1858
  Charles Mitchell, fisherman – 1859
  Charles Mitchell, fisherman – 1870 (Second-service clasp)
  James Haynes, Coxswain – 1895
  Damien Bolton, Helm – 2013
- RNLI Bronze Medal
  Nicola Bradbury, crew member – 2013
  Matthew Main, crew member – 2013
- 'The Thanks of the Institution inscribed on Vellum'
  Clive F. Martin, Helm – 1977
  Mark J. Provis, Helm – 1978
  Edward J. Fletcher, crew member – 1978
  Kevin Dingle, Helm – 1998
  Mike Edkins, crew member – 1998
- 'Vellum Service Certificates'
  Port Isaac ILB crew – 1977
- 'A Framed Letter of Thanks signed by the Chairman of the Institution'
  Paul Pollington, crew member – 1998
  Kenneth C. Richards, Station Officer, Port Isaac Auxiliary Coastguard – 1998
  Andrew Cameron, Helm – 2013
- Certificate of Merit, awarded by the RSPCA
  Port Isaac Lifeboat Station – 1975
  Port Isaac Cliff Rescue Company – 1975
- British Empire Medal
  Robert Bulgin, chairman, Port Isaac fundraising branch – 2014NYH

== Port Isaac lifeboats ==
=== Pulling and sailing lifeboats ===
On station	ON (Note: ON is the RNLI's Official Number of the boat.)	Name	Built	Class	Comments
1869–1887	Pre-537	Richard and Sarah	1869	34-foot Prowse self-righting (P&S)	(Note: 32 ft 0 in (9.75 m) x 7 ft 7 in (2.31 m) (10-oared) Prowse-class self-righting (P&S) lifeboat, gift of Mr and Mrs Thornton West of Streatham, built by Forrestt of Limehouse, London, costing £246.); Sold in 1887.
1887–1905	135	Richard and Sarah	1887	34-foot self-righting (P&S)	(Note: 34 ft 0 in (10.36 m) x 7 ft 6 in (2.29 m) (10-oared) self-righting (P&S) lifeboat, gift of Mr and Mrs Thornton West of Streatham, built by Forrestt of Limehouse, London, costing £406.); Sold in 1905. Renamed Foam, last reported as a felucca at Southampton in 1932.
1905–1917	334	Richard and Sarah	1892	34-foot self-righting (P&S)	(Note: 34 ft 0 in (10.36 m) x 7 ft 6 in (2.29 m) (10-oared) self-righting (P&S) lifeboat, legacy of Mr C. H. Whitton of Fawley, later funded by the gift of Mr and Mrs Thornton West of Streatham and Exeter, built by Forrestt of Limehouse, London, costing £437 when new.); Previously Charles Whitton at Drogheda No.1.
Station Closed 1917–1919
1919–1927	334	Richard and Sarah	1892	34-foot self-righting (P&S)	Sold in 1927.
1927–1933	662	Ernest Dresden	1917	35-foot Rubie self-righting (P&S)	(Note: 35 ft 0 in (10.67 m) x 8 ft 10 in (2.69 m) (10-oared) Rubie-class self-righting (P&S) lifeboat, legacy of Mr E. Dresden of Cavendish Square, built by S. E. Saunders of Cowes, costing £1,974 when new.); Previously at Courtown. Sold in 1933. Fully restored at River Yonne, Migennes, France, December 2024.

Station closed, 1933
Pre ON numbers are unofficial numbers used by the Lifeboat Enthusiasts' Society to reference early lifeboats not included on the official RNLI list.

=== Inshore lifeboats ===
==== D class ====
On station	Op.No. (Note: Op.No. is the RNLI's Operational Number of the boat carried on the hull.)	Name	Class	Comments
1967–1977	D-139	Unnamed	D-class (RFD PB16)	
1978–1988	D-257	Unnamed	D-class (Zodiac III)	
1988–1997	D-366	Peter and Molly Tabor	D-class (EA16)	
1997–1998	D-517	Spirit of the PCS RE	D-class (EA16)	Wrecked on service, 6 September 1998.
1998–1999	D-366	Peter and Molly Tabor	D-class (EA16)	
1999–2009	D-546	Spirit of the PCS RE II	D-class (EA16)	
2009–2019	D-707	Copeland Bell	D-class (IB1)	
2019–	D-843	Pride of Port Isaac (Goeth Porthusek)	D-class (IB1)	

=== Launch and recovery tractors ===
On station	Op.No.	Reg.No.	Type	Comments
2010–2021	TA112	WA60 DHK	New Holland TC24D	
2021–2023	TA62	W475 WOD	New Holland TC27D	
2023–	TA137	WK71 JFJ	New Holland Boomer 25	

== See also ==
- List of RNLI stations
- List of former RNLI stations
- Royal National Lifeboat Institution lifeboats
