= Clogherhead Lifeboat Station =

RNLI lifeboat station in County Louth, Ireland

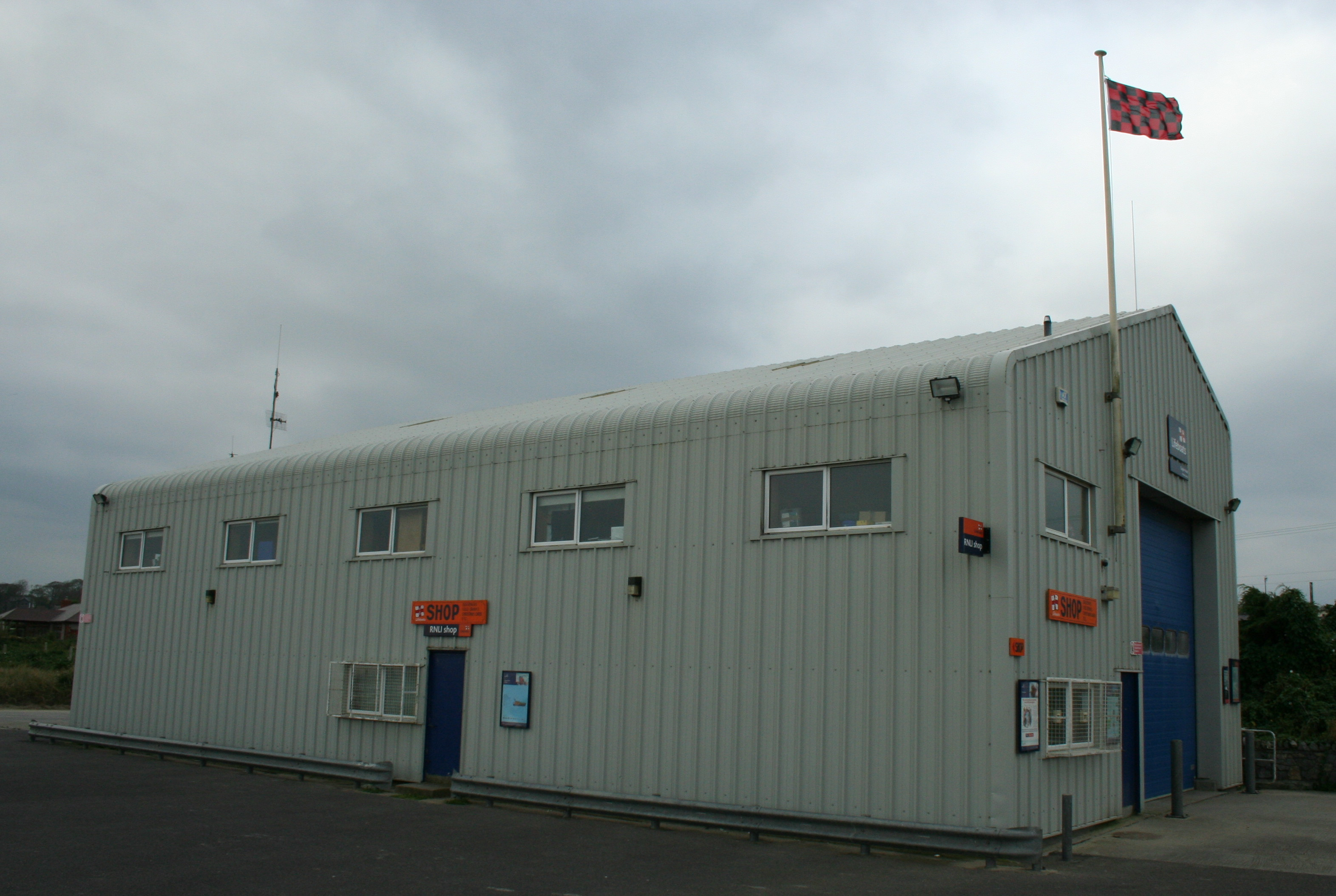
- Clogherhead Lifeboat Station

- Location within Ireland

General information
- Type: RNLI Lifeboat Station
- Location: Clogherhead Lifeboat Station, Clogherhead, County Louth, Ireland
- Coordinates: 53°47′18″N 6°14′7″W
- Opened: 1899
- Owner: Royal National Lifeboat Institution

Website
- Clogherhead RNLI Lifeboat Station

Clogherhead Lifeboat Station is situated at Clogherhead, a village 7.5 miles (12.1 km) north east of Drogheda, in County Louth, Ireland.

A lifeboat was first stationed at Clogherhead in 1899 by the Royal National Lifeboat Institution (RNLI), when operations were moved from Drogheda No.1.

The station currently operates the All-weather Shannon-class lifeboat, 13-31 Michael O'Brien (ON 1338), on station since 2019.

== History ==
In 1899, with the number of calls on the lifeboat in decline, due to fewer sailing vessels being at the mercy of the weather, it was decided to close one of the two Drogheda lifeboat stations located on the River Boyne estuary. Drogheda No.1 was closed, and operations were transferred to a new station at Clogherhead village, on the Clogher Head peninsular.

A galvanised-iron boathouse was constructed on a concrete base on the south side of the headland, and a 35 ft (11 m) self-righting 'Pulling and Sailing' (P&S) lifeboat, one with sails and (10) oars, was built by Hollwey, of Windmill Lane, Dublin, costing £582. The boat was funded, as was the previous Drogheda No.1 lifeboat, from the legacy of £1,898-14s-8d from the late Mr. C.R. Whitton of Wimbledon, London, and was similarly named Charles Whitton (ON 428).

The first service for the lifeboat would come on 24 January 1900, when six men and the fishing boat Irish Girl were saved. The lifeboat would then not be required again until 1914, when four men were rescued from the fishing boat Cecilia of Balbriggan.

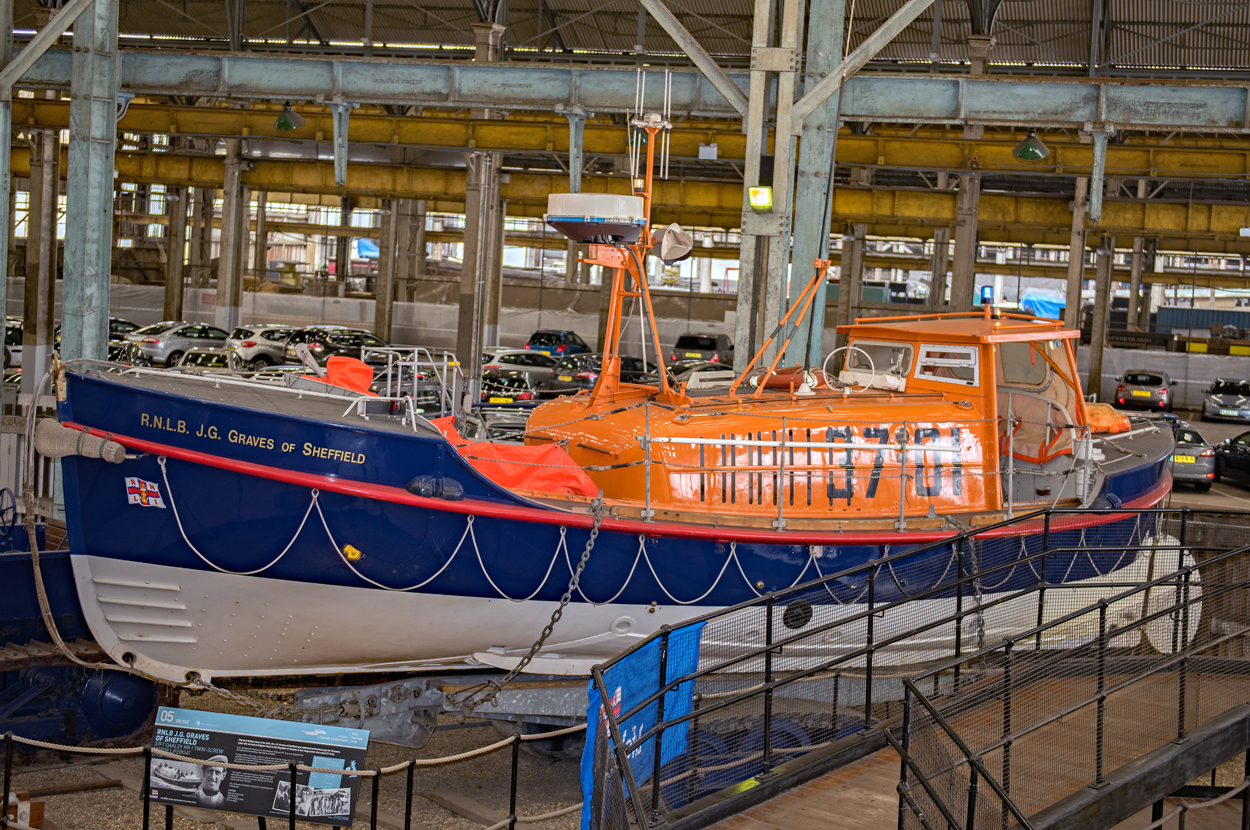
Clogherhead lifeboat 37-foot Oakley J. G. Graves at the RNLI Collection at Chatham Historic Dockyard

On 1 May 1916, Charles Whitton (ON 428) was launched to the steamship Isle of Arran of Glasgow. All 18 crewmen were rescued.

In 1927, the 35 ft (11 m) self-righting (P&S) lifeboat John Dunn (ON 638) was transferred to Clogherhead, following the closure of the Drogheda No.2 Lifeboat Station lifeboat station in 1926. In four years at Clogherhead, the boat was never called.

Clogherhead would see the arrival of their first motor-powered lifeboat in 1931. A 35-foot 6in self-righting (motor) lifeboat, built by J. Samuel White of Cowes, and costing £3,791, was funded from the legacy of Dr. Vernon Blunt of Birmingham, and named Mary Ann Blunt (ON 748). In her 19 years at the station, the lifeboat would be launched 20 times, and save nine lives.

Mrs Maire C. Hoy was appointed Honorary Secretary for Clogherhead Lifeboat Station in 1961, following the death of her husband, who had held the position since 1953. She would be the first female to hold this role in the RNLI, and carried out her duties for the next 20 years, until her retirement in December 1981.

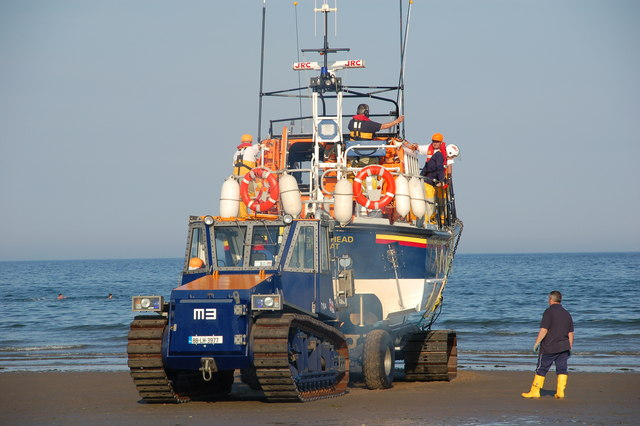
Launching the Clogherhead Mersey-class lifeboat

In 1993, the Mersey-class All-Weather lifeboat (ALB), 12-31 Doris Bleasdale (ON 1190) was assigned to Clogherhead, and the boathouse was rebuilt to accommodate the new boat and tractor.

Clogherhead lifeboat was launched at 20:35 into south-east gale force 7 conditions on 28 November 2000, to the aid of the fishing trawler March Sod, which had lost power, and was drifting in Dundalk Bay. By the time the lifeboat arrived, the trawler had been driven onto the rocks, and holed. With extreme care in the rough conditions, using his local knowledge, the coxswain managed to navigate the rocky shore, and bring the lifeboat alongside. Two lifeboat crew boarded the vessel with a salvage pump, but it was quickly realised that efforts to pump out the water were futile. The vessel was abandoned, and the fishermen landed at Port Oriel at 21:24. By the following morning, the vessel had vanished, destroyed by the sea. For this service, Coxswain Noel Sharkey was accorded 'The Thanks of the Institution inscribed on Vellum', with 'Vellum Service Certificates' awarded to the crew.

On 1 June 2019, Clogherhead lifeboat station welcomed the arrival of a new Shannon-class lifeboat, number 13-31, timed to arrive exactly at 13:31.

At a ceremony on Saturday 31 August 2019, the new €2.5 million lifeboat, funded from the legacy of Wexford farmer Henry Tomkins, was formally named 13-31 Michael O'Brien (ON 1338), after the former Arklow lifeboat coxswain, and friend of Mr Tomkins.

== Station honours ==
The following are awards made at Clogherhead.

- RNIPLS Gold Medal
  Robert Kirkpatrick Thompson, Chief Officer, H.M. Coastguard, Clogher Head – 1839
- RNIPLS Silver Medal
  Thomas Lamb Wood, Chief Officer, H.M.Coastguard, Dunany – 1826
  Robert Kirkpatrick Thompson, Chief Officer, H.M. Coastguard, Clogher Head – 1837
  Addeley Barnard, Chief Officer, H.M. Coastguard, Clogher Head – 1852
  Addeley Barnard, Chief Officer, H.M. Coastguard, Clogher Head – 1852 (Second Service Clasp)
- 'The Thanks of the Institution inscribed on Vellum'
  Noel Sharkey, Coxswain – 2001
- Vellum Service Certificates
  Padraig Rath, Deputy Second Coxswain/Mechanic – 2001
  Barry Faulkner, Second Coxswain – 2001
  Sean Reilly, Second Mechanic – 2001
  Gerald Sharkey, crew member – 2001
  Ronan Faulkner, crew member – 2001
  Lisa Levins, crew member – 2001
  James Byrne, crew member – 2001

== Clogherhead lifeboats ==
=== Pulling and Sailing (P&S) lifeboats ===
ON (Note: ON is the RNLI's Official Number of the boat.)	Name	Built	On station	Class	Comments
428	Charles Whitton	1899	1899–1927	35-foot self-righting (P&S)	(Note: 35 ft 0 in (10.67 m) x 8 ft 6 in (2.59 m) (10-oared) self-righting (P&S) lifeboat, legacy of Mr C. R Whitton of Fawley, built by Hollwey of Windmill Lane, Dublin, and costing £579.); Sold in 1927. Renamed Benaghmore, Maeve and Poolbeg. Last reported semi-derelict at Arklow (2019), maybe broken up (2025).
638	John Dunn	1914	1927–1931	35-foot self-righting (P&S)	(Note: 35 ft 0 in (10.67 m) x 8 ft 3 in (2.51 m) (10-oared) self-righting (P&S) lifeboat, legacy of Miss Jane Dunn of Belfast, built by Thames Ironworks of Blackwall, London, completed by S. E. Saunders of Cowes, costing £1,327 when new.); Previously at Drogheda No.2. Transferred to Kilmore Quay.

=== Motor lifeboats ===
ON	Op. No. (Note: Op. No. is the RNLI's Operational Number of the boat carried on the hull.)	Name	Built	On station	Class	Comments
748	–	Mary Ann Blunt	1931	1931–1950	35-foot 6in self-righting (motor)	
877	–	George and Caroline Erman	1950	1950–1974	Liverpool	
862	–	Thomas Corbett	1948	1974–1981	Liverpool	Previously at Ramsey and Hoylake.
882	–	B. H. M. H	1951	1981–1984	Liverpool	Previously at Minehead.
985	37-18	Valentine Wyndham-Quin	1967	1984–1988	37-foot Oakley	Previously at Clacton-on-Sea.
942	37-01	J. G. Graves of Sheffield	1958	1988–1991	37-foot Oakley	Previously at Scarborough. Returned to the relief fleet, later at Newcastle. On display in the RNLI Heritage Collection at Chatham Historic Dockyard, December 2025.
978	37-11	The Royal Thames	1964	1991–1993	37-foot Oakley	Previously at Caister, Runswick and Pwllheli.
1190	12-31	Doris Bleasdale	1992	1993–2019	Mersey	
1338	13-31	Michael O'Brien	2019	2019–	Shannon	(Note: Built by All-weather Lifeboat Centre (ALC), Poole, Yard No.19. Launched 8 January 2019. Arrived at Clogherhead 13:31 on 1 June 2019. "On station" at 13:31 8 July 2019.)

More post-service details can be found on the respective lifeboat class pages.

=== Launch and recovery tractors ===
Op.No.	Reg.No.	Type	On station	Comments
T16	YW 3377	Clayton	1927–1929	
T23	PP 7515	FWD Co.	1929–1951	
T28	EYT 780	Case L	1951–1955	
T27	DGP 909	Case L	1955–1964	
T49	FGO 975	Case LA	1964–1978	
T57	NYE 351	Fowler Challenger III	1978–1983	
T56	MYR 426	Fowler Challenger III	1983–1988	
T105	E837 XNT	Talus MB-H Crawler	1988–2001	
T104	88-LH-3977	Talus MB-H Crawler	2001–2010	
T97	85-D-8571	Talus MB-H Crawler	2010–2013	
T98	86-D-120010	Talus MB-H Crawler	2013–2019	
SC-T17	HD68 VBJ	SLARS (SC Innovation)	2019–2024	
SC-T25	GX71 CUW	SLARS (SC Innovation)	2024–	

== See also ==
- List of RNLI stations
- List of former RNLI stations
- Royal National Lifeboat Institution lifeboats
