= Drogheda No.2 Lifeboat Station =

Former lifeboat station in County Meath, Ireland

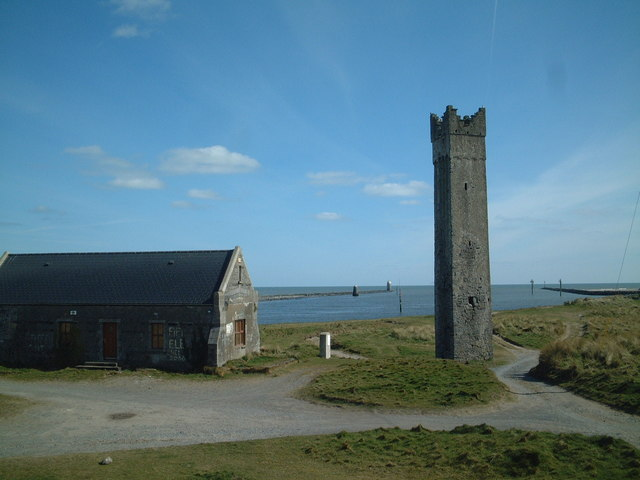
- Drogheda No.2 Lifeboat Station and Maiden Tower

- Location within Ireland
- Alternative names: Drogheda Lifeboat Station

General information
- Status: Closed
- Type: RNLI Lifeboat Station
- Location: The Lifeboat House, Tower Road, Mornington, County Meath, Ireland
- Coordinates: 53°43′22.2″N 6°15′06.4″W
- Opened: 1872
- Closed: 1926

Drogheda No.2 Lifeboat Station was near Mornington, a village on the south side of the River Boyne estuary, near Drogheda in County Meath, Ireland.

A lifeboat station was established at Mornington by the Royal National Lifeboat Institution (RNLI) in 1872. The station would become Drogheda Lifeboat Station following the closure of Drogheda No.1 in 1899.

After 54 years of operation, Drogheda (No.2) Lifeboat Station closed in 1926.

== History ==
On passage from Newport, Monmouthshire to Dublin, the brig Manly was driven onto the sands at Bettystown in a severe gale on 27 September 1871. Six of the crew of the Manly were lost. One person survived.

Following the loss of the Manly, it was decided to open a No.2 station at Drogheda in 1872, located on the south side of the River Boyne at Mornington, County Meath. A boathouse was constructed near to the Maiden's Tower. A 32-foot self-righting 'Pulling and Sailing (P&S) lifeboat, one with both sails and (10) oars, was provided along with a launch carriage, both items being transported from London to Dublin free of charge by the British and Irish Steam Packet Company, arriving in July 1872. The lifeboat was funded from the bequest of English literary, art and music critic, and author Henry Fothergill Chorley, and named after his late brother John Rutter Chorley.

Although the Drogheda No.1 and No.2 stations were in close proximity across the river, each boat could be pulled on its carriage North or South respectively prior to launching, greatly reducing response times to vessels in distress along the coast. To prove the point, the Assistant Inspector of Lifeboats had the No.2 lifeboat quickly conveyed 3 miles south to Bettystown, the location of the Manly wreck.

On 2 February 1873, the John Rutter Chorley was launched to the schooner Wilson of Whitehaven. On passage to Cardiff, the vessel was driven ashore on the North Bull. As the vessel was breaking up, the five crew were rescued.

In some cases, many years could go by without a call for the lifeboat. 1877 would prove to be somewhat different, the Drogheda No.2 lifeboat launching six times, and rescuing 24 people. On 11 January, 11 were rescued from the barque Sisters, on passage to Drogheda from Baltimore in Maryland, driven ashore at Laytown, County Meath. The steamship Urania ran aground on the North Bull just one week later on 18 January 1877. The lifeboat managed to rescue 10 of the 11 crew.

In 1881, the Institution was the recipient of the bequest of £1500-0s-0d from the late Mrs. S. H. Bradshaw, of Reading. The funds were for the provision of three lifeboats:

- Faith (ON 94), Cloughey (1885–1906)
- Hope (ON 82), Castletown (1885–1896)
- Charity (ON 96), Drogheda No.2 (1885–1901)

Three more lifeboats would serve at Mornington station, including the Charles Whitton (ON 334) from 1901 to 1902, when it was transferred from the recently closed Drogheda No.1 station across the River Boyne at Baltray. It took the designation Reserve No.7, as the name, and funding, was transferred to a new boat at Clogherhead. With more powered vessels generally in use, and reducing numbers of sailing vessels, which were at the mercy of the weather, the requirement for the lifeboat station gradually diminished. The lifeboat was only called 12 times between 1885 and 1926. Drogheda No.2 Lifeboat Station was closed in 1926.

The boathouse next to the Maiden Tower still stands, and has recently been restored to be a private dwelling. The last lifeboat at Mornington, John Dunn (ON 638), was transferred to the flanking station at Clogherhead in 1927, and later to Kilmore Quay.

== Drogheda No.2 lifeboats ==
ON (Note: ON is the RNLI's Official Number of the boat.)	Name	Built	On station	Class	Comments
Pre-568	John Rutter Chorley	1872	1872−1885	32-foot Prowse Self-righting (P&S)	(Note: 32-foot x 7-foot 7in (10-oared) Prowse-class self-righting (P&S) lifeboat, legacy of Mr H. F. Chorley of London, built by Woolfe of Shadwell, London, costing £252.)
96	Charity	1884	1885−1901	34-foot Self-righting (P&S)	(Note: 34-foot x 7-foot 6in (10-oared) self-righting (P&S) lifeboat, legacy of Mrs S. H. Bradshaw of Reading, built by Woolfe of Shadwell, London, costing £352.)
334	Reserve No. 7	1892	1901−1902	34-foot Self-righting (P&S)	(Note: 34-foot x 7-foot 6in (10-oared) self-righting (P&S) lifeboat, legacy of Mr C. H. Whitton of Fawley, built by Forrestt of Limehouse, London, costing £437); Previously Charles Whitton at Drogheda No.1
491	Rose Beddington	1902	1902−1914	35-foot Self-righting (P&S)	(Note: 35-foot x 8-foot 3in (10-oared) self-righting (P&S) lifeboat, legacy of Mr H. I. Beddington of London, built by Thames Ironworks of Blackwall, London, costing £838.)
638	John Dunn	1914	1914−1926	35-foot Self-righting (P&S)	(Note: 35-foot x 8-foot 3in (10-oared) self-righting (P&S) lifeboat, legacy of Miss Jane Dunn of Belfast, built by Thames Ironworks of Blackwall, London, completed by S. E. Saunders of Cowes, costing £1,327)

Pre ON numbers are unofficial numbers used by the Lifeboat Enthusiast Society to reference early lifeboats not included on the official RNLI list.

== See also ==
- List of RNLI stations
- List of former RNLI stations
- Royal National Lifeboat Institution lifeboats
