= Drogheda No.1 Lifeboat Station =

Former RNLI lifeboat station in County Louth, Ireland

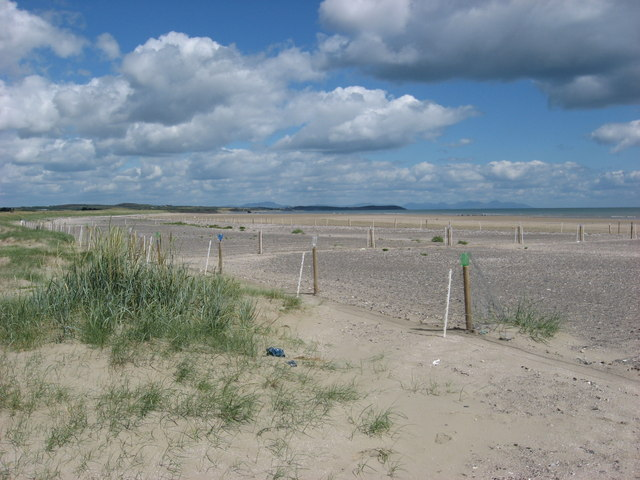
- Baltray, County Louth

- Location of Drogheda No.1 Lifeboat Station, County Louth
- Alternative names: Drogheda Lifeboat Station

General information
- Status: Closed
- Type: RNLI Lifeboat Station
- Location: The Lifeboat House, Shore Road, Baltray, County Louth, Ireland
- Coordinates: 53°43′55.3″N 6°15′44.4″W
- Opened: 1856
- Closed: 1899

Drogheda No.1 Lifeboat Station was located at The Haven, in the village of Baltray, on the north side of the River Boyne, near Drogheda in County Louth, Ireland.

Drogheda Lifeboat Station was first established at Baltray by the Royal National Lifeboat Institution (RNLI) in 1856. From 1872, it was known as Drogheda No.1 Lifeboat Station, following the establishment of a No.2 station across the river at Mornington.

After 44 years of operations, but with only eight calls in its last 20 years, Drogheda No.1 Lifeboat Station closed in 1899. It was replaced by a new station at Clogherhead.

== History ==
Ever since its founding in 1824, the Royal National Institution for the Preservation of Life from Shipwreck (RNIPLS), later to become the RNLI in 1854, would award medals for deeds of gallantry at sea, even if no lifeboats were involved. Robert Kirkpatrick Thompson, Chief Officer of H.M. Coastguard at Clogherhead, received the RNIPLS Gold Medal in 1839, for the rescue of the Master and three crew from the schooner Minerva, wrecked on the North Bar at Drogheda on 31 March 1839.

The first Drogheda lifeboat was a 30-foot self-righting 'Pulling and Sailing' (P&S) lifeboat, one with both oars and sail, of 'Mr. Peake's design', built by Forrestt of Limehouse, London, at a cost of £155. A carriage was supplied from Ransomes & Sons of Ipswich, and a boathouse was constructed at Baltray, near the mouth of the River Boyne, by the Drogheda Harbour Commissioners. Both lifeboat and carriage were transport to Drogheda free of charge by the British and Irish Steam Packet Company. The station opened in 1856. John McNamara was appointed Honorary Secretary.

On 7 February 1862, the No.1 lifeboat was launched to the aid of the brig Minerva on Workington, aground on the South Bull. Holed and taking on water, the crew of five and the Captain were rescued.

A 28-foot lifeboat was placed at Baltray in 1862. It was named Rescue, and had served at St Sampson in Guernsey from 1857. It would be launched to the aid of the schooner Mary Anne, driven ashore on 2 February 1863, and rescued the crew of five.

In 1867, funds were appropriated from the legacy of Miss Maria Irlam of Dibbinsdale, Bromborough, and the lifeboat was renamed Old George Irlam of Liverpool. Two later lifeboats also carried the name Old George Irlam of Liverpool.

On passage from Newport, Monmouthshire to Dublin, the brig Manly was driven onto the sands in a severe gale on 27 September 1871. Old George Irlam of Liverpool was launched, but could not reach the vessel in the conditions. Six of the crew of the Manly were lost. One person survived. He had been washed away from the vessel, but had held onto a lifebuoy, and was rescued from the heavy surf by Miss Jane Campbell, assisted by a Mrs Fox. Jane Campbell was awarded the RNLI Silver Medal, with Mrs Fox receiving 'The Thanks of the Institution inscribed on Vellum'.

Following the loss of the Manly, it was decided to open a No.2 station at Drogheda in 1872, located on the south side of the River Boyne at Mornington, County Meath.

On 25 September 1876, Old George Irlam of Liverpool was launched to the aid of the brigantine Maxim, on passage from Liverpool to Saint John's, Newfoundland. Driven ashore 2 miles (3.2 km) north of the River Boyne bar, the eight crewmen were rescued.

Between 1879 and 1899, the No.1 lifeboat was launched only eight times, with no lives saved. In 1899, it was decided to close one of the stations on the River Boyne, and place a lifeboat further up the coast at Clogherhead, a fishing port, with no shortage of crew. Drogheda No.2 station remained in service (until 1926), as Drogheda Lifeboat Station, and the Drogheda No.1 station at Baltray was closed.

The lifeboat on station at the time, Charles Whitton (ON 334), had been funded by the legacy of £1,898-14s-8d from the late Charles R. Whitton of Wimbledon, London. Charles Whitton (ON 334) was transferred to serve at Mornington from 1901 to 1902, although taking the designation Reserve No.7, as the funding from Charles Whittons legacy, and the name, transferred to a new boat for Clogherhead. The boat would later serve at Port Isaac as the Richard and Sarah from 1905 to 1927. The station building was handed over to Drogheda Corporation for temporary use as an Isolation hospital in 1900. All that remains today is evidence of the launchway.

== Station honours ==
The following are awards made at Drogheda.

- RNIPLS Gold Medal

Robert Kirkpatrick Thompson, Chief Officer of coastguard – 1839

- RNLI Silver Medal

Miss Jane Campbell – 1871

- The Thanks of the Institution inscribed on Vellum

Mrs Fox – 1871

== Drogheda No.1 lifeboats ==
| ON (Note: ON is the RNLI's Official Number of the boat.) | Name | Built | On station | Class | Comments |
|---|---|---|---|---|---|
| Pre-301 | Unnamed | 1856 | 1856−1862 | 30-foot Peake Self-righting (P&S) | (Note: 30-foot x 7-foot 6in (10-oared) self-righting (P&S) lifeboat, built by Forrestt of Limehouse, London, costing £156.) |
| Pre-317 | Old George Irlam of Liverpool | 1857 | 1862−1869 | 28-foot Peake Self-righting (P&S) | (Note: 28-foot x 6-foot 1in (6-oared) self-righting (P&S) lifeboat, legacy of Miss M. Irlam of Liverpool, built by Forrestt of Limehouse, London, costing £136 when new.); Previously Rescue at St Sampson, Guernsey. |
| Pre-534 | Old George Irlam of Liverpool | 1869 | 1869−1879 | 32-foot Prowse Self-righting (P&S) | (Note: 32-foot x 7-foot 6in (10-oared) Prowse-class self-righting (P&S) lifeboat, legacy of Miss M. Irlam of Liverpool, built by Forrestt of Limehouse, London, costing £246) |
| 294 | Old George Irlam of Liverpool | 1879 | 1879−1892 | 34-foot Self-righting (P&S) | (Note: 34-foot x 7-foot 6in (10-oared) self-righting (P&S) lifeboat, legacy of Miss M. Irlam of Bromborough, built by Woolfe of Shadwell, Liverpool, costing £363) |
| 334 | Charles Whitton | 1892 | 1892−1899 | 34-foot Self-righting (P&S) | (Note: 34-foot x 7-foot 6in (10-oared) self-righting (P&S) lifeboat, legacy of Mr C. H. Whitton of Fawley, built by Forrestt of Limehouse, London, costing £437) |

Station Closed, 1899

Pre ON numbers are unofficial numbers used by the Lifeboat Enthusiast Society to reference early lifeboats not included on the official RNLI list.

== See also ==
- List of RNLI stations
- List of former RNLI stations
- Royal National Lifeboat Institution lifeboats
