= Holmwood (disambiguation) =

Holmwood is a civil parish in Surrey, England.

Holmwood may also refer to:

- Holmwood, Redditch, a large house built by Temple Lushington Moore
- Holmwood, Western Australia
- Holmwood Estate, a tea estate in Sri Lanka
- Holmwood railway station, Surrey, England
- Holmwood House, Glasgow, an elaborate villa designed by Scottish architect Alexander "Greek" Thomson
- North Holmwood, Surrey, England
- South Holmwood, Surrey, England

== See also ==
- Holmewood, a village in Derbyshire, England
