= Warnham =

Village and parish in West Sussex, England

Coordinates: 51.09144°N 0.34659°W

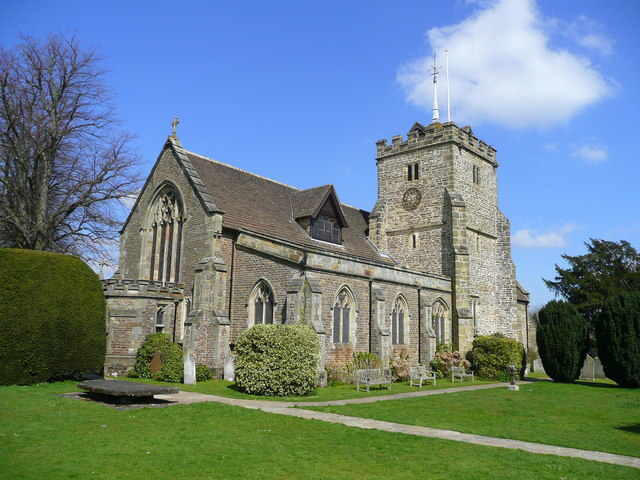
- St Margaret's Church; Grade I listed

- Location within West Sussex
- Area: 19.80 km^{2} (7.64 sq mi)
- Population: 1,958 2001 Census; 2,068 (2011 Census)
  - Density: 99/km^{2} (260/sq mi)
- OS grid reference: TQ158337
  - London: 30 miles (48 km) NNE
- Civil parish: Warnham
- District: Horsham
- Shire county: West Sussex
- Region: South East
- Country: England
- Sovereign state: United Kingdom
- Post town: HORSHAM
- Postcode district: RH12
- Dialling code: 01403
- Police: Sussex
- Fire: West Sussex
- Ambulance: South East Coast
- UK Parliament: Horsham
- Website: http://www.warnham.info/

Warnham is a village and civil parish in the Horsham district of West Sussex, England. The village is centred 2 miles (3.2 km) north-northwest of Horsham, 31 miles (50 km) from London, to the west of the A24 road. The parish is in the north-west of the Weald.

== History ==
The Anglican parish church, dedicated to St Margaret was built in the 14th century, but contains later additions. St Margaret's contains monuments belonging to at least three influential families: the Durford, the Lucas and the Shelley family.

== Geography ==
Named settlements within the parish include the hamlets of Goosegreen, Kingsfold and Winterfold as well as parts of Strood Green and Rowhook. The area is in the north-west of the Weald, a sloped remnant forest in south-east England and largely a plain by erosion.

The parish land area is 1980 hectares (4892 acres). In the 2001 census 1958 people lived in 784 households, of whom 935 were economically active. At the 2011 Census the population was 2,068.

=== Warnham Court ===
Formerly Hollands Manor, Warnham Court built in ashlar was built for Henry Tredcroft in 1828. Warnham Court School until August 1996 occupied the building, set in the listed Warnham Park immediately southeast of the village, with extensions and outbuildings by architect Arthur William Blomfield and his son Sir Arthur Blomfield. (Note: The next nearest listed garden is Sedgwick Park containing the remains of Sedgwick Castle 4 miles (6.4 km) south)

The park grounds were laid out from the early 1830s, developed in the mid- and late 19th century by the landscape designer Henry, (Note: for Sir John Henry Pelly) and later with a pinetum by Harry J. Veitch. Extended with a wild garden in the early 20th century, the gardens are surrounded by a 19th-century park.

=== Field Place ===
The early 19th-century poet and Romanticist Percy Bysshe Shelley, husband of Mary Shelley was born at Grade I listed Field Place, a broad-fronted country house set on an estate/working farm, and was baptised there in 1792. A cousin was Thomas Medwin.

=== Kingsfold ===
Kingsfold is the northern settlement on the A24 and Marches Road 2.8 miles (4.5 km) north of Horsham. The village lies close to the Surrey border just south of site of the medieval Shiremark Mill, also known as Capel Mill and Kingsfold Mill which is 20 metres north of the border in Capel. The village has one pub, The Owl.

A tune entitled 'Kingsfold' was adapted from a folk song by Ralph Vaughan Williams for the hymn 'I heard the voice of Jesus say' by Horatius Bonar.

=== Goosegreen or Goose Green ===
Goosegreen consists of a small group of farms and cottages between Warnham and Broadbridge Heath and includes four Grade II listed buildings. (Note: Goosegreen (building), Bailing Hill Farmhouse, Barn just east of Goosegreen (property) and Goosegreen Cottages) To the south of the hamlet is a cricket ground, home to the Broadbridge Heath Cricket Club, and tennis courts. Most of the houses are owned or were formerly owned by the Warnham Park Estate, whose offices are at Bailing Hill Farm. The artist Joan Eardley was born at Bailing Hill Farm on 18 May 1921; the family moved to Blackheath in 1926 and then to Scotland in 1939, where she was active for the remainder of her career.

=== Rowhook ===
Rowhook is a hamlet on the Broadbridge Heath to Ewhurst, Surrey road 3 miles (5 km) northwest of Horsham. Rowhook lies on a junction of two Roman roads, one being Stane Street (Chichester), the other an unnamed road which runs to the top of "Hurtwood" on the Greensand Ridge in Ewhurst.

From the junction of the A29 and the A281 to the south, (Note: known locally as "Roman Gate") the course of Stane Street passes through Waterland Farm, becomes a lane which joins the Rowhook Road next to the Chequers Inn, a Grade II listed building, (Note: The Chequers Inn) and continues in a northeasterly direction towards Ockley in Surrey, where it once again joins the A29.

While divided by the parish boundaries of Warnham, Slinfold and Rudgwick, the majority of the hamlet and in particular, Rowhook Manor, which is a Grade II listed building of early medieval origin, is in Warnham civil parish.

== Community ==
Warnham village shops include a village store and butcher, two pubs The Sussex Oak and The Greets Inn, a primary school and Warnham railway station lies nearly a mile away from the village, on the Sutton & Mole Valley Lines. The station was built primarily for the brick works, which had some sidings until recently; it provides an hourly service to London Victoria with connections to London Waterloo. The adjacent level crossing is now permanently closed except for pedestrians and cyclists.

Gallery

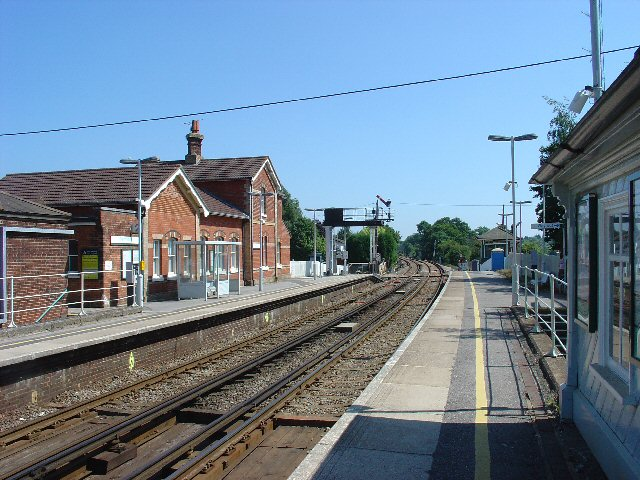
Warnham Railway Station

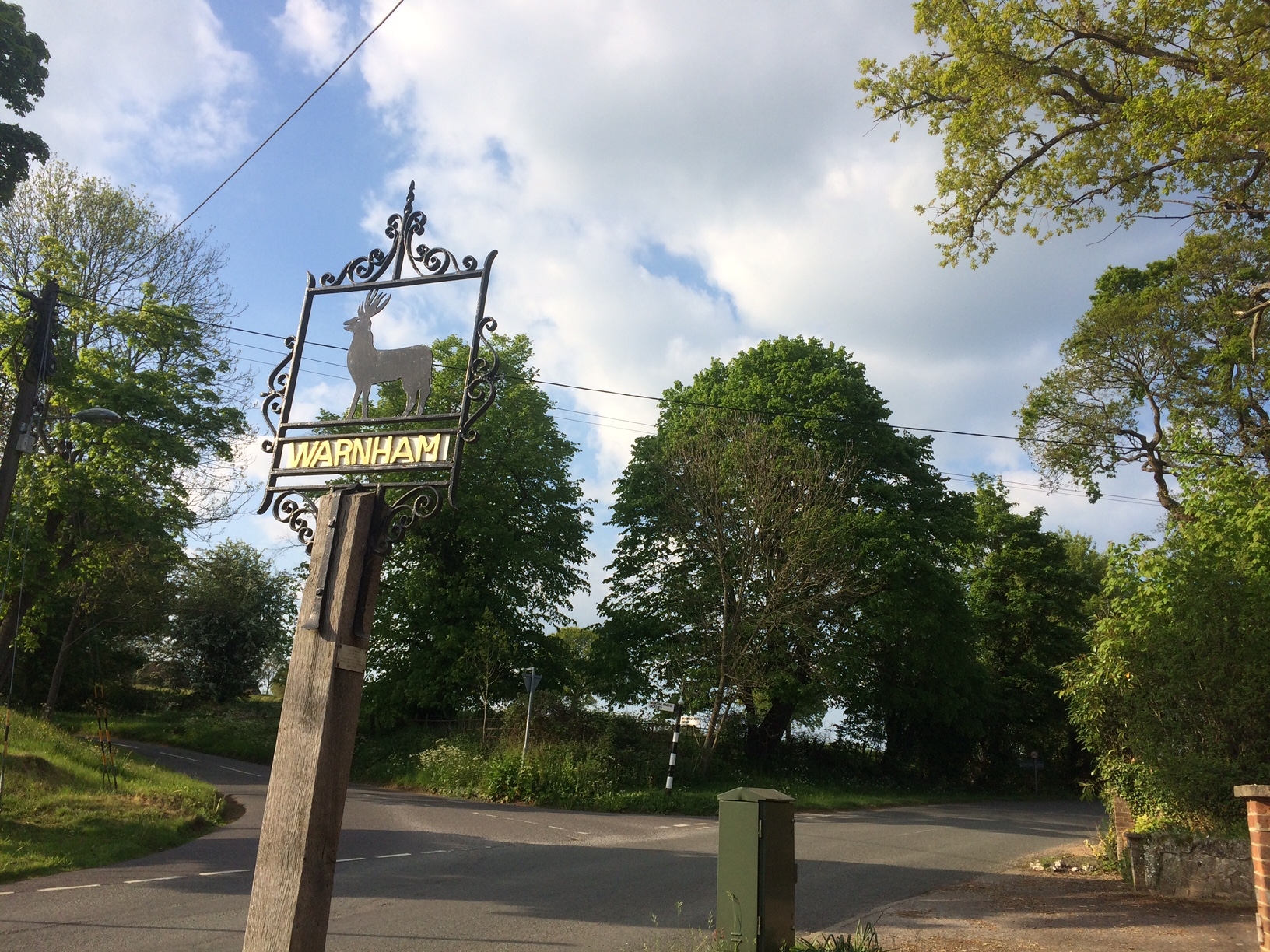
Warnham Welcome Sign

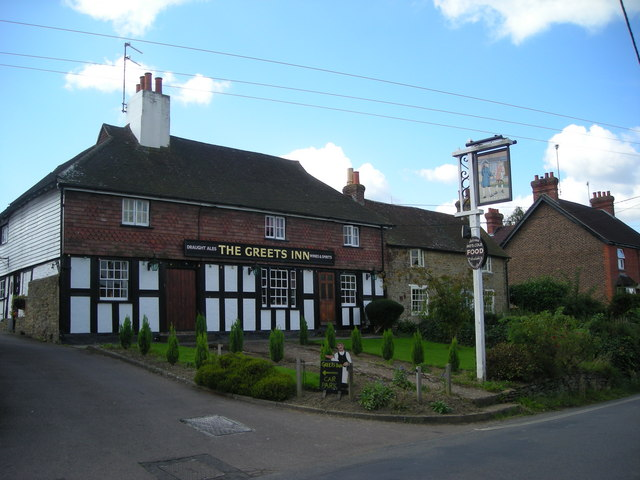
The Greets Inn

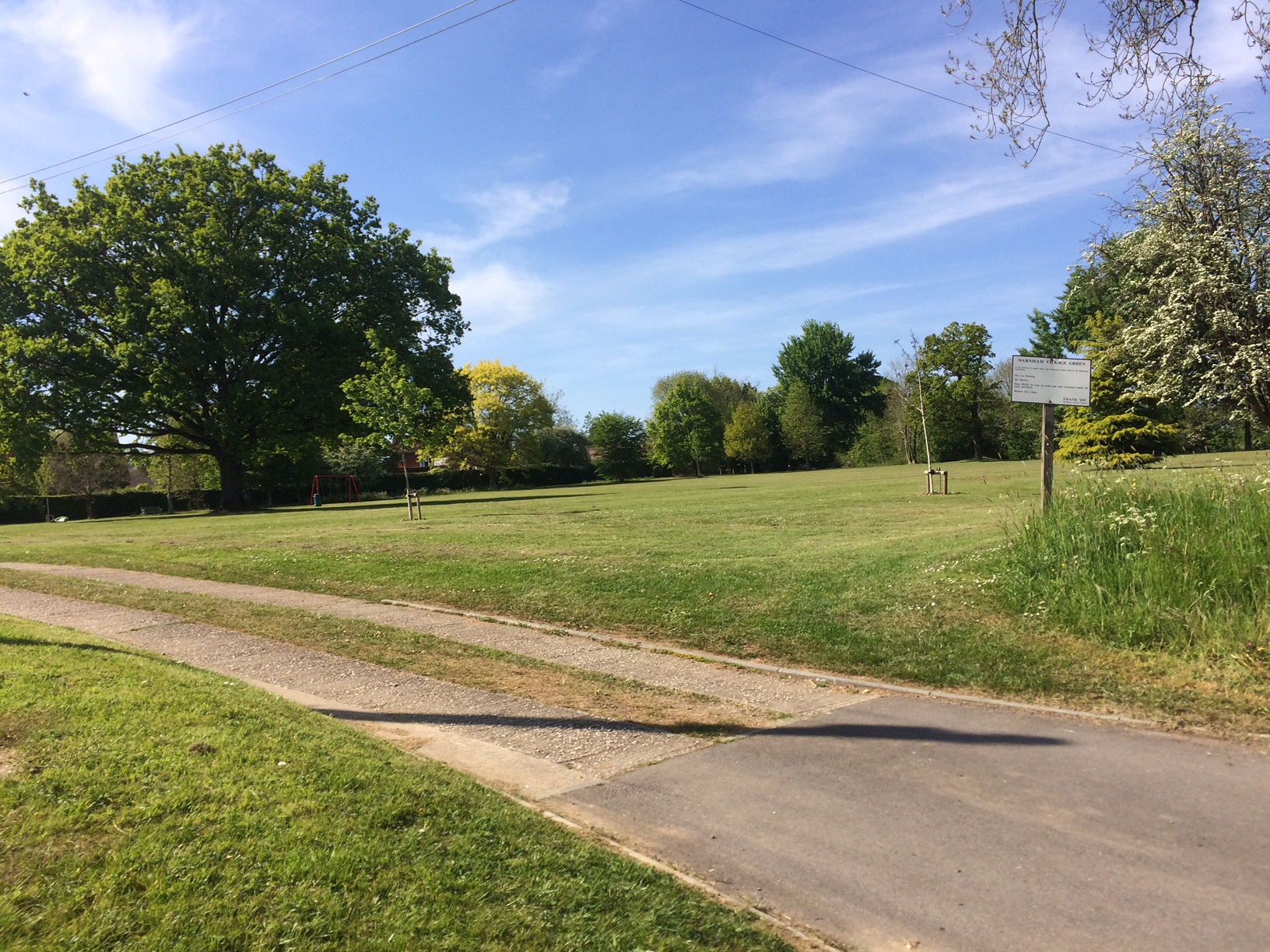
Warnham Village Green

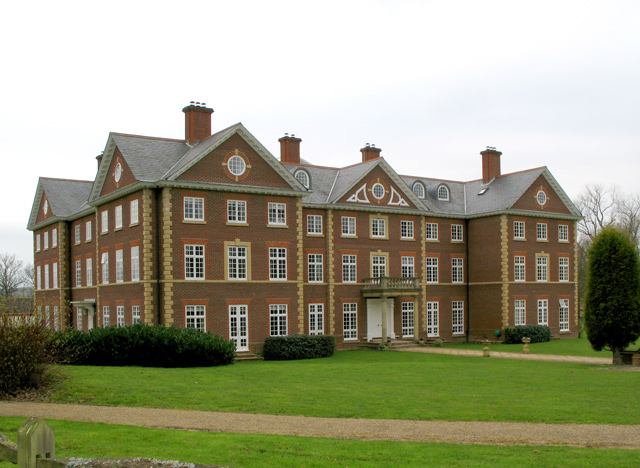
Warnham Manor

== Notes and references ==
notes
