= A24 road (England) =

Major road in southern England

A24

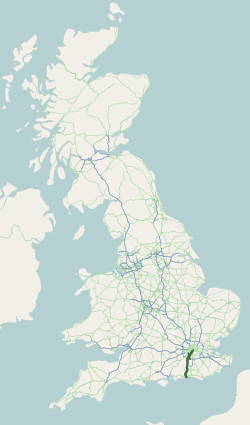

Route information
- Length: 53.2 mi (85.6 km)

Major junctions
- North end: A3 in Clapham; 51.4608°N 0.1395°W
- A205 in Clapham A217 in Morden A240 in Ewell A243 near Leatherhead A264 near Horsham A272 near West Grinstead A283 near Washington A27 in Worthing

- South end: A259 in Worthing50.8157°N 0.3716°W

Location
- Country: United Kingdom
- Constituent country: England
- Counties: Greater London, Surrey, West Sussex
- Primary destinations: Sutton; Dorking; Horsham; Worthing

Road network
- Roads in the United Kingdom; Motorways; A and B road zones
← A23	→ A25

The A24 is a major road in England that runs for 53.2 miles (85.6 km) from Clapham in south-west London to Worthing on the English Channel in West Sussex via the suburbs of south-west London, as well as through the counties of Surrey and West Sussex.

== Route ==
Between Clapham and Dorking, the A24 closely follows the route of the old Roman road Stane Street. The Morden branch of the Northern line runs under the road from Clapham via Colliers Wood to Morden. Cycle Superhighway 7 also runs along the road from Clapham to Colliers Wood.

=== Greater London ===
==== Lambeth & Wandsworth ====
The A24 starts at a junction with the A3 at the northeastern corner of Clapham Common, near Clapham Common tube station in the London Borough of Lambeth. South of Clapham Common station, the London Underground Northern line runs beneath the A24, following its route southbound. The A24 runs along the eastern perimeter of the Common, before meeting the South Circular near Clapham South tube station. Along this stretch of road, Cycle Superhighway 7 (CS7), which begins in the City of London, leaves the A3/Clapham High Street and follows the route of the A24. CS7 is marked by blue paint on either side of the road.

Passing Clapham South, the A24 and CS7 enter the London Borough of Wandsworth. The routes are carried by Balham Hill, before becoming Balham High Road as they pass Balham station. Leaving Balham to the south, the A24 and CS7 arrive at Tooting Bec station at a junction with the A214.

Beyond Tooting Bec, the road is named Upper Tooting Road, before it becomes Tooting High Street as it passes Tooting Broadway station. At the station, the A24 and CS7 meet the A217/Garratt Lane. St George's Hospital is situated to the northwest of the A24, west of Tooting Broadway station. The routes leave the London Borough of Wandsworth, and Inner London, a short distance to the south of Tooting.

==== Merton ====
The A24 and CS7 enter the London Borough of Merton as they cross via a railway bridge over the Sutton Loop Line, between Haydons Road and Tooting stations. The routes are carried by High Street Colliers Wood. The routes meet Colliers Wood tube station, where CS7 finishes. The A24 then meets the A238/Merton High Street, at which point the route turns left to become Christchurch Road. The Northern line also no longer follows the route of the A24 at this point, instead following that of the A238 towards South Wimbledon.

At a crossroads in Merton, Christchurch Road continues southwards as the A236 (towards Mitcham). The A24 turns right onto Merantun Way, crossing the River Wandle as it leaves Colliers Wood and Merton.

The road turns left onto Morden Road at a junction with the A219. It passes Morden Industrial Area, Morden Hall Park and the A297 before reaching Morden Underground station. As London Road it passes under the railway bridge by Morden South railway station. It passes the junction with the A239 Central Road next to Morden Park before becoming Epsom Road. The road runs through Lower Morden for a short distance and passes by Morden Cricket Club before exiting the borough.

==== Sutton ====
The road enters the North Cheam area of the London Borough of Sutton just before it reaches the Woodstock junction with the B279. It passes the Sutton Common area to the east and runs down the steep Stonecot Hill before it changes name to London Road. It passes St Anthony's Hospital on the way into North Cheam before reaching the Queen Victoria crossroads with the A2043. The road then leaves the shopping environment and the area becomes more residential as it continues as London Road before exiting the borough and Greater London.

=== Surrey ===
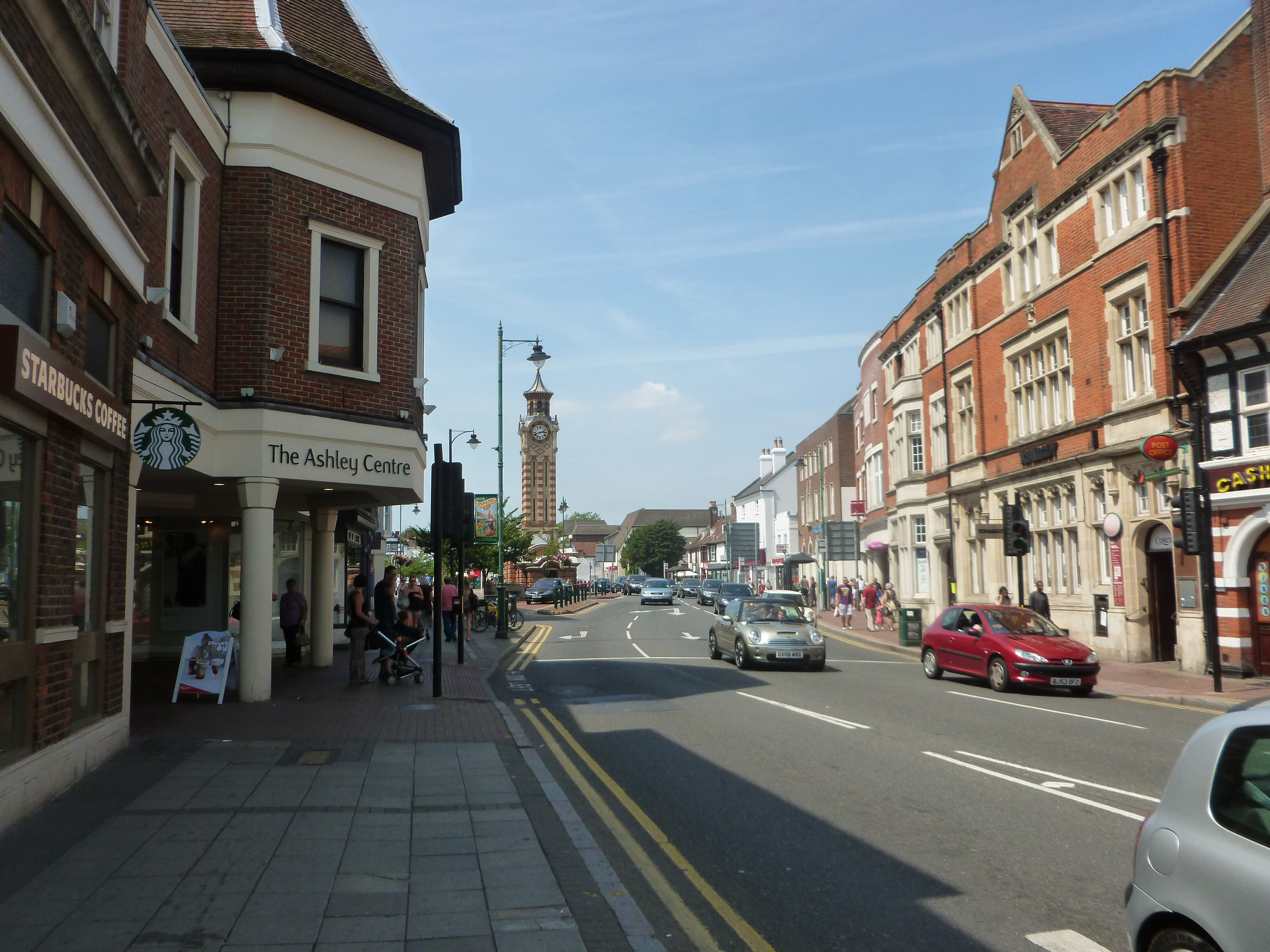
Epsom High street with the Ashley Centre and Epsom Clock Tower

==== Epsom and Ewell ====
The A24 continues as London Road, entering the borough of Epsom and Ewell in Surrey by Sparrow Farm Road in Stoneleigh. At this point, the speed limit increases to 40 mph and the road subsequently runs alongside Nonsuch Park. Two out of the three car parks for Nonsuch are on the road. The speed limit returns to 30 mph before reaching the Organ Crossroads, Ewell with the A240 and the B2200. The road becomes the Ewell By-Pass (40 mph limit). It passes a crossroads with the Ewell terminus of the A232 and the B2200 before running past the North East Surrey College of Technology, then approaches a roundabout with Reigate Road and the A240.

It heads towards Epsom and becomes Epsom Road, then East Street and passes Kiln Lane, an industrial area with a large Sainsbury's and various other shops. It also passes the Rainbow Leisure Centre as it heads into Epsom Town Centre. It passes a set of traffic lights by Hook Road immediately before it becomes Epsom High Street and goes around the one-way system by the Ashley Centre, Epsom Clock Tower and Epsom Playhouse before becoming South Street and Dorking Road. It passes Epsom General Hospital before beginning its long rural stretch to the south coast, first passing The Wells and Epsom Common before leaving the borough on a bridge over the Rye brook, a tributary of the River Mole.

==== Mole Valley ====
The road enters Ashtead, a large village in the Mole Valley District, and becomes Epsom Road. It passes Ashtead Common and Ashtead Park before changing name to The Street in the centre of Ashtead (its High Street). Once the road leaves the centre of Ashtead it becomes Leatherhead Road and passes Ashtead Hospital. It then enters Leatherhead and crosses the M25 just before the road turns left at the Knoll Roundabout. This is where the A243 starts and it is the way to Junction 9 of the M25, while the B2122 heads into Leatherhead town centre. The A24 becomes Bypass Road (Leatherhead) and the speed limit goes up from 40 mph (64 km/h) to 50 mph (80 km/h) as the road enters a more rural area.

It passes the B2033 (Reigate Road) at the Beaverbrook roundabout and continues for 0.6 miles (1 km) before turning left at the Givons Grove roundabout with the A246 and the B2450. It becomes Dorking Road, then the Mickleham By-pass and becomes a dual-carriageway. It passes the B2209 (Old London Road), the main road in Mickleham, a small village near Box Hill. The A24 runs next to Box Hill, passes two car parks and crosses the Burford Bridge over the River Mole. It then heads into the town of Dorking, passes the B2038 (Pixham Lane) and the A2003 (Ashcombe Road) near Dorking railway station. Just afterwards, the road passes near to Dorking (Deepdene) railway station, becomes Deepdene Avenue and runs on to the Deepdene Roundabout with the A25.

It exits central Dorking and becomes a lot less urban, entering North Holmwood just before another roundabout with the A2003 (Flint Hill) and Spook Hill. It continues south and passes the small villages of Mid Holmwood and South Holmwood, as well as Holmwood railway station, just before the northern end of the A29 and Newdigate Road. It changes name to Capel By-pass and passes near to the B2126 and Ockley railway station before it passes Capel village itself, which is 6 miles (9.7 km) south of Dorking. It passes Clark's Green roundabout, which includes what becomes the main road in Capel. It runs south for another 2 miles (3.2 km) before exiting Surrey.

=== West Sussex ===
The A24 enters West Sussex before passing the small village of Kingsfold. Two miles further along, the road skirts the much larger village of Warnham. The road continues past a roundabout with the A264 where it turns right to form part of the Horsham by-pass. The dual carriageway continues past Southwater, the crossroads junction with the A272, Ashington, Washington and Findon before terminating in the seaside resort of Worthing at the A259 in the town centre.

== Landmarks on the route ==
- Clapham Common
- River Wandle
- Morden Civic Centre
- Baitul Futuh Mosque
- St Anthony's Hospital
- Nonsuch Park, site of the former Nonsuch Palace
- Epsom Hospital
- Epsom Common
- Ashtead Hospital
- River Mole
- Box Hill
- Denbies Vineyard, Dorking
- Chanctonbury Ring
- Cissbury Ring
