= Listed buildings in Ringwould with Kingsdown =

Historic structures in Kent, England

Ringwould with Kingsdown is a village and civil parish in the Dover District of Kent, England. It contains 15 listed buildings that are recorded in the National Heritage List for England. Of these one is grade I and 14 are grade II.

This list is based on the information retrieved online from Historic England.

== Key ==
Grade	Criteria
I	Buildings that are of exceptional interest
II*	Particularly important buildings of more than special interest
II	Buildings that are of special interest

== Listing ==
Name	Grade	Location	Type	Completed (Note: The date given is the date used by Historic England as significant for the initial building or that of an important part in the structure's description.)	Date designated	Grid ref. (Note: The grid reference is based on the British national grid reference system, sometimes known as OSGB36, used by the Ordnance Survey.) Geo-coordinates	Notes	Entry number (Note: The "List Entry Number" is a unique number assigned to each listed building and scheduled monument by Historic England.)	Image	Wikidata
Home Farmhouse and Wall	II	Back Street			23 April 1987	TR3583848231; 51°11′05″N 1°22′24″E		1348529	Upload Photo	Q26631903
Headstone to Mary and John Clayson, About 5 Metres North of Church of St Nicholas	II	Church Lane			23 April 1987	TR3598148326; 51°11′08″N 1°22′32″E		1070062	Upload Photo	Q26323596
Chest Tomb About 10 Metres South of Church of St Nicholas	II	Church Lane			23 April 1987	TR3598348294; 51°11′06″N 1°22′32″E		1363361	Upload Photo	Q26645192
Chest Tomb and Vault and Headstone About 2 Metres South of Church of St Nicholas	II	Church Lane			23 April 1987	TR3598248302; 51°11′07″N 1°22′32″E		1100255	Upload Photo	Q26392342
Church of St Nicholas	I	Church Lane	church building		22 August 1966	TR3597448303; 51°11′07″N 1°22′31″E		1070060	Church of St Nicholas More images	Q17529712
Group of 7 Headstones to Taylor Family About 5 Metres East of Church of St Nicholas	II	Church Lane			23 April 1987	TR3599148319; 51°11′07″N 1°22′32″E		1348373	Upload Photo	Q26631761
Headstone About 6 Metres South of Chancel of Church of St Nicholas	II	Church Lane			23 April 1987	TR3598348298; 51°11′07″N 1°22′32″E		1348346	Upload Photo	Q26631736
Ringwould House	II	Church Lane			25 July 1980	TR3590548405; 51°11′10″N 1°22′28″E		1070059	Upload Photo	Q26323592
Row of 4 Headstones About 5-10 Metres North West of Church of St Nicholas	II	Church Lane			23 April 1987	TR3595948324; 51°11′07″N 1°22′30″E		1363362	Upload Photo	Q26645193
Two Headstones About 2 Metres South of Church of St Nicholas	II	Church Lane			23 April 1987	TR3598848304; 51°11′07″N 1°22′32″E		1070061	Upload Photo	Q26323594
Wall and Gateway About 50 Metres South West of Ringwould House	II	Church Lane			23 April 1987	TR3594248330; 51°11′08″N 1°22′30″E		1100266	Upload Photo	Q26392353
Chain Cottages	II	1 and 2, Front Street			23 April 1987	TR3594048260; 51°11′05″N 1°22′29″E		1347903	Upload Photo	Q26631324
The Old Bakehouse	II	Front Street			23 April 1987	TR3590948264; 51°11′06″N 1°22′28″E		1070063	Upload Photo	Q26323598
Laundry Cottage	II	Hangmans Lane			23 April 1987	TR3575648280; 51°11′06″N 1°22′20″E		1347891	Upload Photo	Q26631313
Deal House	II	Upper Street, Kingsdown			22 August 1966	TR3780048424; 51°11′08″N 1°24′05″E		1070064	Upload Photo	Q26323600

== See also ==
- Grade I listed buildings in Kent
- Grade II* listed buildings in Kent

== Sources ==
- Newman, John (2013) [1969], Kent: North-East and East, The Buildings of England, New Haven and London: Yale University Press, ISBN 978-0-300-18506-5
