= Ripple Mill, Ringwould =

Smock mill in Ringwould, Kent, England

Ripple Windmill
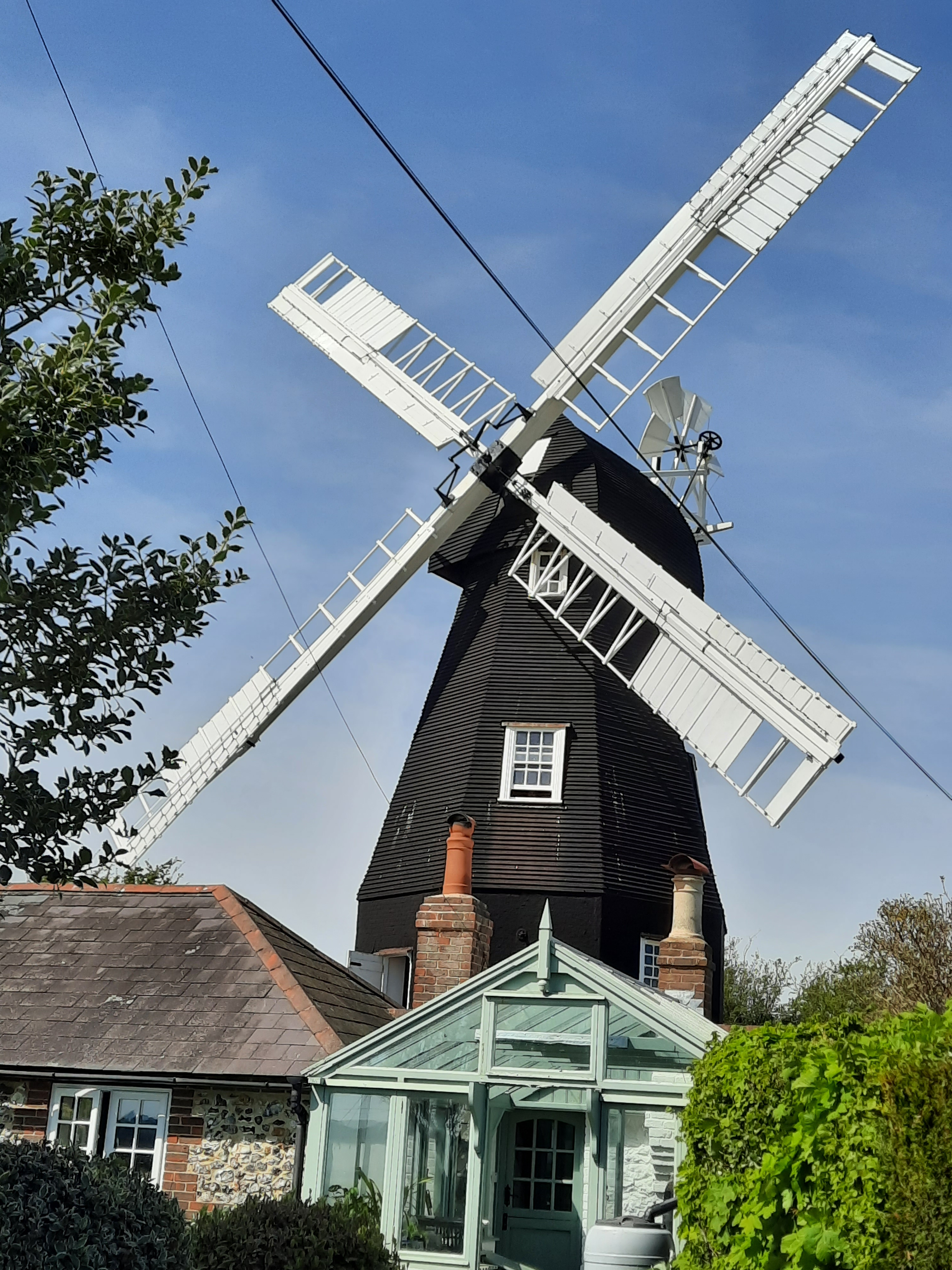
- Ripple Mill, April 2022
- Interactive map of Ripple Windmill

Origin
- Grid reference: TR 362 491
- Coordinates: 51°11′30.5″N 1°22′43″E
- Year built: Early nineteenth century

Information
- Purpose: Corn mill
- Type: Smock mill
- Storeys: Two-storey smock
- Base storeys: Two-storey base
- Smock sides: Eight-sided
- No. of sails: Four
- Type of sails: Single Patent sails
- Windshaft: cast iron
- Winding: Fantail
- Fantail blades: Six blades
- Other information: Restored mill has the windshaft from Shiremark Mill, Capel fitted.

Ripple Windmill is a Grade II listed smock mill in Ringwould, Kent, England, that was built in Drellingore and moved to Ringwould in the early nineteenth century. Having been stripped of machinery and used as a television mast, it has been restored as a working windmill.

== Description ==
Ripple Mill is a two-storey smock mill on a two-storey brick base. There is no stage. It has four single patent sails and a Kentish-style cap. The mill is winded by a fantail. The mill has three pairs of millstones, driven underdrift.

== History ==
A windmill was marked on Robert Morden's map of 1695, a coastal map of Kent dated 1770 and the 1819-43 Ordnance Survey map. Ripple mill was built in the early nineteenth century at Drellingore, in the Hawkinge parish. When the mill was moved, it was sectioned by cutting the cant posts in half lengthways, and bolting them back together at the new site. One such cant post can still be seen in the mill. A girl was killed by being struck by one of the sails, which came close to the ground, circa 1834. In 1895, Trinity House contributed towards repairs to the mill, which was marked as a navigational landmark. The mill lost two sails in 1927 and worked after that on the other two sails, assisted by an oil engine. The mill was working during the Second World War but in 1947 the Society for the Protection of Ancient Buildings decided not to issue an appeal to restore the mill due to a lack of local support. In 1955, the mill was acquired by Rediffusion Ltd and stripped of machinery. The smock was festooned with aerials and used as a television relay station. Rediffusion sold the mill in 1976. The new cap was placed on the mill in 1994, with the windshaft from Shiremark Mill, Capel, Surrey.

== Millers ==
- John Mummery 1833–1849
- Henry Mummery 1845–1852
- William Mummery
- W Davison 1862
- Edwin Pope 1878
- John Banks
- George Simpson
- John E Monins (died during WW2)

References for above:-
