= Holmwood Estate =

Holywood Estate ஹோம்வூட் தோட்டம்
- Tea Processing Centre (not in operation)

- Location within Sri Lanka
- Coordinates: 6°51′05″N 80°42′46″E
- province: Sri Lanka
- Province: Central
- Time zone: UTC+5:30 (Sri Lanka Standard Time Zone)
  - Summer (DST): UTC+6 (Summer time)

Holmwood Estate (Tamil: ஹோம்வூட் தோட்டம்) is a tea estate in the Agrapatana region in Nuwara Eliya District, Central Province of Sri Lanka. The estate was established by Henry St. George Caulfield in 1878 and was named after Holmwood, a parish in Surrey, England. It comprises two Divisions: Holmwood and Sutton Divisions. Holmwood Division is the major division with a larger population. The Estate has about 392 workers.

== Geography ==
The total extent of the estate is 255.44 ha (631.2 acres) of which 198.88 ha (491.4 acres) are planted with tea. Most of the remaining area utilized for settlements called 'line rooms', typical residences built by British during colonial periods. The Estate shares a breezing climate due to the adjoining Agra-Bopath forest reserve, which is an evergreen forest in Nuwara Eliya District, which is connected to Horton Plains National Park on the East.

== History ==
Holmwood Estate was established and governed by the British, between 1824 - 1957. It has a history of almost 139 years since 1880. Many British managers have managed the estate as given in the table below;

Name	Period	Position Held
Waldock, H. R	1925–1925	Asst. Manager
Mayow, C W	1920–1921	Asst. Manager
Wilkinson, D. A.	1917–1930	Manager
Wilkinson, J. A.	1914 – 1914	Manager
Gray, O.W	1909 – 1909	Manager
Bosanquet & co, L.	1905–1906	Manager
Bosanquet, W. D.	1898–1906	Manager
Silva, R. D. C. de	1891–1980	Asst. Manager
Dias, W. C.	1891–1892	Asst. Manager
Hilyer, D.	1891–1892	Asst. Manager
Elder, R.	1890–1891	Asst. Manager
Laurie, Buxton	1890–1891	Manager
Patterson, J. W.	1888–1987	Asst. Manager
Patterson, T.	1885–1892	Asst. Manager
Wickham, R.W.	1880–1892	Manager
Tynte, F.K.	1880 – 1880	Asst. Manager

== Economy ==
The estate mainly produces tea along with other minor agricultural products, mostly highland vegetables, including leek, potato, carrot and beetroot.

The estate is managed by Agrapatana Plantations Limited, a Public Company with Limited Liability in Sri Lanka. During 2006–2007, the estate produced 231,000 kg (509,000 lb) of tea, with a yield of 1,160 kg per ha.

== Demographics ==
The residents of the estate share the cultural traditions of Indian Tamils of Sri Lanka. A small number of inhabitants are Sinhalese. Inhabitants follow Hinduism, Christianity or Buddhism. Hinduism (Shaivism) (Tamil: சைவ சமயம்) is the main religion, followed by more than 70% of the residents.

Inhabitants are a mixture of Tamil and Sinhalese. Indian-origin Tamils are the major ethnic group.

== Festivals ==
Although the Tamils follow Shaivism, they worship the Mariamman deity as well. Each family has its ancestral deities. However, Māri (Tamil: மாரி), Tulu(Mari), also known as Mariamman (Tamil: மாரியம்மன் and Mariaai (Marathi: मरी आई), both meaning "Mother Mari", also spelt Maariamma (Tamil: மாரியம்மா), or simply Amman or 'n' Atha (Tamil: அம்மன், "mother") is worshiped by many as part of common festivals. Residents of the Holmwood Estate practice few unique festival rituals.

== Attractions ==
=== Ramar Malai ===
Ramar Malai (Tamil: (இராமர் மலை) a mountain with a temple of Rama at the peak which is situated on the borders of Agra-Bopath Forest reserve. Agrapatana-Bopathalawa Forest Reserve got caught on fire during May 2016. This mountain is regarded as the most interesting place for the people in Agrapatana, Dayagama and Glenlyon. People, mostly Tamils, from all estates in the vicinity used to visit this mountain. The folklore about the temple is well known to residents. People who were working on cleaning the peak for a tea plantation when they found an arrow-like steel rod that was believed to be an arrow used by Rama during his war with Ravana as described in Ramayana. Since the day that arrow was found, the place started to be worshiped by Hindus and visited by pilgrims.

=== Sutton Hill ===
Landscape of Sutton Hill

The Sutton division is administratively part of Holmwood Estate. It is situated at the bottom of a mountain range known as Sutton Hill (Tamil: சட்டன் தேரி). The highest point 5,425 feet (1,654 m) above sea level which is a 900 feet (270 m) steep slope from Agrapatana town where the elevation is 4,500 feet (1,400 m).

=== Estate School ===
The Estate School is the second educational institute after the pre-school. Estate school covers up to Grade V. Its five teachers include the Principal. The school opened in the 1960s.

== Climate ==
Holmwood Estate shares the climatic conditions prevailing in Nuwara Eliya. It is Hill Country Climate: From January to April the temperature ranges from 21 to 14 °C, May to 18–16 August °C and from September to 18–15 December °C. Seasons are milder than in Nuwara Eliya. The forest cover in the South is evidence for its climatic richness.
