= Auclaye =

Coordinates: 51.137°N 0.332°W

- Site of Special Scientific Interest
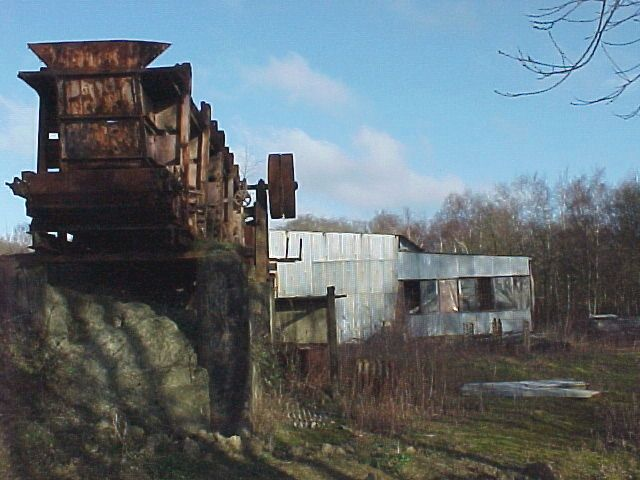
- Location of Auclaye.
- Area of search: Surrey
- Grid reference: TQ 168 388
- Interest: Geological
- Area: 0.6 hectares (1.5 acres)
- Notification date: 1988
- Location map: Magic Map

Auclaye is a 0.6-hectare (1.5-acre) geological Site of Special Scientific Interest south of Capel in Surrey. It is a Geological Conservation Review site.

This site is important for its Mesozoic insects, with many well preserved bodies from several orders dating to the Lower Cretaceous period. It has produced new species of aculeate hymenoptera and cricket.

The site is private land with no public access.
