= Warnham railway station =

Railway station in West Sussex, England

Coordinates: 51.093°N 0.329°W

Warnham
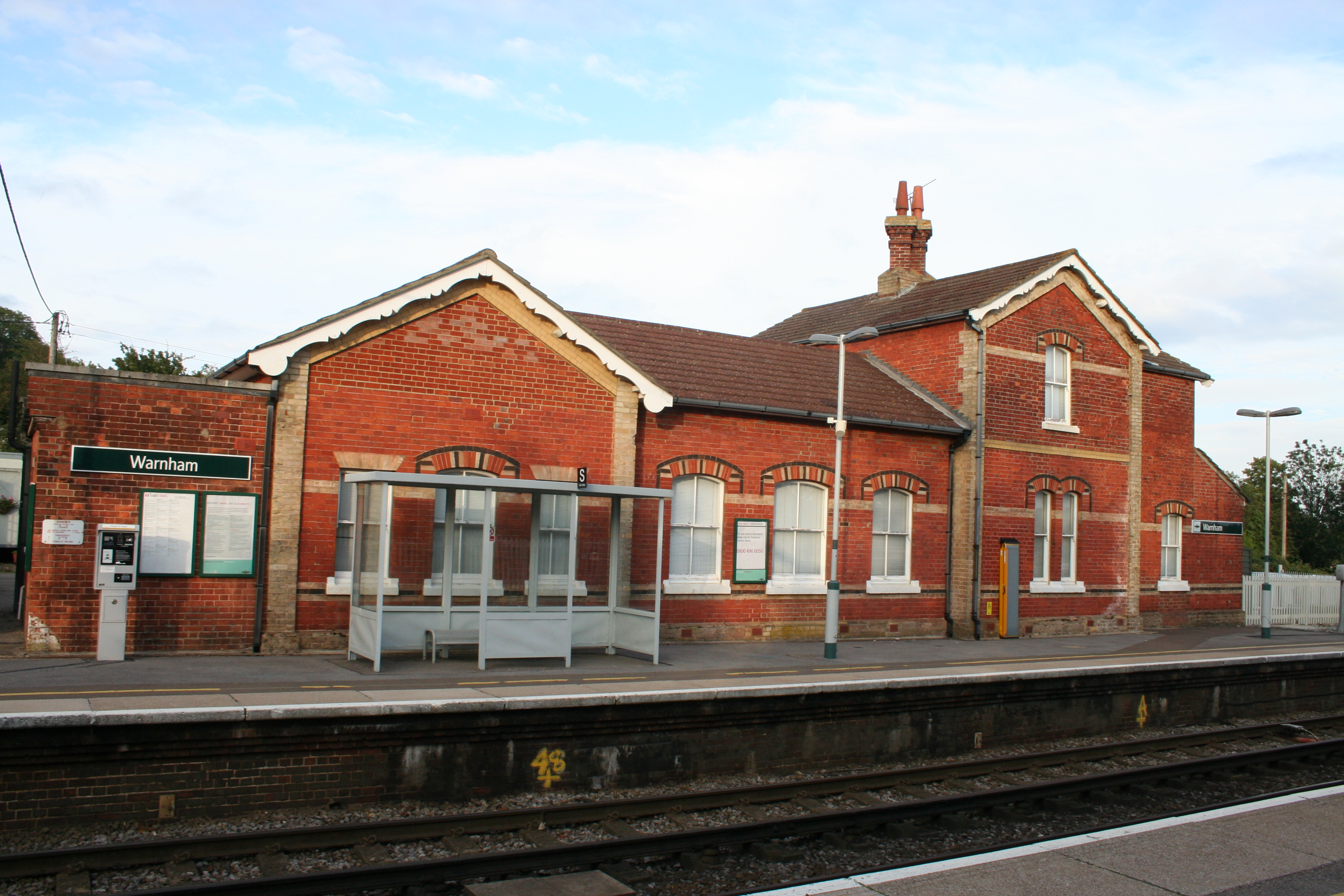

General information
- Location: Warnham, District of Horsham; England
- Grid reference: TQ170339
- Manager: Southern
- Platforms: 2

Other information
- Station code: WNH
- Classification: DfT category F2

History
- Opened: 1 May 1867

Passengers
- 2021/22: ▲6,942
- 2022/23: ▲8,180
- 2023/24: ▲8,288
- 2024/25: ▲9,706
- 2025/26: ▼9,112
Location
Notes
- Passenger statistics from the Office of Rail and Road

Warnham railway station serves the village of Warnham in West Sussex, England. It is 33 miles 46 chains (54.0 km) measured from London Waterloo (although London-bound trains run to Victoria). Warnham is managed by Southern, which also operates all the services.

== Services ==
All services at Warnham are operated by Southern using Class 377 EMUs.

The typical off-peak service in trains per hour is:

- 1 tph to London Victoria via Sutton
- 1 tph to Horsham

There is no service on Saturday evenings (after approximately 18:30) or on Sundays.

Preceding station	National Rail	Following station
Ockley	Southern Sutton & Mole Valley Lines Monday-Saturday only	Horsham

== Gallery ==
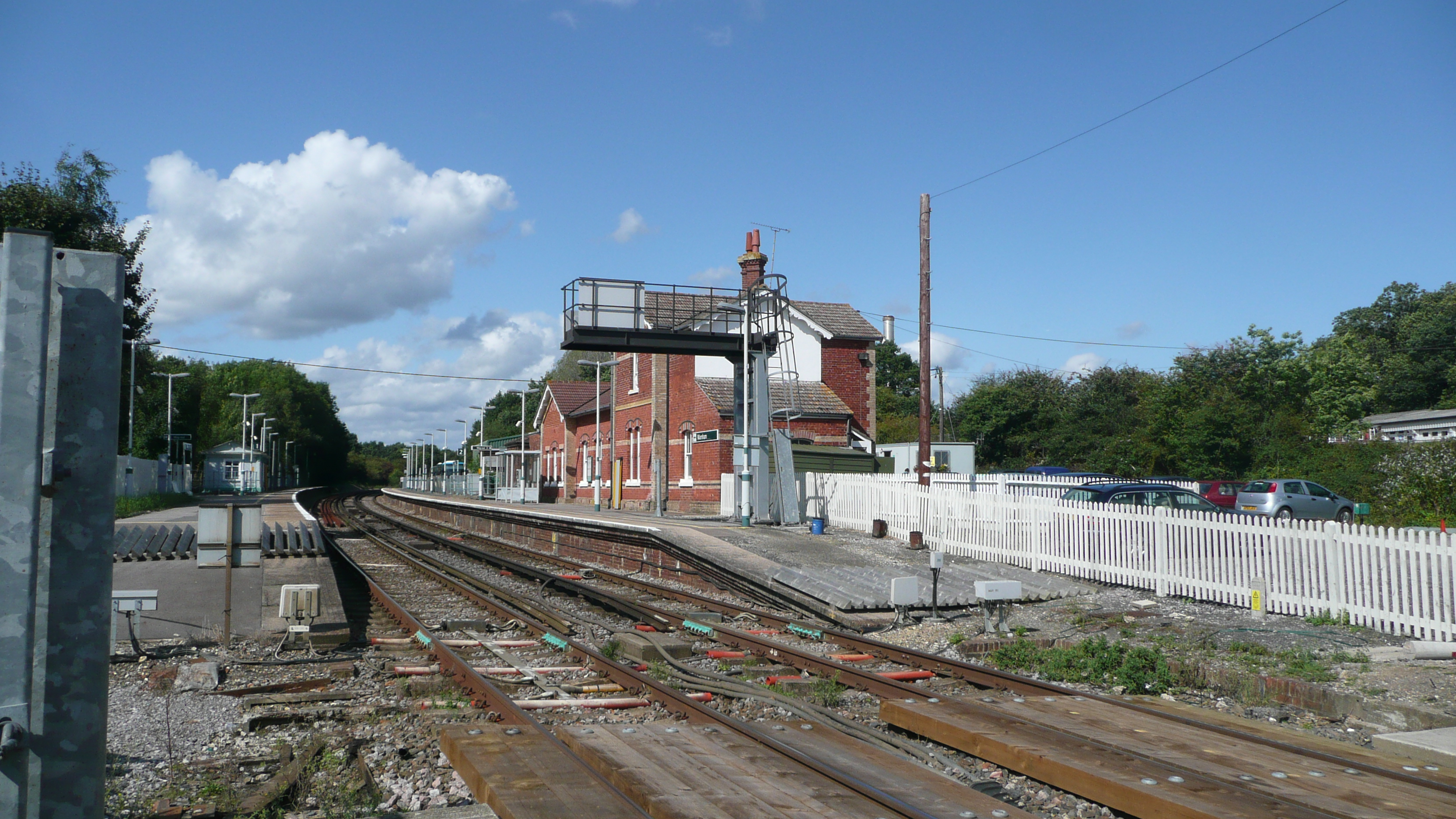
Both platforms of the station.

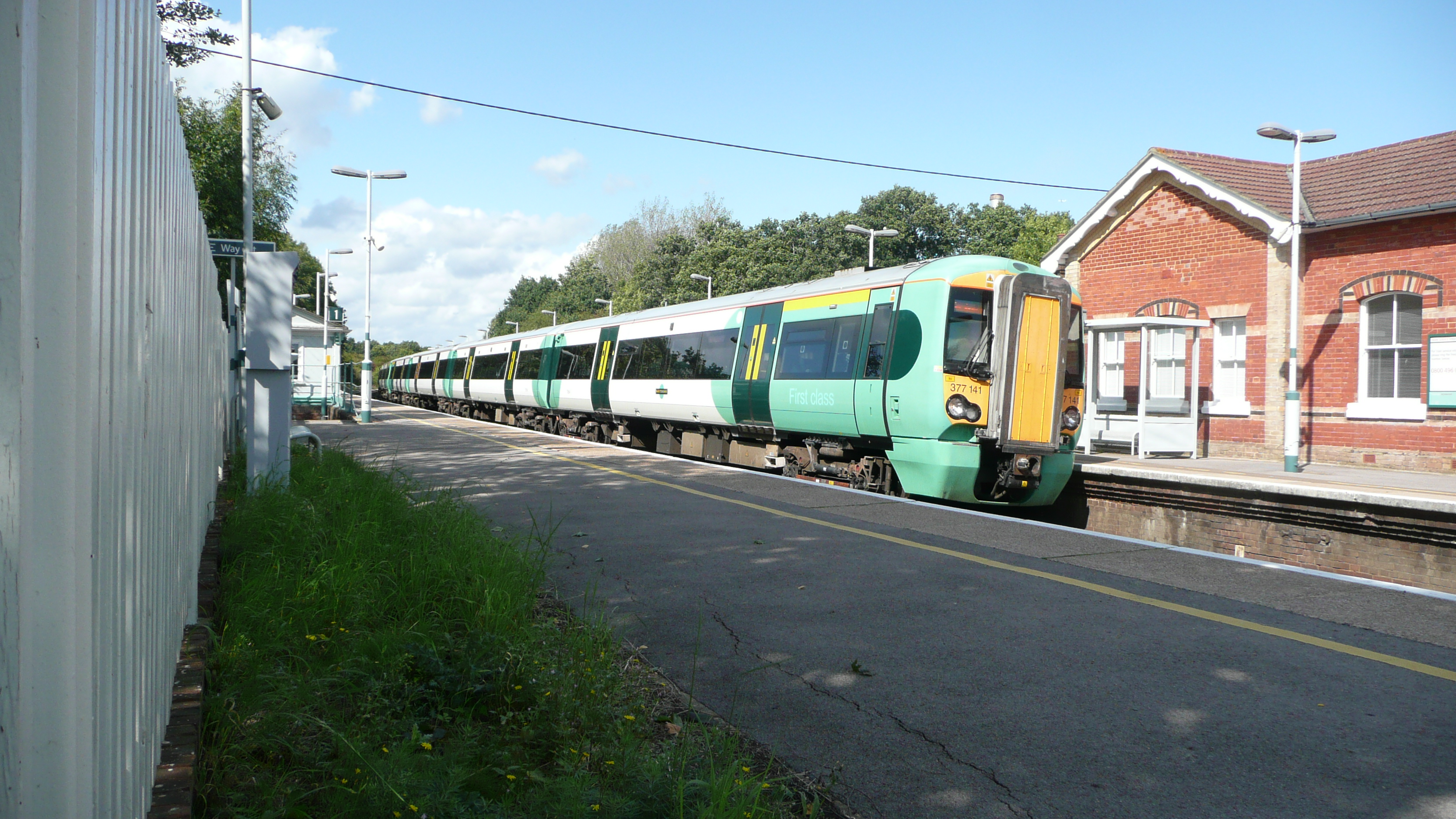
Train 377 141 in the station.

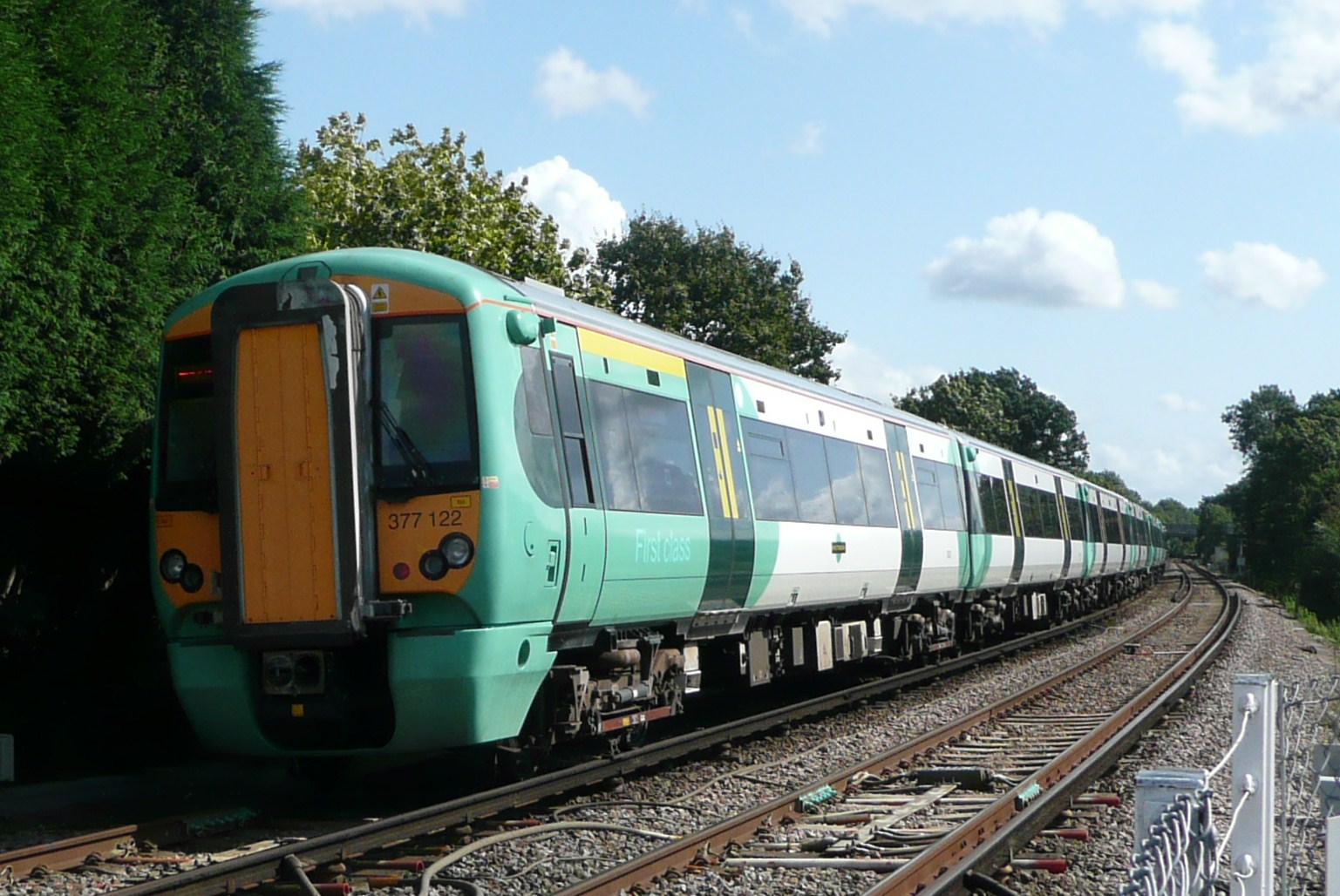
Train 377 122 leaving the station for Horsham.
