= Kingsdown, Dover =

Village in Kent, England

Coordinates: 51.1862°N 1.3954°E

Kingsdown
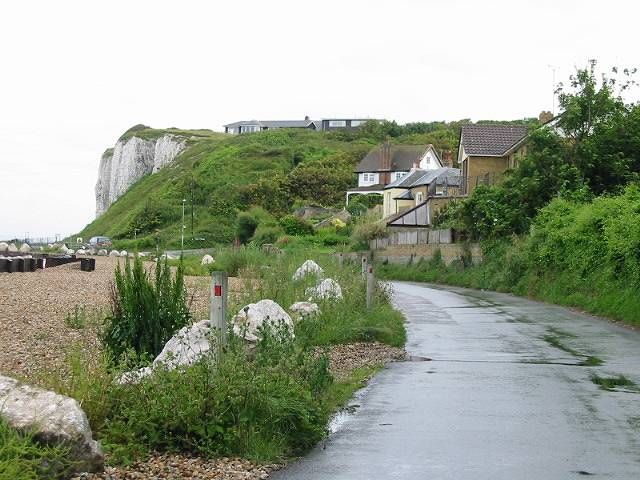

- Location within Kent
- Area: 0.787 km^{2} (0.304 sq mi)
- Population: 1,692 (2021 census)
  - Density: 2,150/km^{2} (5,600/sq mi)
- OS grid reference: TR373484
- Civil parish: Ringwould with Kingsdown
- District: Dover
- Shire county: Kent
- Region: South East
- Country: England
- Sovereign state: United Kingdom
- Post town: DEAL
- Postcode district: CT14
- Dialling code: 01304
- Police: Kent
- Fire: Kent
- Ambulance: South East Coast
- UK Parliament: Dover and Deal

Kingsdown is a village on the English Channel coast of Kent. Parts of the village are built on or behind the shingle beach that runs north to Deal and beyond, while other parts are on the cliffs and hills inland. The village church of St John the Evangelist was built by local landowner William Curling in 1848. Curling's former residence, Kingsdown House, was acquired by the Brightstone Holiday Centre in 1934 and a holiday camp, now known as Kingsdown Holiday Park, has operated in the grounds up to the present day. It is in the civil parish of Ringwould with Kingsdown. In 2019 it had an estimated population of 1764.

== History ==
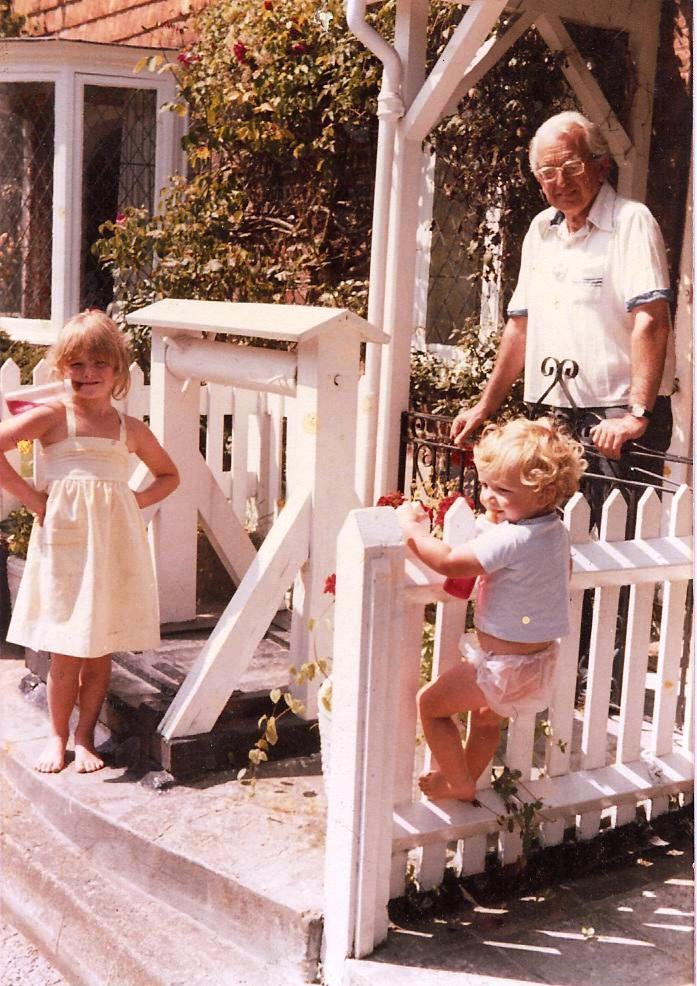
The well at Well Cottage on Upper Street provided the water for much of the village for hundreds of years

Looking up Upper Street towards the Kings Head pub after a heavy snowfall

A settlement or hamlet at Kingsdown is described in antiquity.

During the Middle Ages, the coastal confederation of Cinque Ports consisted of 42 towns and villages. These included Kingsdown, as a "limb" (subordinate affiliate) of Dover.

While the inland areas are devoted to farming, the modern village expanded in the 19th century as a fishing community. As at Deal and Walmer to the north, the steeply shelving shingle beach posed a challenge to the ingenuity of local fishermen, who installed fixed capstans along the shore in order to haul their boats out of the water. Many of the older sheds and houses on the beach date from this period.

Kingsdown was also at the southern end of the important anchorage known as The Downs, which is sheltered between the coast of Kent and the Goodwin Sands that lie offshore to the east. In the late 19th century, The Downs was widely used by hundreds of sailing ships that needed to ride out bad weather, although many ships came to grief on the Goodwins. A lifeboat station was built at Kingsdown in 1866 and was in operation until 1927. The nearest lifeboat is now based at Walmer to the north. From 1863, Oldstairs Bay at the south of Kingsdown Beach was also the location for an important Coastguard station and the substantial coastguard houses that remain (which are now privately occupied).

In 1926, the first woman to swim the English Channel, 19-year-old Gertrude Ederle, made landfall at Kingsdown, after a 35-mile crossing (the direct distance is 21 miles) in record time. Kingsdown's proximity to France placed it on the front line of several wars. The defences at Walmer Castle, one mile north of the village, recall historic threats in Tudor and Napoleonic times, but there is also a reminder of more recent conflicts south of Oldstairs Bay where the former Royal Marines rifle range lies inland of concrete sea defences built by the Ministry of Defence. During World War I, a military airfield operated from Hawkshill Freedown between Kingsdown and Walmer. In World War II, Kingsdown was the location for a secret radio transmitting ground station for Oboe, that provided a navigation system designed to help aircraft locate themselves on operations over enemy occupied territory.

== Geography ==
Kingsdown is located at the northern end of the White Cliffs of Dover; the village itself sits below the chalk cliff and in the valleys leading down to the shore, with some outlying buildings and the holiday camp on top or midway up. The chalk, which dates from the Cretaceous period, is a natural aquifer that forms the source for Kingsdown Water, which is extracted to the north west of the village. The Kingsdown foreshore is the most southerly point of a shingle bank and flood plain that stretches north to the Isle of Thanet.

The beach and downs around the village are important for migrating birds and insects, and for rare plants. The beach and cliffs are part of the Site of Special Scientific Interest that stretches south to Folkestone. The beach is largely shingle but low tide exposes some sandy areas and a chalk shelf stretching out to sea, particularly in the area of Oldstairs Bay at the southern end.

== Transport ==
There are no railway stations in the village itself, but a bus service run by Stagecoach South East connects the village to Walmer railway station, which has direct trains to London. Since 2009, this also provides a link to the high-speed domestic service High Speed 1 running to London St Pancras International, with connections at either Dover Priory, Ashford International or Ramsgate.

== Walking and cycling ==
Kingsdown has numerous local public footpaths and lies on both the Saxon Shore Way and the White Cliffs Country Trail. The section of National Cycle Route 1 known as the Cliffs and Castles route runs through Kingsdown on its way from Dover to Sandwich. A flat, purpose-built cycleway leads north from the outskirts of the village along the beach to Deal. In Kingsdown itself, part of the cycle route follows quiet public roads or footpaths.

== Notable people ==
- David Gordon Hines
