= North Holmwood =

Neighbourhood of Dorking, Surrey, England

Coordinates: 51.2121°N 0.3228°W

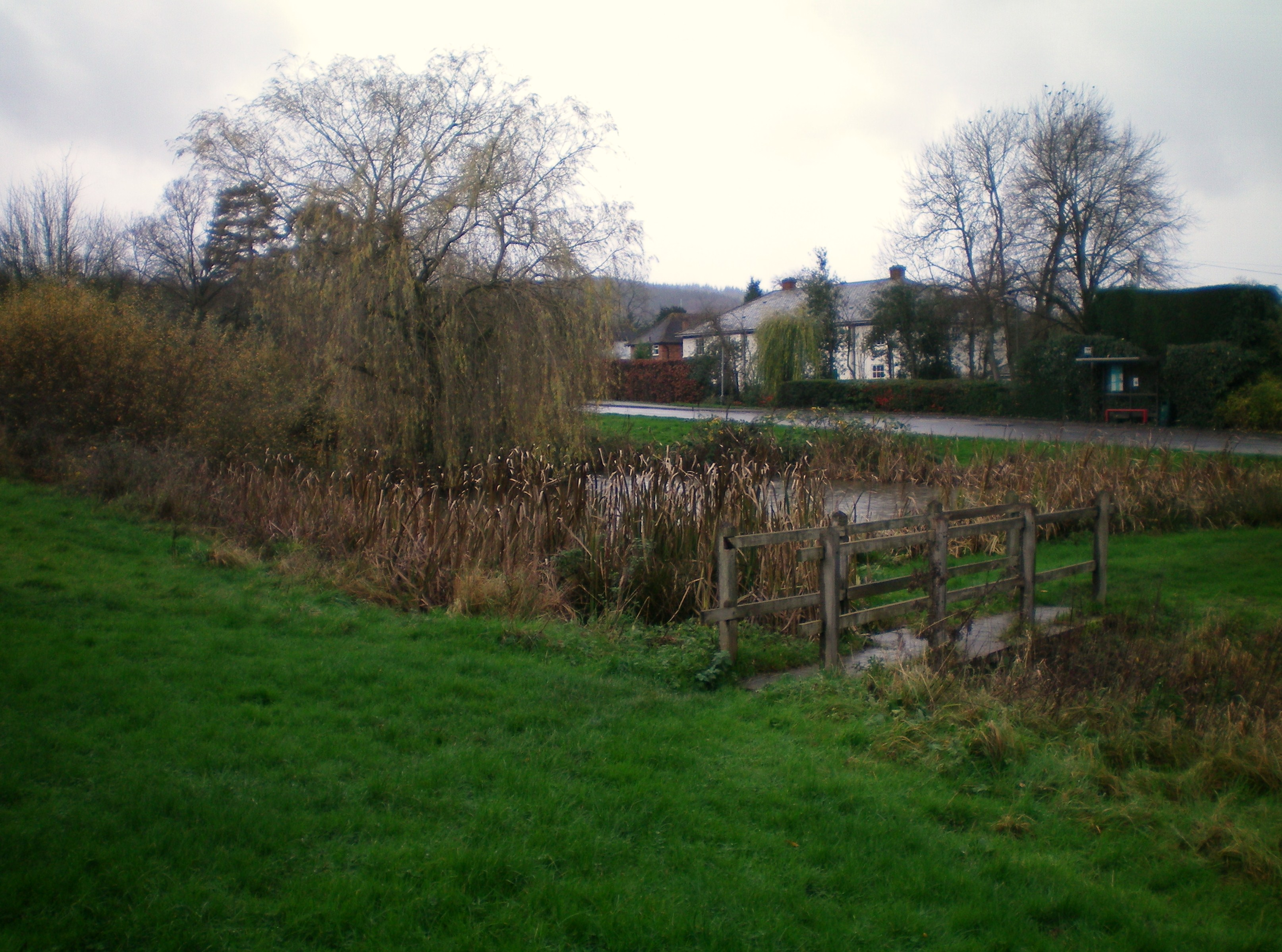
- The village pond

- Location within Surrey
- Population: <6,000
- OS grid reference: TQ172472
- District: Mole Valley
- Shire county: Surrey
- Region: South East
- Country: England
- Sovereign state: United Kingdom
- Post town: Dorking
- Postcode district: RH5
- Dialling code: 01306
- Police: Surrey
- Fire: Surrey
- Ambulance: South East Coast
- UK Parliament: Dorking and Horley

North Holmwood is a residential area on the outskirts of Dorking, in Surrey, England. The village is accessible from the A24, the village's historic heart is the road Spook Hill. The 2011 census for the broader area Holmwoods shows a population of 6,417 and that North Holmwood forms part of the Dorking Built-up Area.

== The village ==
The village has a main street called Spook Hill, in which there is a newsagent's shop. There are other main built-up roads: Bentsbrook Road, Bentsbrook Park (no through roads) and Holmesdale Road leading to Inholms Lane, completing a circuit, and smaller roads and estates such as St John's. The residential area of Stonebridge in the east is linked by residential roads to Spook Hill, as is Chart Downs across Bent's Brook. There is a village hall, a clinic called Holmwood Surgery and a local sports and social club. There is a pond, opposite the newsagent's, alongside Spook Hill.

Holmwood Common is immediately to the south of North Holmwood. The approximately 600-acre (2.4 square kilometer) ancient wooded area was once owned by Harold II and William the Conqueror and is currently under the management of the National Trust. Public footpaths extend into the common from North Holmwood at Saint John's Church and Inholms Lane to the east of the church.

The main estate in North Holmwood occupies the former site of Dorking Brickworks, which was a major local employer from the 1930s until its closure in 1983. The brickworks used up the clay surrounding it, ran out of space in the 1950s and extended south of Inholms Lane in 1961. The clay supply was exhausted, and the brickworks closed in 1983. After demolition, the brickworks land north of Inholms Lane was used to build residential housing, while the smaller excavation south of Inholms Lane was designated a nature reserve, now the Inholms clay pit LNR, open to all and accessed by a tunnel under Inholms Lane.

== The parish church ==
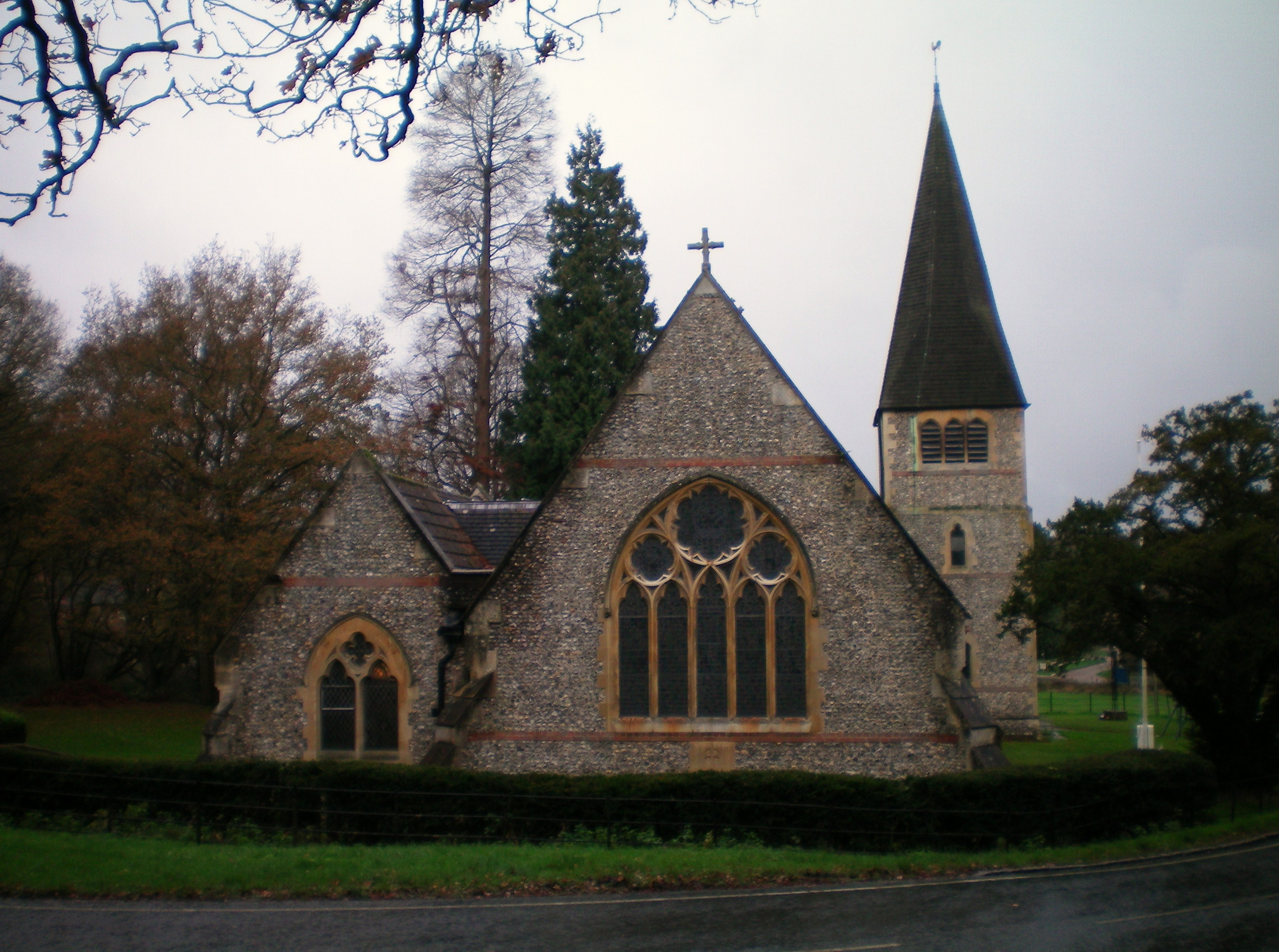
Church of St John the Evangelist

A parish of Holmwood was created from parts of Dorking and Capel parishes in 1839. The parish church was built of flint in Early English style and consecrated in 1875. The tower contains two bells and a clock. The east window of the chancel has stained glass from 1874 made by Messrs Powell of White Friars. The west windows of the chancel have glass designed by Charles Eamer Kempe from 1891 showing the four Fathers of the Western Church.

== Transport ==
North Holmwood has two bus stops either side of the newsagent's shop. The nearest railway station is Dorking 2.5 miles (4.0 km) north. "Holmwood" is on the far side of South Holmwood, over 4 miles (6.4 km) away.
