= Shiremark Mill, Capel =

Windmill in Surrey, England

Capel Windmill
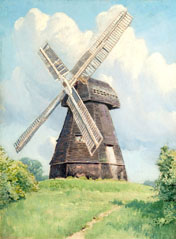
- Shiremark Mill, c.1919
- Interactive map of Capel Windmill

Origin
- Mill name: Shiremark Mill; Kingsfold Mill; Capel Mill
- Grid reference: TQ 1719 3760
- Coordinates: 51°07′33″N 0°19′36″W
- Year built: 1774

Information
- Purpose: Corn mill
- Type: Smock mill
- Storeys: Three-storey smock
- Base storeys: Single-storey base
- Smock sides: Eight sides
- No. of sails: Four sails
- Type of sails: Double Patent sails
- Windshaft: Cast iron
- Winding: Hand winded by wheel and chain
- No. of pairs of millstones: Two pairs
- Year lost: Burnt down 1972
- Other information: Only windmill with stones on a hurst frame south of the River Thames

Shiremark Mill, also known as Kingsfold Mill or Capel Mill, was a listed Smock mill at Capel, Surrey, England, which was burnt down in 1972.

== History ==
Shiremark Mill was built in 1774, incorporating some material from a demolished open trestle post mill which had stood at Clark's Green (TQ 176 398, 51°08′42″N 0°19′12″W). It was so named because it stood close to the border with Sussex, and although often thought of as a Sussex mill, actually stood just within Surrey by some 20 yards (18 m).

The mill was offered for sale in 1777, described as "new-built" and in 1802 was acquired by the Stone family, who were to work it until 1919. In 1886, the mill was tailwinded and the cap and sails were blown off. Messrs Grist and Steele, the Horsham millwrights replaced them that year. The mill worked by wind until 1919, when it was stopped on account of a defective curb.

Shiremark Mill slowly became derelict, an inspection by Rex Wailes in 1933 resulted in an estimated repair cost of £100. The cap boarding was repaired but the mill was again left to deteriorate. In 1950, Capel Parish Council approached the Society for the Protection of Ancient Buildings and the owner of the mill with a view to securing the mill's preservation. The mill had been listed as an antiquity by Surrey County Council by 1951. In 1952, a detailed inspection of the mill found that the sills and lower part of the cant posts were rotten. Thompson's, the Alford millwrights estimated that the mill would cose £2,500 to restore. The main beams of the first floor were supported by brick piers, but no other work was done. Although the mill had all four sails in 1928, the sails fell off one by one, with the last falling in 1956. Photographs show that the cap was intact in August 1958, but by May 1966 the roof had gone, exposing the brake wheel to the weather.

== Description ==
Shiremark Mill was a three-storey smock mill on a single-storey base. There was no stage, earth having been thrown up against the base to form a mill mound. It last worked with four double Patent sails carried on a cast-iron windshaft. The cap was winded by a hand wheel.

=== Base ===
The single storey octagonal brick base was 8 feet 6 inches (2.59 m) from floor level to the top of the brickwork internally. Externally it was 5 feet (1.52 m) from ground level to the top of the brickwork, earth having been embanked against the base to allow the sails to be reached for reefing, the mill having originally been built with Common sails. The brickwork tapered in thickness, being 14 inches (356 mm) thick at the top. It was 24 feet (7.32 m) across the flats. By 2006 the base was the only remaining part of the mill, although largely hidden by dense undergrowth.

=== Smock ===
The three-storey smock tower rested on oak sills of 10 inches (254 mm) by 6 inches (152 mm) in section. The eight oak cant posts were 10 inches (254 mm) were 9 inches (229 mm) square and 21 feet (6.40 m) long, and carried a circular oak curb of 14 feet (4.27 m) diameter at the top. There were two sets of 6 inches (152 mm) square oak transoms at appropriate heights which carried the joists for the internal floors. Each of the twenty-four frames was infilled with a vertical oak post 5 inches (127 mm) square and two diagonal struts 5 by 3 1/2 inches (127 by 89 mm) in section. On the bottom floor of the smock there were two doors on opposite sides to enable access whatever direction the sails were facing.

Internally, the bottom floor of the smock was at two levels, with a 4 feet (1.22 m) height difference. The main beams were 23 feet (7.01 m) long and 12 inches (305 mm) square on 6 feet 6 inches (1.98 m) centres. These formed the base of the Hurst Frame, a feature more commonly found in watermills than windmills. Shiremark mill is the only recorded windmill with a hurst frame south of the River Thames. A surviving windmill with a hurst frame is Chesterton Mill, Warwickshire.

=== Cap ===
The cap was 17 feet (5.18 m) by 14 feet (4.27 m) in plan, and 10 feet 6 inches (3.20 m) in height above the curb. The mill was 40 feet (12.19 m) high from the ground floor to the cap ridge, thus 36 feet 6 inches (11.13 m) from ground level to roof externally. The main cap frame consisted of two sheers, each 12 inches (305 mm) square in section and 16 feet (4.88 m), set 10 feet (3.05 m) apart. The main cross members were the breast beam, the sprattle beam and the tail beam, in order from head to tail. The cross members extended each side of the sheers to form a base for the nine pairs of roof rafters. There was no ridge board to the roof.

The cap was winded by a hand wheel of 8 feet (2.44 m) diameter housed just inside the rear of the cap. The worm wheel that engaged with the cogs set into the top of the tower was latterly a cast-iron one, replacing an earlier wooden one. It was necessary to pull about a 1/4 mile (400 m) of chain to turn the mill through 180 degrees.

=== Sails and windshaft ===
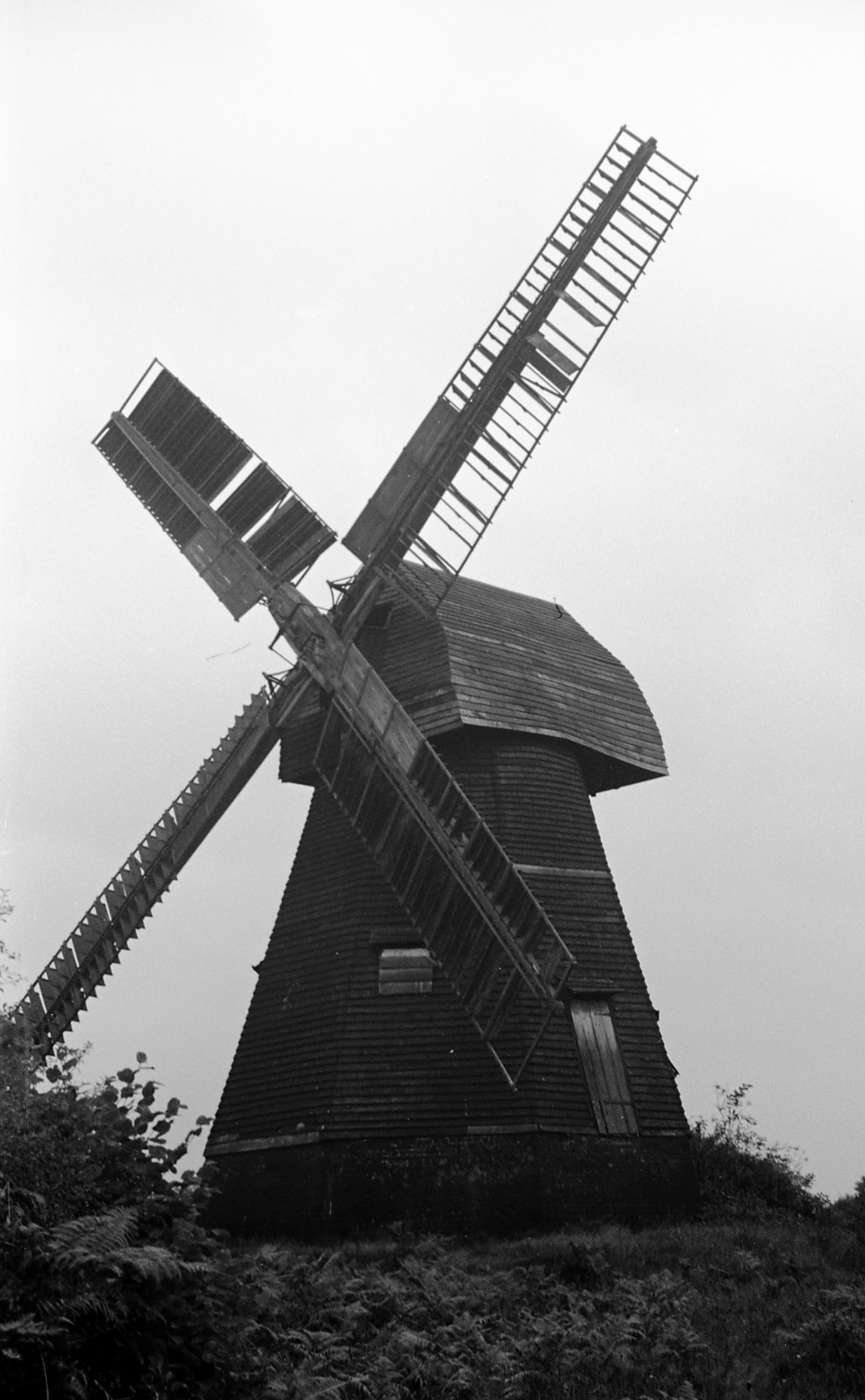
Shiremark Mill in the 1930s

The mill was built with four Common sails. After it was tailwinded in 1886, a new cap, windshaft and four double Patent sails were fitted. The sails were 6 feet 10 inches (2.08 m) wide and spanned 60 feet (18.29 m). Each pair of sails was carried on a stock 39 feet (11.89 m) long and of 14 inches (360 mm) by 12 inches (300 mm) section at the canister, tapering to 6 inches (150 mm) square at the tips. Each stock was strengthened by a pair of clamps, 10 feet (3.05 m) long and 8 inches (200 mm) by 5 inches (130 mm) in section.

The cast-iron windshaft is 16 feet (4.88 m) long overall, with a canister at the outer end to carry the stocks. It was 12 inches (300 mm) diameter at the neck bearing, 8 1/2 inches (220 mm) square at the boss for the brake wheel and 6 inches (150 mm) diameter at the tail, the tail bearing itself being 4 inches (100 mm) diameter. The windshaft carried a 9 feet (2.74 m) diameter clasp arm Brake wheel, which had been converted from compass arm construction, the original windshaft having been of wood. The brake wheel had 75 cogs. The windshaft from Shiremark Mill was used in the restoration of Ripple Mill, Ringwould, Kent in 1994.

=== Machinery ===
The elm Upright Shaft was 21 feet (6.40 m) long It carried a cast-iron Wallower 3 feet (910 mm) diameter Wallower, cast in halves and having 26 teeth. It replaced an earlier wooden wheel. The underside of the wallower had a friction ring which drove the sack hoist. At the foot of the Upright Shaft, a wooden clasp arm Great Spur Wheel of 6 feet 6 inches (1.98 m) diameter with 70 cogs was carried. This drove the two pairs of millstones underdrift. The French Burr stones were driven by a stone nut with 20 cogs, and the Peak stones were driven by a stone nut with 18 cogs. Each pair of millstones was controlled by its own governor, missing at the time of the survey in 1952.

== Millers ==
- David Southow, 1774–1777
- John Stone, 1802–
- Thomas Stone
- G. Stone
- Eliza Stone
- John Chantler, c. 1875
- William Rapley, 1886
- George Stone, 1919

== Culture and literature ==
Hilaire Belloc mentions Shiremark Mill in the preface to The Four Men.
