= St Anthony's Hospital, North Cheam =

St. Anthony's Hospital
- Spire Healthcare
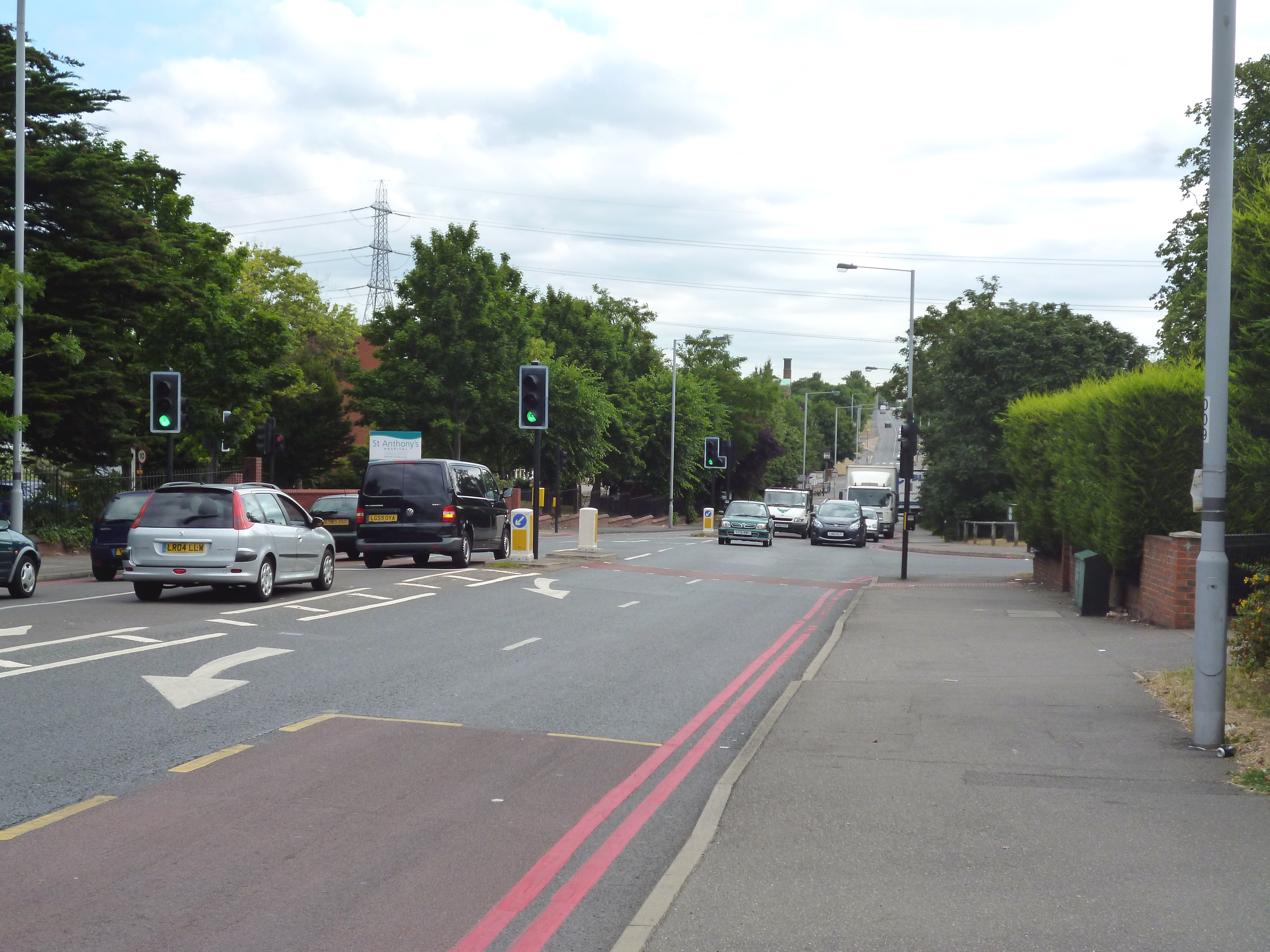
- Entrance to St. Anthony's Hospital (on the left)

- Shown in Sutton

Geography
- Location: 801 London Road, North Cheam, Sutton SM3 9DW, London, England, United Kingdom
- Coordinates: 51°22′46.69″N 0°13′14.49″W

Organisation
- Care system: Private

History
- Founded: 1904; 122 years ago

Links
- Website: www.stanthonys.org.uk
- Lists: Hospitals in England

Spire St Anthony's Hospital is a private hospital in North Cheam, formerly in the county of Surrey, now in the London Borough of Sutton. The hospital is part of the Spire Healthcare group, the second largest provider of private healthcare in the United Kingdom. It was formerly owned and operated by the Daughters of the Cross of Liege, a Roman Catholic religious order. It is located on the junction between the A24 and Gander Green Lane.

== History ==
St Anthony's was founded in 1904. Its location, once the site of North Cheam House, was purchased by the Daughters of the Cross for £4,625. By 1914 the Daughters of the Cross had replaced North Cheam House, erecting a building of three storeys and 163-foot frontage.

The hospital operated a 'pay-by-your-means' policy until 1948, when the National Health Service was formed, causing St Anthony's to begin accepting public patients with funding from the NHS. In the early 1970s, St. Anthony's NHS contract was withdrawn and the hospital reverted to private status. Responding to this change in status, it developed a speciality for cardiac surgery and moved to a smaller purpose-built facility opened by Miles Fitzalan-Howard, 17th Duke of Norfolk in October 1975.

In 1987, the Daughters of the Cross formed St. Raphael's Hospice, a registered charity providing specialist medical and nursing care for those with cancer and other serious illnesses and support for the families of the afflicted.

By 2012, a decline in the membership of the Daughters of the Cross, coupled with the advanced age of many of its members, led the order to seek to divest itself of responsibility for the hospital and hospice. After obtaining a management consultancy's advice, they decided to try to sell the hospital but retain ownership of the hospice. They expected to make a decision on a buyer in December 2013. Staff and consultants of the hospital and the chairman of the hospice board raised concerns about how a sale to a private firm might affect the charity work of the hospice, which is subsidised by hospital revenues, and the ability of the hospital to operate within moral directives of the Catholic Church. In June 2013 they appealed to Vatican officials to prevent the sale, and Paul Burstow, the member of parliament for Sutton and Cheam, said he would seek to have the Foreign Office direct an embassy official to bring the issue to the Vatican's attention. In November 2013, Burstow presented a petition to Parliament, signed by over 7,000 people, requesting government help in blocking the sale. Opponents of the sale hoped for formation of a new Catholic charity to take over the hospital and hospice. In March 2014, it was announced that they were to be sold to Spire Healthcare.

== Facility ==
Spire St Anthony's is a 92-bed private hospital. It provides routine and complex surgery and has an 8-bed intensive care unit.

Spire St Anthony’s offers a wide range of treatments from diagnostic imaging to major surgery covering a range of specialities including orthopaedics, neurosurgery, paediatric day cases, cardiology and cardiac surgery. They have continually invested in development projects to ensure a high standard of accommodation and facilities including six state of the art integrated theatres suites, incorporating three laminar flow and one hybrid theatre. They have also invested in a dedicated physiotherapy suite.

The associated St. Raphael's Hospice is operated as a charity; it employs 53 nurses.

== Performance ==
In 2015/6 it made a loss of £1.5 million, attributed to delays in the redevelopment programme by Spire.

== Transport ==
- 93 from North Cheam to Putney Bridge tube station
- 293 from Epsom Hospital to Morden tube station
- 413 from Sutton Bus Garage to Morden tube station
- S3 from Sutton Hospital to Malden Manor railway station

== See also ==
- List of hospitals in England
