= Ringwould with Kingsdown =

Civil parish in Kent, England

Coordinates: 51.180°N 1.3857°E

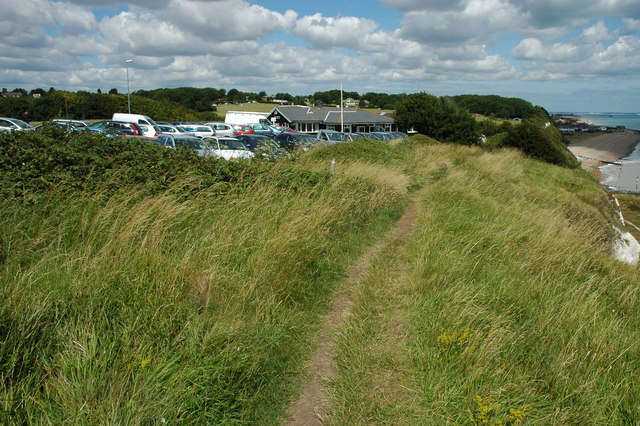
- Walmer and Kingsdown Golf Course

- Location within Kent
- Population: 2,030 (2011)
- Civil parish: Ringwould with Kingsdown
- District: Dover
- Shire county: Kent
- Region: South East
- Country: England
- Sovereign state: United Kingdom
- Post town: DEAL
- Postcode district: CT14
- Dialling code: 01304
- Police: Kent
- Fire: Kent
- Ambulance: South East Coast

Ringwould with Kingsdown is a coastal civil parish in the Dover District of Kent, England. The parish contains the villages of Ringwould and Kingsdown. In 2011 it had a population of 2030.

Ringwould with Kingsdown is approximately 40 miles (64 km) east from the county town of Maidstone. The south of the parish is approximately 6 miles (10 km) north-east from the channel port of Dover, and the north, 2 miles (3 km) south from the coastal town of Deal. The A258 Sandwich to Dover road runs through the parish.

Parishes surrounding Ringwould with Kingsdown are Walmer at the north; Ripple at the west; Langdon at the south-west; and St Margaret's at Cliffe at the south. The coastal east of the parish is against the English Channel.

At the south-east of the parish, and against the coast, is Walmer and Kingsdown Golf Course.
