= South Holmwood =

Village in Surrey, England

Coordinates: 51.202°N 0.323°W

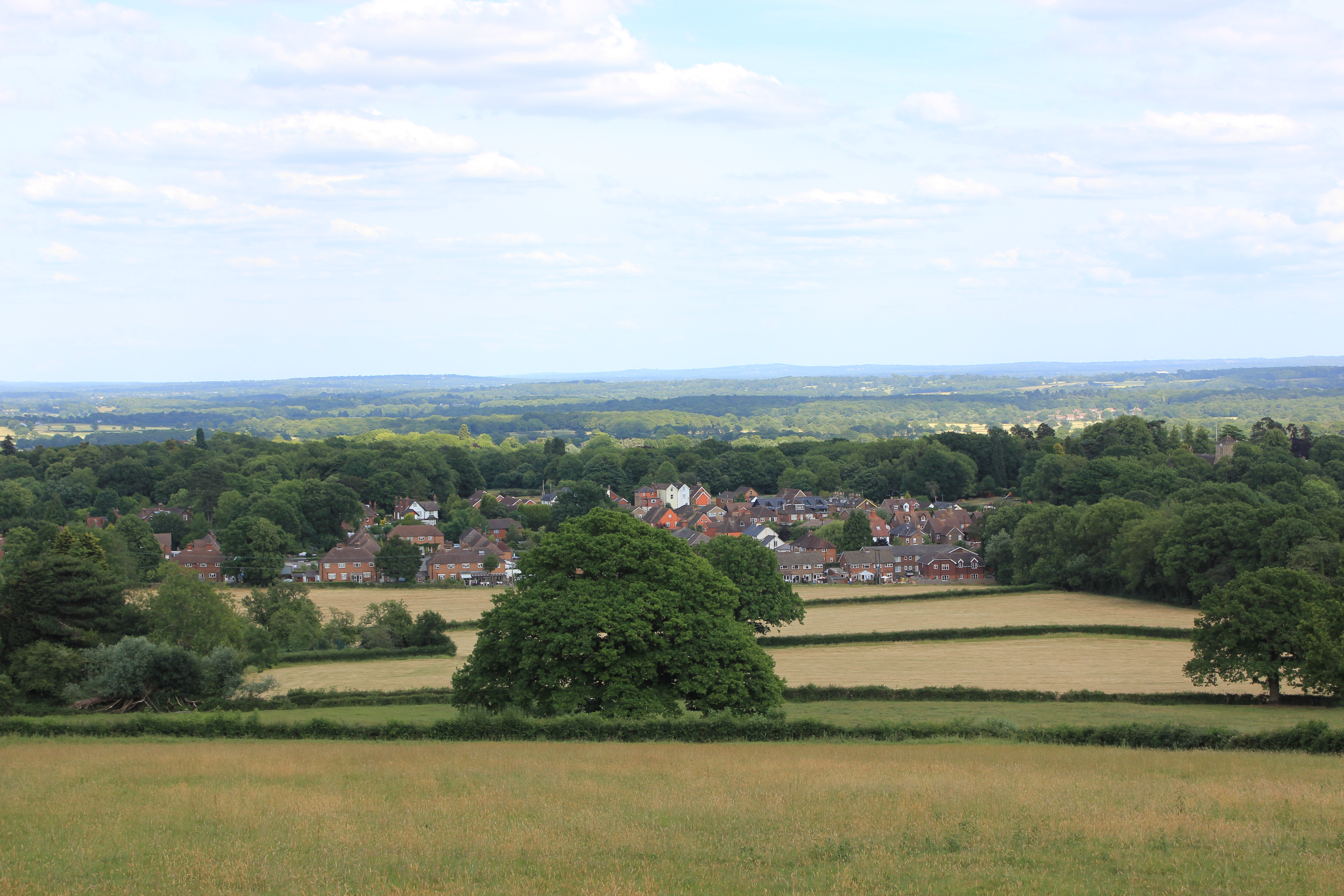
- South Holmwood from Redlands Wood within the parish, a foothill of Leith Hill. St Mary Magdalene is visible to the far right and Holmwood Common contains all of the wood on the far side.

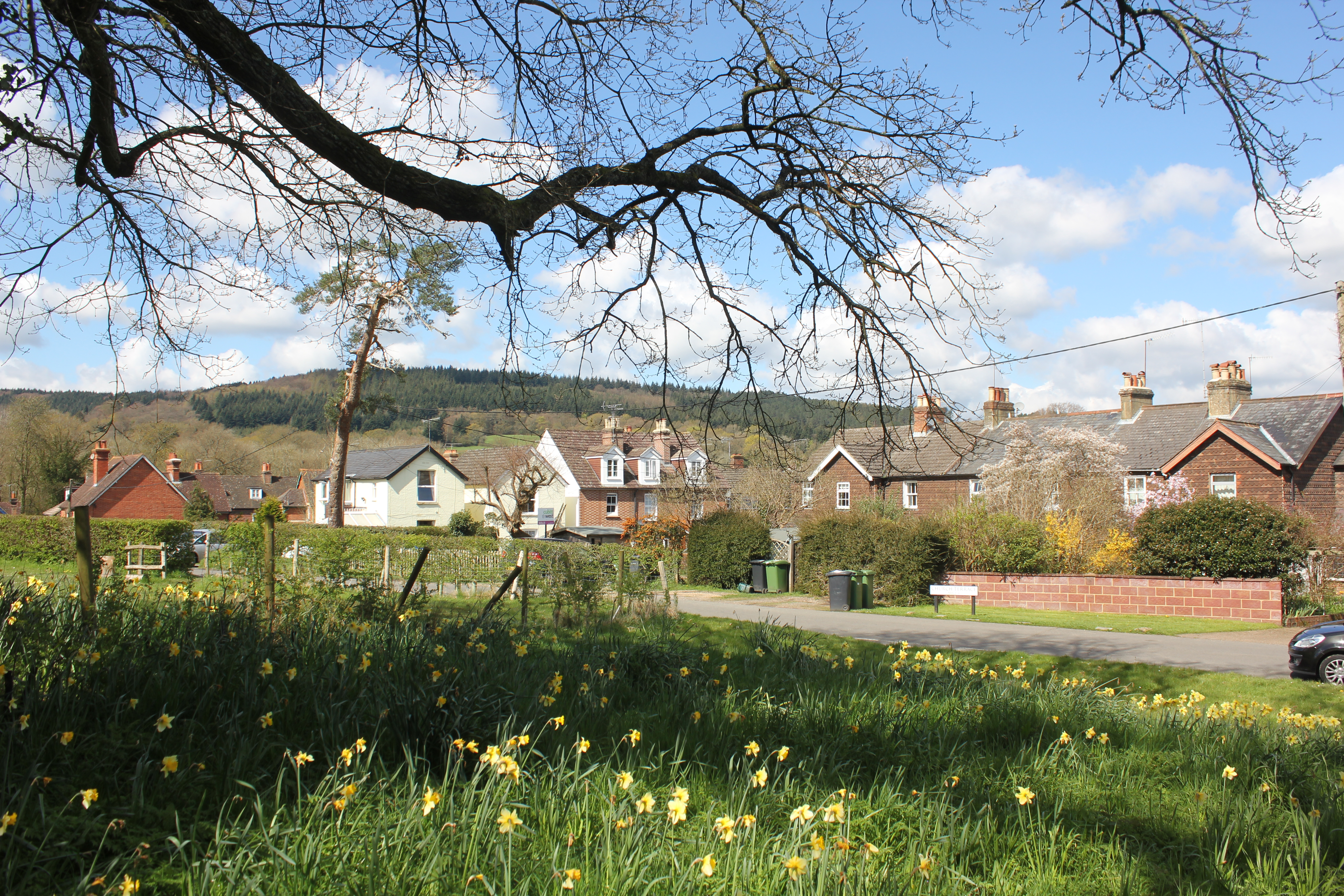
- View of central South Holmwood looking towards the Surrey Hills AONB.

- Location within Surrey
- Area: 7.73 km^{2} (2.98 sq mi)
- Population: 895 (Civil Parish)
  - Density: 116/km^{2} (300/sq mi)
- OS grid reference: TQ1745
- Civil parish: Holmwood
- District: Mole Valley
- Shire county: Surrey
- Region: South East
- Country: England
- Sovereign state: United Kingdom
- Post town: Dorking
- Postcode district: RH5
- Dialling code: 01306
- Police: Surrey
- Fire: Surrey
- Ambulance: South East Coast
- UK Parliament: Dorking and Horley

South Holmwood (/hoʊmwʊd/) is a semi-rural village in Surrey, England. It can be considered cognate with its wider civil parish, which stretches to the east to embrace Holmwood Common, but does not include Mid Holmwood, or North Holmwood, the latter being contiguous with Dorking. Betchett's Brook is the southern boundary and runs through a locality known as Holmwood Corner. However, Holmwood railway station is within the parish of Capel, although connected to the South Holmwood by a curved path passing through Holmwood Corner Common. Centred 3 miles (4.8 km) south of Dorking, South Holmwood is on the A24 London to Worthing road, a dual carriageway through the village.

== Geography ==
Holmwood forms part of the area under Mole Valley Borough Council; the main settlement is a small, clustered area bypassed by the A24 road. The smaller settlement of Holmwood Corner is half within the district, but the part beyond Betchett's Brook is considered to be in Beare Green, which is also convenient to the railway station, see Transport.

A country path, with a footbridge across the brook runs between the houses in Holmwood Corner, to the station at the end of Bregsell's Lane (running underneath the A24 and railway line). This forms a gentle curve through Holmwood Corner Common. A pavement on the opposite side of the dual carriageway feeds into a footpath that runs by the Anglican parish church so similarly connecting South Holmwood's main cluster of residential streets.

== History ==
The only settlement with a manor within the parish of Dorking and mentioned in the Domesday Book is Anstie, a smallholding rendering only twelve shillings per year to its overlords, who were Baldwin son of Herlewin, with William, son of Ansculf, holding has tenant-in-chief.

Holmwood Borough was an ancient division of Dorking, to the south of the town. The ancient spelling in the Court Rolls is invariably Homewood. As far back as 1329 the reeves' accounts include carriage of firewood from 'Dorkynge [h]Ywode vel Homewode' to Kingston. The distinction between the "High Wood", the skirts of the big forest of the Weald, and the "Home Wood" sufficiently explains the name. In 1562 Kingston still depended upon this neighbourhood for firewood. Manning and Bray state that by the early 19th century Dorking was "supplied lately" with coal from Kingston.

Dispersed farmsteads that replaced those of medieval origin work the near western and far eastern fields beyond the common. Cottages have generally been replaced here, except for Betchets Green Cottage and Stoneheal, a 17th-century timber-framed building.

South Holmwood (as it is known today) only became a significant settlement in the 19th century, when the turnpike road was built from Epsom to Brighton via Worthing. The district of St Mary, Holmwood, was detached from Dorking and Capel parishes as a separate parish in 1838. The school of the parish of St Mary Magdalen, Holmwood, was built in 1844 and enlarged in 1870 and 1884. The village prospered from the increased traffic and from the presence of large country houses such as Anstie Grange and Holmwood Park. The former led to the founding of such places as the cottages and travellers' inn in Mid Holmwood, and relatively well-to-do villas such as The Dutch House in South Holmwood. The village saw a bisection from its cricket ground on Holmwood Common, with the extension of the turnpike road, now the A24, in 1971. The main residential area of the village is overlooked by the Grade II-listed parish church of St Mary Magdalene, built in 1838 and designed by John Burges Watson. It stands five or ten metres higher than the Victorian network of streets, and 100 metres to the south of them. A disused section of the Roman road Stane Street passes to the west of the village, where there is one of the few changes in its alignment.

== Notable people ==
- Moor Cottage, South Holmwood, was the birthplace of the novelist E. Arnot Robertson (1903–1961). She passed her childhood at Templeton, off Horsham Road.
- Cuthbert Heath, pioneering Lloyd's of London executive, lived in Anstie Grange, a mansion in Holmwood.
- Major Rohde Hawkins, famous London architect, designed and built Redlands, South Holmwood, where he lived until his death in 1884. Hawkins also designed St John the Evangelist Church in North Holmwood c.1874.

=== Holmwood Station ===
Until at least the 1940s, the area around Holmwood railway station was called Holmwood; postcards sold for example from the 1930s of the (former) White Hart Inn and of the Musicians' Union Convalescent Home (now Merebank House), both south of Holmwood station, have them described in the text on the face of the postcard as Holmwood. Newspaper articles in the Dorking and Leatherhead Advertiser, about the musicians' home in the Dorking and Leatherhead Advertiser throughout the 1930s, referred to it, and the White Hart 50 yards away, as being in Holmwood. The term Beare Green was certainly then used only to describe the area around the large green that is on the other side of the A24 dual carriageway that came later, where the Duke's Head pub is.

Nowadays, with the exception of Holmwood Station, the plain term Holmwood is normally used only to refer to three settlements, North, Mid, and South Holmwood, that are all close to Dorking; the area with 600 homes around Holmwood Station has been commonly known since at least as far back as the early 1960s as Beare Green, although the smaller area of the original Beare Green, with 100 homes, also bears that name. Until the A24 dual carriageway was built, the distinction between the original Beare Green and the area around Holmwood Station that is now also known as Beare Green was not distinct, as the turnpike road ran through both.

=== Holmwood Common ===
The area is approximately 600 acres (2.4 km^{2}). The Victoria County History of 1911 gives its social geography and history:

A great number of "gentlemen's houses" surround the Common, and some standing upon it represent the original intrusions of squatters upon the waste of the manor [infertile land]—confirmed by lapse of time. Holmwood Park was the seat of the late Mrs. Gough Nichols, widow of the celebrated antiquary. Francis Larpent, Judge Advocate-General to Wellington's army in Spain and in the south of France.

== Demography and housing ==
2011 Census Homes
Output area	Detached	Semi-detached	Terraced	Flats and apartments	Caravans/temporary/mobile homes	shared between households
(Civil Parish)	107	160	60	43	0	0

The average level of accommodation in the region composed of detached houses was 28%, the average that was apartments was 22.6%.

2011 Census Key Statistics
Output area	Population	Households	% Owned outright	% Owned with a loan	hectares
(Civil Parish)	895	370	38.9%	35.7%	773

The proportion of households in the civil parish who owned their home compares with the regional average at 35.1 per cent. The proportion who owned their home with a loan compares with the regional average of 32.5 per cent. The remainder is made up of rented dwellings (plus a negligible percentage of households living rent-free).

== Transport ==
Rail

Holmwood railway station just south of the parish boundary, is on the north–south Mole Valley Line. There are services to London Victoria and also to the south and (via a Dorking connection) to London Waterloo.

Roads

The village is bisected by the A24 road. A local network of roads serves the nucleus of the village. One other principal local road runs due east across Holmwood Common, passing the disused cricket grounds, large forest homes and a car park. Further east, a road runs north and south, giving access to some of the village's small farms.
