= Ringwould =

Village in Kent, England

Coordinates: 51.185°N 1.375°E

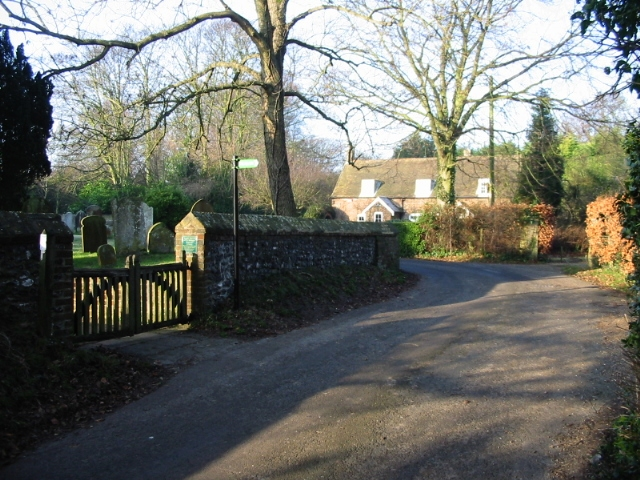
- Church Road, Ringwould

- Location within Kent
- Population: 2,030 (2011)
- OS grid reference: TR3548
- Civil parish: Ringwould with Kingsdown
- District: Dover
- Shire county: Kent
- Region: South East
- Country: England
- Sovereign state: United Kingdom
- Post town: DEAL
- Postcode district: CT14
- Dialling code: 01304
- Police: Kent
- Fire: Kent
- Ambulance: South East Coast

Ringwould is a village and electoral ward near Deal in Kent, England. The village is in the civil parish of Ringwould with Kings Down. The coastal confederation of Cinque Ports during its mediaeval period consisted of a confederation of 42 towns and villages in all. This included Ringwould, as a 'limb' of Dover.

Ripple Windmill, which is being restored, lies within the parish.

The village also has one Grade II listed building, in its district. as well as the Grade I listed church of St Nicholas.

Frederick Ernest Cleary (1905–1984) CBE, who was originally a Chartered Surveyor from Crouch End, London. Later, he formed a very successful company 'Haslemere Estates', who refurbished many of the City of London's fine old buildings during the 1970s and '80s. In 1975 Fred purchased and refurbished an old rectory building ('Ripple Down House') in Ringwould. This became an environmental education centre for children. It later merged with the 'Bay Trust' in St Margeret's Bay who manage and operate the Pines Garden.
