= Agrapatana =

Agrapatana அக்கரப்பத்தனை
- Village
- Location within Sri Lanka
- Coordinates: 6°52′N 80°42′E
- Country: Sri Lanka
- Province: Central Province
- District: Nuwara Eliya
- Established: 1883
- Elevation: 1,382 m (4,533 ft)
- Time zone: UTC5:30 (Sri Lanka Standard Time)
- Postal code: NW 22094

Agrapatana is a village in the Nuwara Eliya District, Central Province, Sri Lanka. It is located 20 km (12 mi) from Talawakelle.

== Industry ==
The town is surrounded by numerous tea estates (including Holmwood Estate (Map), Sutton Division, Agra Uvah, Hauteville Estate and Glasgow Estate). The tea produced in Agrapatana is of high quality and typically commands a high price in the tea market.

== Population ==
Majority of people living in this area are Tamils however there are Sinhalese and Muslim ethnic communities as well. The Tamil people living in Agrapatana have their origin in South Indian State, Tamil Nadu who were brought to be employed as tea workers by British during the Colonial period (1815-1947).

== Education ==
Agrapatana Tamil Maha Vidyalayam and Sinhala Maha Vidyalaya are situated in the vicinity.

== See also ==
- List of towns in Central Province, Sri Lanka
