= Ockley railway station =

Railway station in Surrey, England

Coordinates: 51.152°N 0.336°W

Ockley
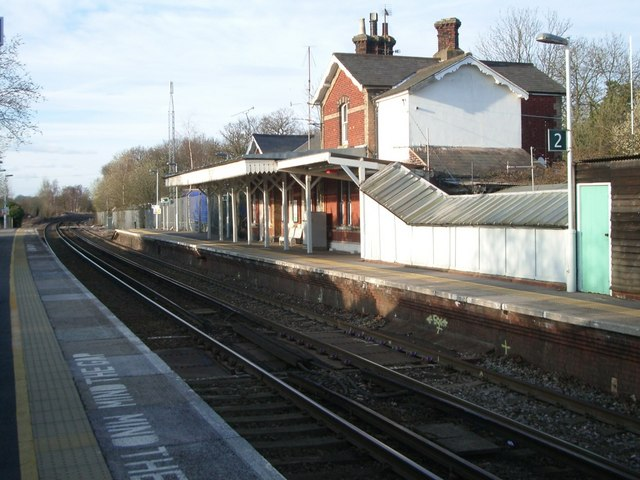

General information
- Location: Ockley, District of Mole Valley; England
- Grid reference: TQ164404
- Manager: Southern
- Platforms: 2

Other information
- Station code: OLY
- Classification: DfT category F2

History
- Opened: 1 May 1867

Passengers
- 2021/22: ▲25,258
- 2022/23: ▲29,096
- 2023/24: ▲29,208
- 2024/25: ▲34,176
- 2025/26: ▼29,792
Location
Notes
- Passenger statistics from the Office of Rail and Road

Ockley railway station serves the villages of Ockley and Capel in Surrey, England and is 1.4 miles (2.3 km) east of Ockley village and 0.5 miles (0.8 km) west of the village of Capel. The station is 29 miles 20 chains (47.1 km) from London Waterloo station (although London-bound trains run to Victoria). Ockley is managed by Southern which also provide the services.

== History ==
It opened as Ockley & Capel on 1 May 1867 as part of the London Brighton & South Coast Railway extension to Horsham. Its location, next to Le Steeres of Jayes Park brickworks (closed c 1914) and nearby Phorpres Works (now Clockhouse Works) allowed for substantial brickwork traffic for many years. Milk traffic was also important until the early 1930s when this trade was lost to road transport. Goods traffic declined slowly over the next 30 years ceasing finally in June 1962.

A signal box was provided at the station when it opened and was rebuilt with a 22-lever frame in 1905. The box was closed in 1965 and demolished two years later.

In 2000 the station was Grade II listed.

A great deal of further detail on the history of this station and the entire section of line between Dorking and Horsham can be found in John Harrod's Up The Dorking.

== Services ==
All services at Ockley are operated by Southern using Class 377 EMUs.

The typical off-peak service in trains per hour is:

- 1 tph to London Victoria via Sutton
- 1 tph to Horsham

There is no service on Saturday evenings (after approximately 18:30) or on Sundays.

Preceding station	National Rail	Following station
Holmwood	Southern Sutton & Mole Valley Lines Monday-Saturday only	Warnham

== Facilities ==
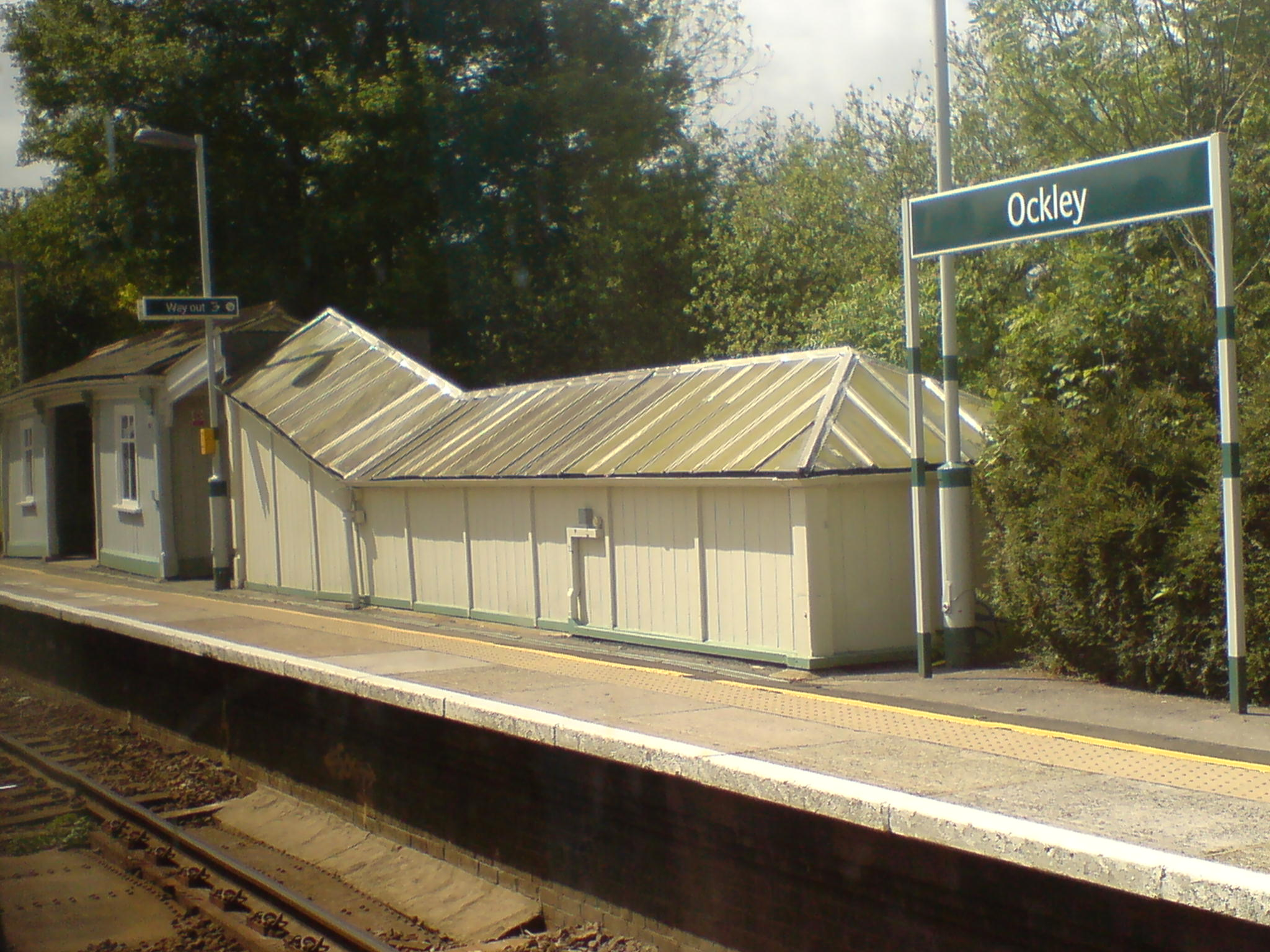
Ockley railway station platform 1 seen on the way to Horsham

The station has parking for 25 cars (two disabled spaces) in Station Approach, and 6 cycle spaces. There is no taxi rank. There is a payphone in front of the station building, and a ticket machine by the entrance to Platform 2.

== Journey times ==
Journey times are now around 80 minutes to London Victoria, compared to times of between only 51 and 60 minutes as recently as 1992.

== Sources ==
- Mitchell, Vic; Smith, Keith (1986). Epsom to Horsham. Southern Main Lines. Midhurst: Middleton Press. ISBN 0-906520-30-4.
