= Holmwood railway station =

Railway station in Surrey, England

Holmwood
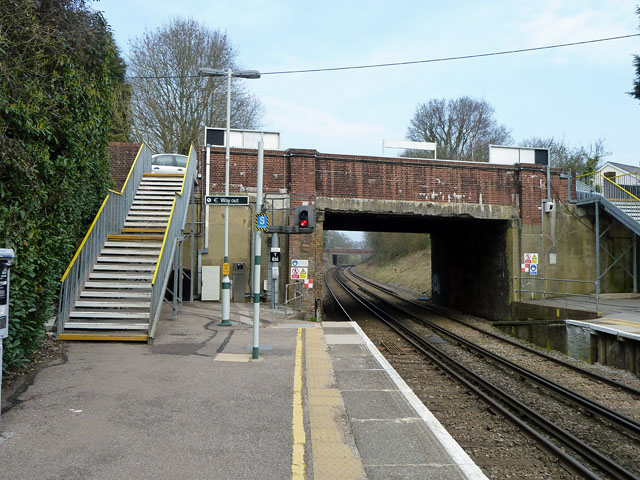

General information
- Location: Beare Green, District of Mole Valley; England
- Coordinates: 51.181°N 0.321°W
- Grid reference: TQ174437
- Manager: Southern
- Platforms: 2

Other information
- Station code: HLM
- Classification: DfT category F1

History
- Opened: 1 May 1867

Passengers
- 2021/22: ▲42,672
- 2022/23: ▲52,122
- 2023/24: ▼49,676
- 2024/25: ▲55,806
- 2025/26: ▲62,722
Location
Notes
- Passenger statistics from the Office of Rail and Road

Holmwood railway station serves the villages of Beare Green and South Holmwood in Surrey, England, on the Sutton and Mole Valley Lines between Dorking and Horsham, 27 miles 5 chains (43.6 km) from London Waterloo (although London-bound trains run to Victoria).

== History ==
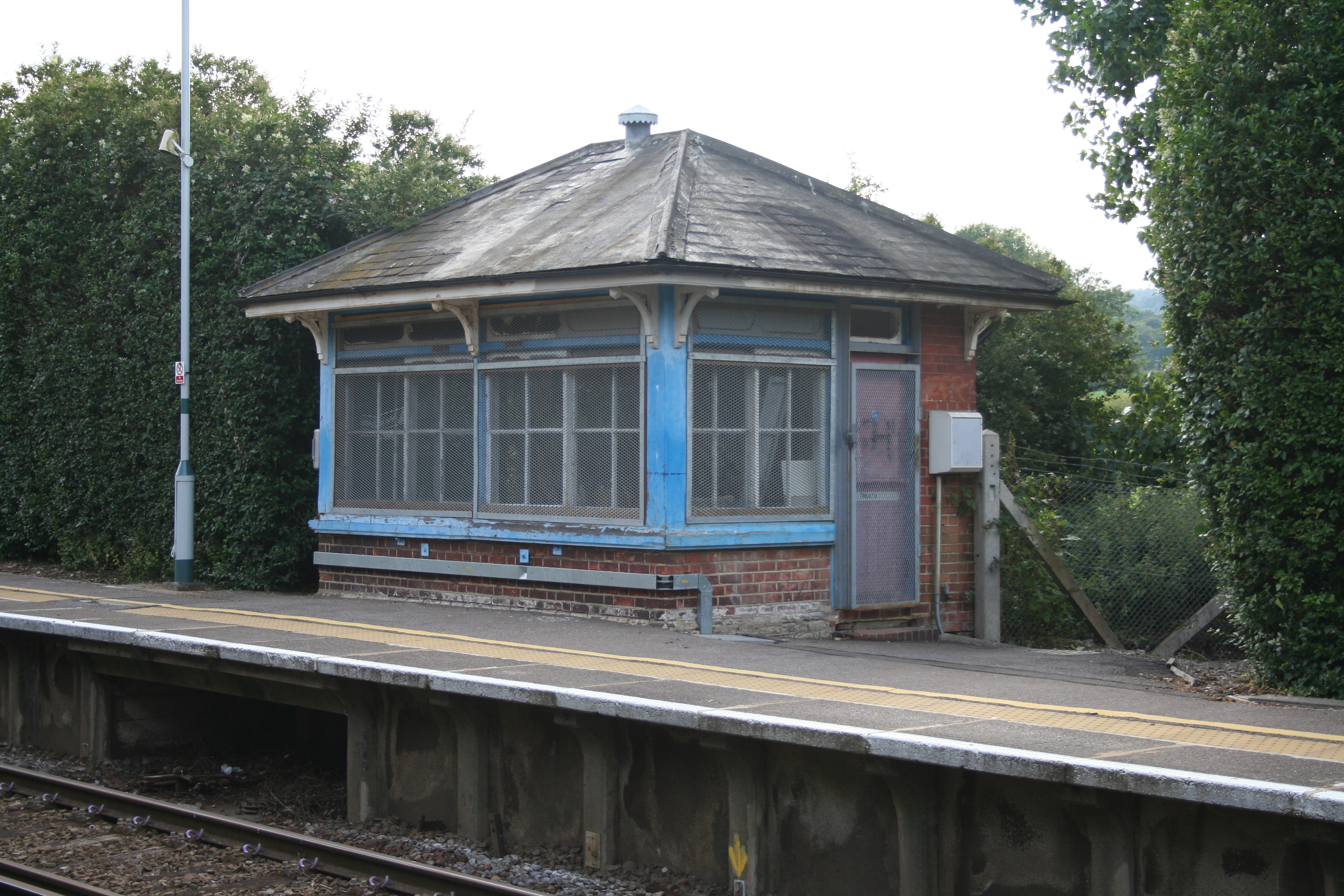
The Grade II listed signal box

The station opened in 1867 in what was the far north of the civil parish of Capel along the London, Brighton, and South Coast Railway line to Portsmouth.

For many years (until a revised timetable of 10 July 1967), Holmwood had two hourly services during the day in each direction:

- to and from Waterloo and Horsham
- to and from London Bridge (via Sutton and Tulse Hill) and Horsham.

Holmwood was a terminus for various additional trains to and from Waterloo.

Prior to 1963 the use of Holmwood as a terminus was implemented for much of the day. For example, a serious accident at Motspur Park on 6 Nov 1947 involved the 16:45 Southern Railway train from Holmwood to Waterloo. This service was withdrawn in 1963, the later 17:45 being the last of a series of hourly trains from Holmwood to Waterloo to be retained in the 1963 timetable. The accident in 1947 resulted from incorrect manual fog signalling when the driver of the Holmwood train was given permission to enter the junction at Motspur Park before the down Chessington train had cleared the junction, and before the signals and points were changed by the signal box.

The earlier timetables for services on the line from London Victoria to Horsham in 1905 and 1917 show that services to London Waterloo and London Bridge adhering to the Victorian service pattern from Holmwood, Ockley and Warnham being to London Victoria only.

The station's waiting shelter was repaired and redecorated in December 2020.

=== The Signal Box ===
The original 1877 signal box remains on the London bound platform although now disused. The signal box is Grade II listed.[1]

== Facilities ==
The station is unstaffed and has no ticket office although there is a self-service ticket machine on the London bound platform for ticket purchases. Both platforms have departure boards, shelters and modern help points. There are no car parking facilities at the station although there is a small bicycle storage facility.

== Services ==
All services at Holmwood are operated by Southern using Class 377 EMUs.

The typical off-peak service in trains per hour is:

- 1 tph to London Victoria via Sutton
- 1 tph to Horsham

There is no service on Saturday evenings (after approximately 18:30) or on Sundays.

Preceding station	National Rail	Following station
Dorking	Southern Sutton & Mole Valley Lines Monday-Saturday only	Ockley
