= Capel, Surrey =

Village and civil parish in Surrey, England

Coordinates: 51.154°N 0.321°W

Capel
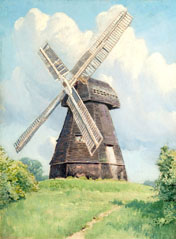
- Shiremark Mill

- Location within Surrey
- Area: 26.14 km^{2} (10.09 sq mi)
- Population: 3,832 (Civil Parish 2011)
  - Density: 147/km^{2} (380/sq mi)
- OS grid reference: TQ1740
- Civil parish: Capel
- District: Mole Valley
- Shire county: Surrey
- Region: South East
- Country: England
- Sovereign state: United Kingdom
- Post town: Dorking
- Postcode district: RH5
- Dialling code: 01306
- Police: Surrey
- Fire: Surrey
- Ambulance: South East Coast
- UK Parliament: Dorking and Horley

Capel (/ˈkeɪpəl/) is a village and civil parish in southern Surrey, England. It is equidistant between Dorking and Horsham – about 5 miles (8.0 km) away. Around Capel, to the west, skirts the A24 road. Capel is approximately 2.5 miles (4.0 km) north of the West Sussex border, 26 miles (42 km) south of London and 12 miles (19 km) southeast of Guildford and is in the Mole Valley district. The village is in the north of a landscape called the Weald, meaning forest, which forms a significant minority of the land today, particularly towards the Greensand Ridge.

== History ==
=== Anstiebury Camp ===
Within the parish in Coldharbour there is one Scheduled Ancient Monument, a large Iron Age hillfort named Anstiebury Camp evidencing early occupation. Multivallate, defined by boundaries consisting of two or more lines of closely set earthworks, this relatively late hill fort constructed in the second and first centuries BC covers approximately 5 hectares (12 acres). There is a triple rampart wall to the north and south-east where the ground is fairly level, a double terrace on the west and south where the ground is much steeper, and a single line of defences to the north-east. The entrance is mid-way along the eastern side, defined by a wide break in the main rampart. Trenches dug in the southeast, the entrance, and a few other investigations in 1972-3 revealed that the front of the main rampart had been set against and into the edge of the associated ditch and revetted with massive, irregular blocks of sandstone. The conclusion was that the purpose was to resist sling warfare due to the form and width, with rounded pebbles, foreign to the Greensand Ridge, being frequently found in the areas excavated. The archaeologist also considered that the entrance and the defences to the north of it were never completed, possibly linked with the deliberate demolition of the main rampart revetment, and possibly coinciding with Caesar's invasions of Britain. The site was re-occupied in the Roman period, probably at least a century after it was originally abandoned.

=== Medieval period ===
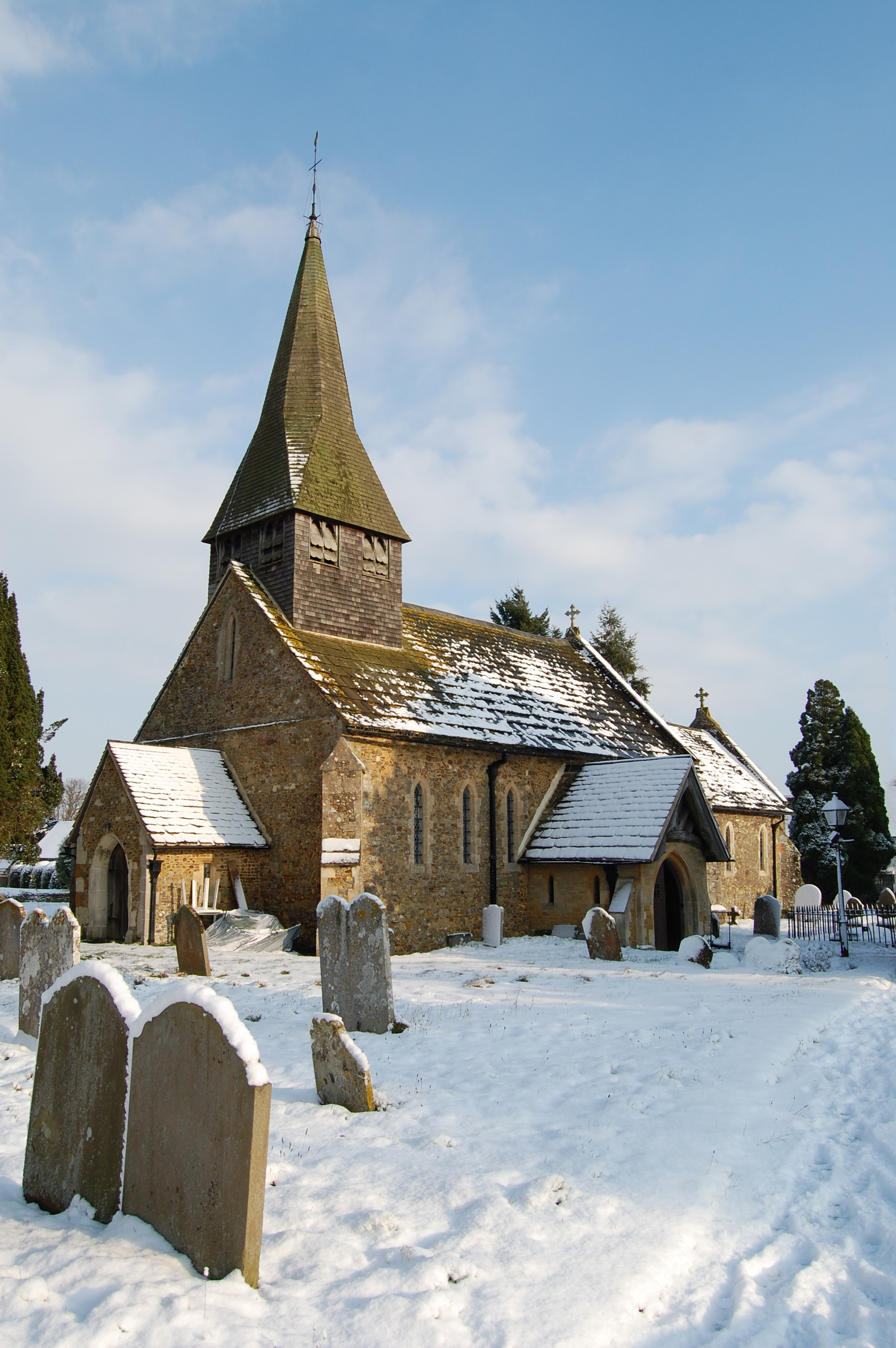
Church of St John the Baptist

Capel in the Middle Ages developed only enough to have a chapel of ease, as a chapelry within the parish of Dorking. The chapel, which gives its name to the village, was first mentioned in a confirmation (1129–71) of a grant to the Priory of Lewes by the Earls of Warenne, consisting of 'Ecclesiam de Dorking cum Capella de la Wachna.'

The original settlement of Capel consisted of approximately thirty farms, most of which still exist today bearing the names of their tenants in the early 14th century. Timbers in some of the farmhouses have also been dated to 14th century.

=== 19th Century ===
By 1848 there were 989 inhabitants over 5,522 acres (2,235 ha), of which 105 acres (42 ha) were common or waste. Lewis summarised Capel in that year as:

The lands are principally arable, producing good crops of wheat and oats, and the soil is also well adapted to the growth of timber. Broom Hall [sic] here is an elegant edifice, on the south-eastern confines of Leith Hill. The living is a donative [not a rectory], in the patronage of Charles Webb, with a net income of £84: the tithes have been commuted for £610.

The 13th century church, pictured, was enlarged in 1836, paid by James Shudi Broadwood of the piano-making family from nearby Lyne House and was restored in 1858 by architect Henry Woodyer, who installed a spiral staircase and bell cage in the same style as Buckland's church.

=== Friends Meeting House ===
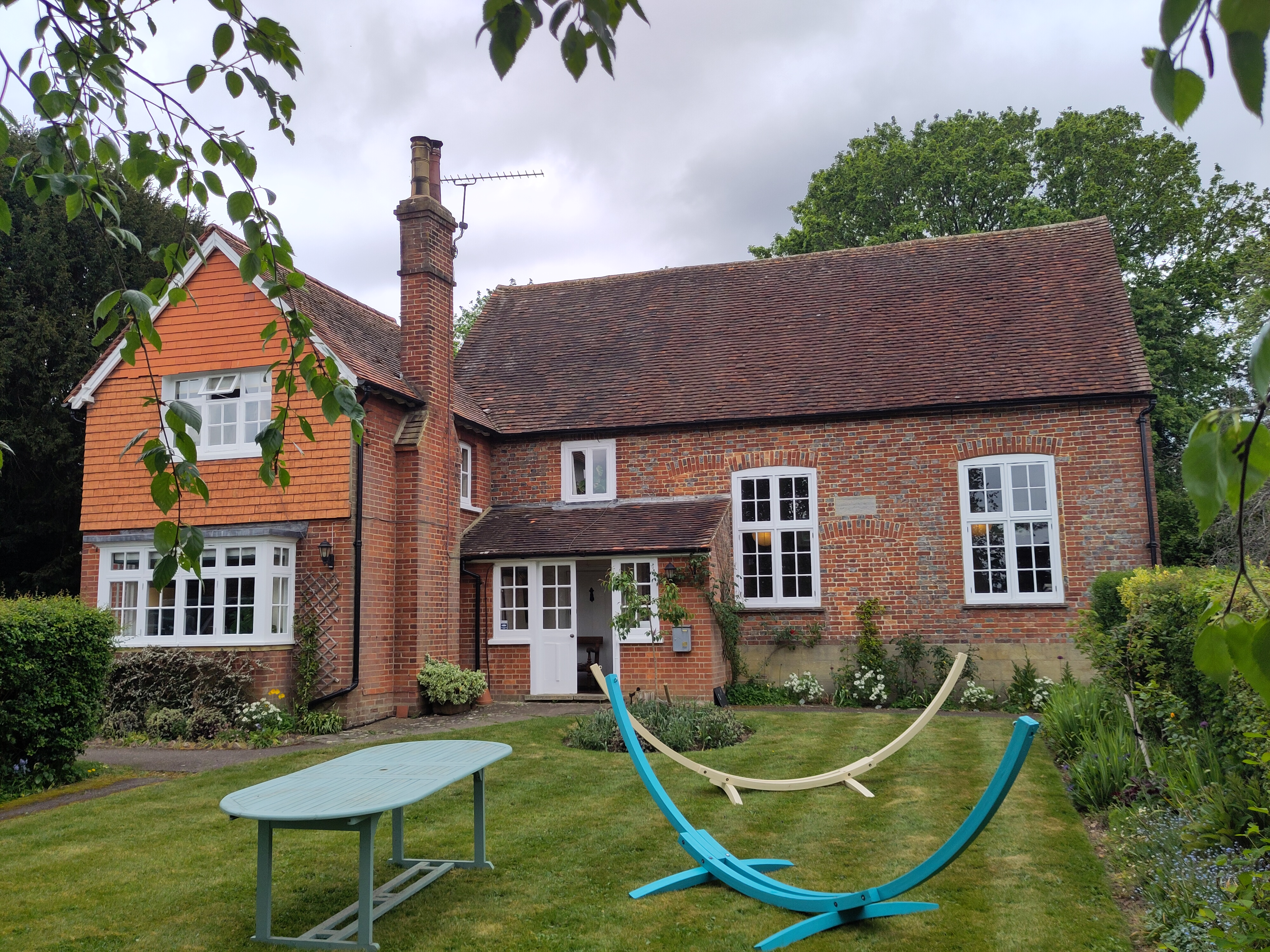
Original eighteenth century Meeting House on the right, cottage accommodation added on left

In the 17th and 18th centuries, Capel was the centre of a Quaker community which met at the houses of the local Bax family. The Quaker Sussex Quarterly Meeting recorded the fact that Thomas Patching "who then lived at Bonwick's Place in Ifield" met with George Fox, and then later "there was settled the first Monthly Meeting that was set up in this county .... and has since been removed to the house of Richard Bax at Capel in Surrey by reason of Thomas Patching's removing from that place". It is known that George Fox visited Surrey in 1668 and held a Meeting at Pleystowe Farm, Capel, the home of Richard Bax. The Friends Meeting House, built 1724, is in the main conservation area of the village; it is also a listed building.

=== Brickmaking in Capel district ===
The clay soil of the Upper Weald on which Capel lies has a rich history of brick-making. A small brickyard owned by the Lee - Steere family existed next to Ockley and Capel station until the early 1920s. The manager's house named Arundel Cottage still stands. To the south and also adjacent to the railway is the derelict Auclaye Brickworks. The yard which ceased working sometime in the late 1980s was subject to a proposal in 2017 to reopen and extract minerals. This was rejected and the site is subject to a Geological Conservation Review

The largest brickyard in the area was The Clock House Brick Company Ltd., opened to the south of Capel in 1933 to exploit a rich seam of clay. It was for seventy years a major source of employment for local inhabitants. In 1941 the majority of shares were acquired by The London Brick Company who expanded quarrying of the clay to accommodate improved production methods. The yard specialised in the production of the dense Phorpres brick. The London Brick Company was acquired by Hanson plc in 1984. They opted to refit the works producing bricks under the Butterley and Capel names. By 2000, the Clock House brickyard was making around 42 million bricks per year.

The Great Recession temporarily decimated the building materials industry. A sudden slump in housing prices meant that house-building ground almost to a halt and demand for bricks plummeted. In March 2009, Hanson announced a 'phased closure programme' which began later that month and led to the loss of 61 jobs. The works closed in 2009 after which the site was allowed to deteriorate.

== Amenities ==
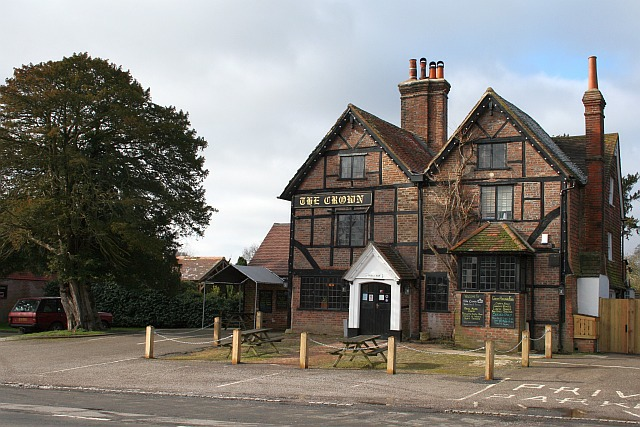
The Crown Inn

The historic Crown Inn is the village's sole surviving public house.

The area is in the Green Belt surrounding London and has two conservation areas, one in Coldharbour and one in Capel itself.

Both Capel and Beare Green have a village hall; each of them puts on a monthly cinema showing, and has many other users and groups

Beare Green has a train station with direct services to London Victoria, Holmwood railway station, in the main, new part of the village West of the A24, and a primary school in old Beare Green to the East of the A24, but has no pubs.

=== Religion ===
The Anglican parish church of St John The Baptist is a grade II listed building, as are eight nearby buildings in the Capel Conservation Area, A Friends Meeting House serves Quakers, who have been in Capel since the 17th century.

There is a lively, fairly informal monthly church service in Beare Green Village Hall on the first Sunday of each month, at 11:15, known as Café Church, suitable for (and attended by) all ages. Average attendance is about 30, peak so far being 60.

=== Education ===
A village school was built in 1826 and enlarged in 1872. Capel today has Scott-Broadwood Church of England Infant School and a pre-school. So does the old part of Beare Green, east of the A24.

== Localities ==
=== Beare Green ===
Beare Green (/ˈbɛər/) is a separate locality also within the same A24 bypass with a population of 1,323, made up of 607 households. It is located about 1 mile (1.6 km) north of Capel; Beare Green's roundabout, to its north, is at one end of the A29 road to Bognor Regis on the English Channel. Holmwood railway station is within Beare Green, and is considerably south of South, Mid and North Holmwood, so that it appears to be mis-named. It is a station towards London on the Mole Valley Line.

Older maps label Beare Green as being where the Duke's Head pub and Weald School are, on the East side of the A24 dual carriageway. This is the original location of Beare Green. This area now has 100 older houses and 120 mobile homes [in 2 parks on Horsham Road], that lie to the South and East. The larger part of Beare Green, that is signed as Beare Green from the A24 dual carriageway, sits to the West of the A24 and now has 400 homes and all the shops plus the railway station (mis-named Holmwood Station), the village hall and the new playing area.

In February 2020, Mole Valley District Council proposed a strategic development of 480 homes on Green Belt land to the South of the settlement. A development of 55 homes to the north of the village was also proposed. The proposals were in Mole Valley District Council's Draft Local Plan which went out for public consultation in February 2020.

Field Hockey player, and Olympic Gold Medalist, Stephen Batchelor was born in Beare Green on 22 June 1961. 1996 Grand National winner, Rough Quest was trained for the race by Terry Casey at Henfold House Stables, in a farm close to Beare Green in Capel.

=== Coldharbour ===
Coldharbour is the locality within the civil parish 3 miles (4.8 km) to the northwest. It is situated on the southern and eastern slopes of Leith Hill in the Surrey Hills Area of Outstanding Natural Beauty; Leith Hill is the second highest point in southeast England and lies on the Greensand Ridge that runs from near Hindhead to the south of Maidstone, Kent. Coldharbour has a conservation area along its highest roads with two listed buildings. Christ Church is a chapel built in 1848. Members of the Wedgwood and Vaughan Williams families lived at Leith Hill Place.

Broome Hall near Coldharbour is a Grade II listed stone mansion, built for the publisher Andrew Spottiswoode. It was finished around 1830 and subsequently owned by the Liberal politician Frederick Pennington and writer Henry Du Pré Labouchère. From 1946 to 1969, it was a novitiate house for the White Fathers and in 1971 it became the home of the actor Oliver Reed.

Europa Oil & Gas Ltd submitted in 2008 a planning application to Surrey County Council to explore for oil and gas (Note: Summarised on 13 July 2012 by opponents' counsel at the, on appeal by the developer, public inquiry in Dorking as "An exploratory oil well, entailing site clearance, a compound, fencing, a 35m-high drilling rig, car park, flare pit and more besides, not to mention hundreds if not thousands of HGV [movements]) (Note: The Parish Council were informed of the date of announcement of the Inquiry's result into proposed Oil and Gas works - Monday 15 October.) in Coldharbour but this was rejected by the Planning Inspectorate based upon a public inquiry in October 2012.

== Demography and housing ==
The large civil parish at the 2001 census had a population of 3,624, which increased by 208 over the following 10 years. (Note: At the same census, the census ward Capel, Leigh and Newdigate had a population of 3,882.)

2011 Census Homes
Output area	Detached	Semi-detached	Terraced	Flats and apartments	Caravans/temporary/mobile homes	shared between households
(Civil Parish)	547	477	256	251	117	0

The average level of accommodation in the region composed of detached houses was 28%, the average that was apartments was 22.6%.

2011 Census Key Statistics
Output area	Population	Households	% Owned outright	% Owned with a loan	hectares
(Civil Parish)	3,832	1,648	35.4%	36.1%	2,614

The proportion of households in the civil parish who owned their home outright compares to the regional average of 35.1%. The proportion who owned their home with a loan compares to the regional average of 32.5%. The remaining % is made up of rented dwellings (plus a negligible % of households living rent-free).

== Transport ==
Aside from the A24 road the village is served by Ockley railway station - considerably closer to Capel than Ockley itself as it was sponsored by a peer of Ockley, on the Mole Valley Line between Dorking and Horsham with direct services to London Victoria station and a change of train in Epsom possible for the service to London Waterloo.

A bus service runs along this main route to Dorking and Horsham.

== Notes and references ==
notes
