= List of places of worship in Mole Valley =

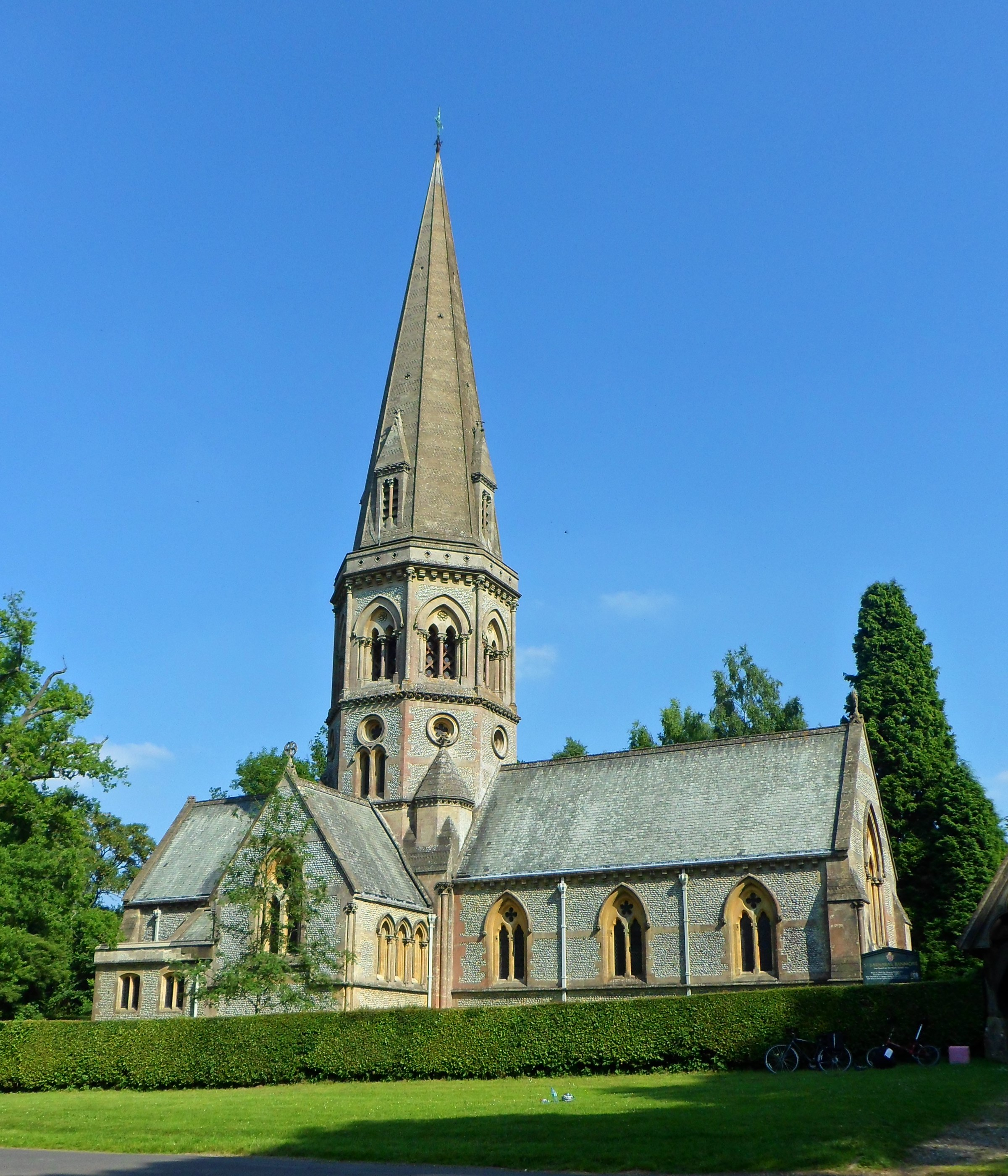
St Barnabas' Church at Ranmore Common (1859, by George Gilbert Scott) is one of several Anglican churches built in Mole Valley in the Victorian era.

The district of Mole Valley has more than 70 current and former places of worship: 56 buildings are in use by various Christian denominations and other religions, and a further 16 are no longer in religious use but survive in other uses or—in two cases—as ruins. Mole Valley is one of 11 local government districts in the English county of Surrey—a small inland county south of London which is characterised by small market towns, ancient villages and 20th-century suburbs.

The latest census results show that the majority of residents are Christian. Dorking, one of the district's two main towns, has a Muslim community centre and mosque, but all other places of worship serve Christian denominations. The Church of England—the country's Established Church—is represented by the largest number of churches. The Roman Catholic Church and the larger Protestant Nonconformist groups such as Methodists, Baptists and the United Reformed Church each have several buildings and congregations of their own. Quakers, Christian Scientists, Plymouth Brethren and other smaller groups also have their own chapels and meeting rooms, mostly in Dorking and the other main town of Leatherhead.

English Heritage has awarded listed status to 29 current and three former places of worship in the district. A building is defined as "listed" when it is placed on a statutory register of buildings of "special architectural or historic interest" in accordance with the Planning (Listed Buildings and Conservation Areas) Act 1990. The Department for Culture, Media and Sport, a Government department, is responsible for this; English Heritage, a non-departmental public body, acts as an agency of the department to administer the process and advise the department on relevant issues. There are three grades of listing status. Grade I, the highest, is defined as being of "exceptional interest"; Grade II* is used for "particularly important buildings of more than special interest"; and Grade II, the lowest, is used for buildings of "special interest". As of February 2001, there were 5 Grade I-listed buildings, 44 with Grade II* status and 919 Grade II-listed buildings in Mole Valley.

== Overview of the district ==
Mole Valley is in the centre of Surrey.

Mole Valley covers a 25,832-acre (10,454 ha) area in the centre of Surrey and had a population of 85,375 at the time of the United Kingdom Census 2011. It is one of 11 local government areas in the county, which lies immediately south of London in southeast England. The main centres of population are Dorking, centrally located within the district, and Leatherhead to the north, which is part of a continuous urban area incorporating Ashtead, Fetcham and Great Bookham. The M25 motorway runs through them, several railway lines provide connections in all directions, and Gatwick Airport is just beyond the southeastern boundary of the district. Nevertheless, it is mostly rural—more than 90% of the land is countryside, much of which is covered by the Surrey Hills AONB—and there are dozens of small villages. Most have at least one place of worship—usually an Anglican parish church, and in some cases other chapels or meeting houses serving the Protestant Nonconformist denominations which grew in importance from the 18th century. The main towns have a wider range of places of worship: Plymouth Brethren, Christian Scientists, the Elim Pentecostal Church and Jehovah's Witnesses are all represented, for example. Roman Catholics are served by large churches in Dorking and Leatherhead and smaller modern buildings in Ashtead and Fetcham. The Methodist church in Leatherhead recorded in the Methodist Statistical Returns published in 1947 (Note: The statistical return was compiled between 1940 and 1947 with the aim of documenting all Methodist chapels extant at that time: their location, previous affiliation prior to the Methodist Union of 1932, capacity, building materials and similar details.) survives, but the chapel at Capel is no longer in use and Dorking's Methodist chapel has been demolished; the congregation now share St Martin's Anglican church.

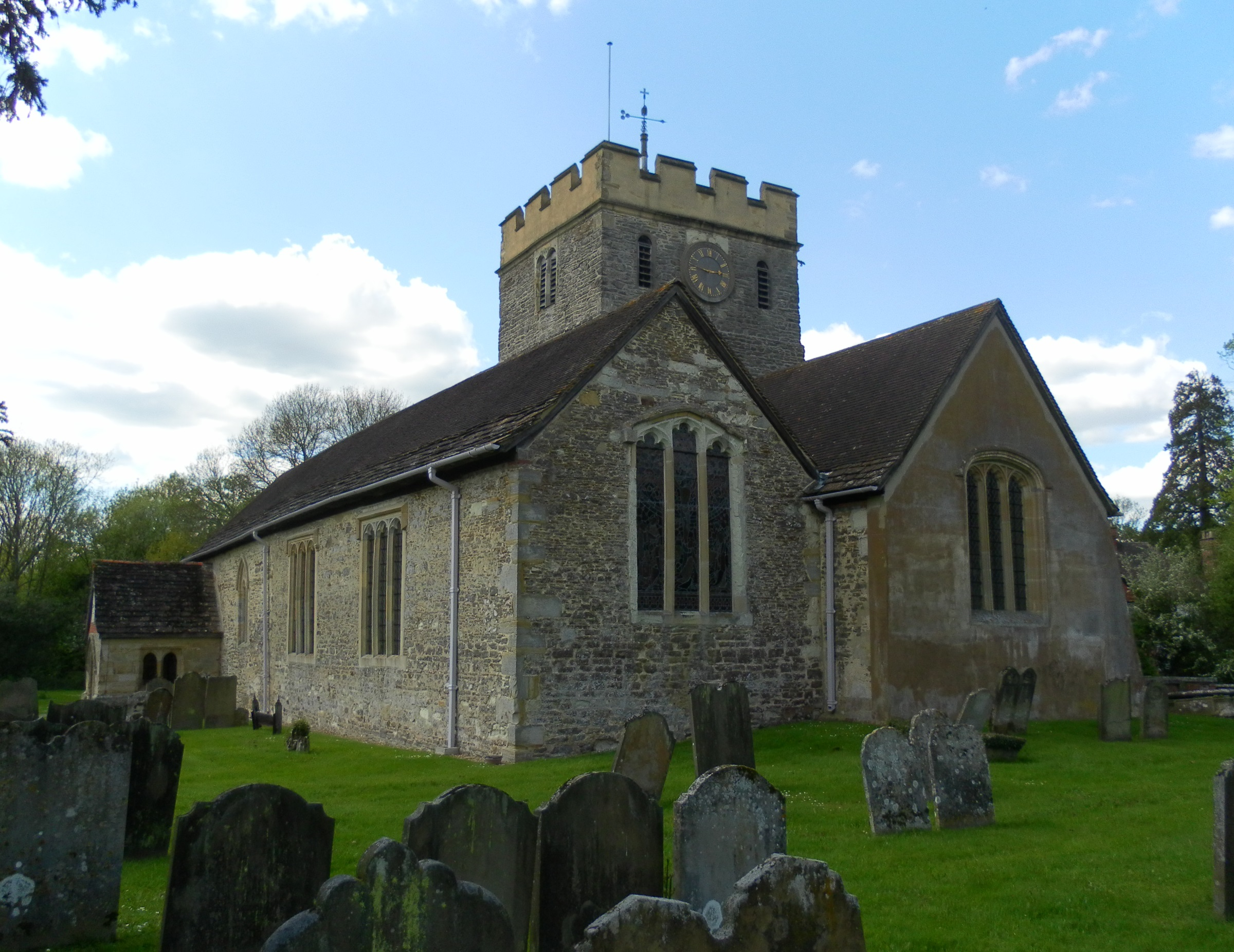
At St Nicholas' Church, Charlwood, the right-hand section is Norman while the south aisle to the left dates from the 13th century.

The oldest churches in the district have Saxon origins (i.e. 10th- or 11th-century); examples include Betchworth, (Note: In this section, when only the name of a village is shown, the Anglican parish church is being referred to.) Fetcham and Wotton, each of which retain fragmentary evidence of this era. (Even older material in the form of reused Roman rubble is visible at St Giles, Ashtead and at Fetcham.) Norman churches extended or altered in the 13th century are common and across the county; in Mole Valley, Charlwood is a good example. Work from later centuries generally consisted of extensions and rebuilds, although one new church was provided at Leigh in the 15th century. Victorian restoration affected many churches, sometimes to the extent of completely rebuilding them (as at Buckland and Capel, both by Henry Woodyer).

Along with an enthusiasm for restoration, another characteristic of the area in the Victorian era was the provision of chapels of ease in the extensive ancient parishes and the formation of new parishes from parts of others. Dorking expanded greatly in the 19th century, and the large parish of St Martin's Church was divided up as new churches were opened in the south of the town (St Paul, 1857) and at nearby North Holmwood (St John the Evangelist, 1875) and Pixham (St Mary the Virgin, 1903). Similarly, Leatherhead's ancient parish church was supplemented by All Saints in the north of the town in 1889; St George was built in 1905 near Ashtead railway station as a chapel of ease to St Giles at Ashtead Park; and St Margaret, distant from Ockley village, had a chapel of ease (St John) on the village green from 1872 until its closure in the late 20th century. In the same era, new churches were built in villages which had none before, and parishes were created for them. Examples include Brockham Green (1848; originally in Betchworth parish), Coldharbour (1848; a parish was carved out of four others) and Westcott (1850; originally in Dorking parish). Elsewhere, ruinous old churches were rebuilt or restored at Buckland, Headley, Oakwood Hill and other villages. Churches built for specific purposes include the landmark hilltop St Barnabas' Church at Ranmore Common (1859; formerly in Great Bookham parish), provided for the Denbies Estate's owners and employees, and Holy Trinity at Forest Green (1897; formerly in Abinger parish)—built not only to serve villagers but to act as a memorial to a man who was killed in an accident.

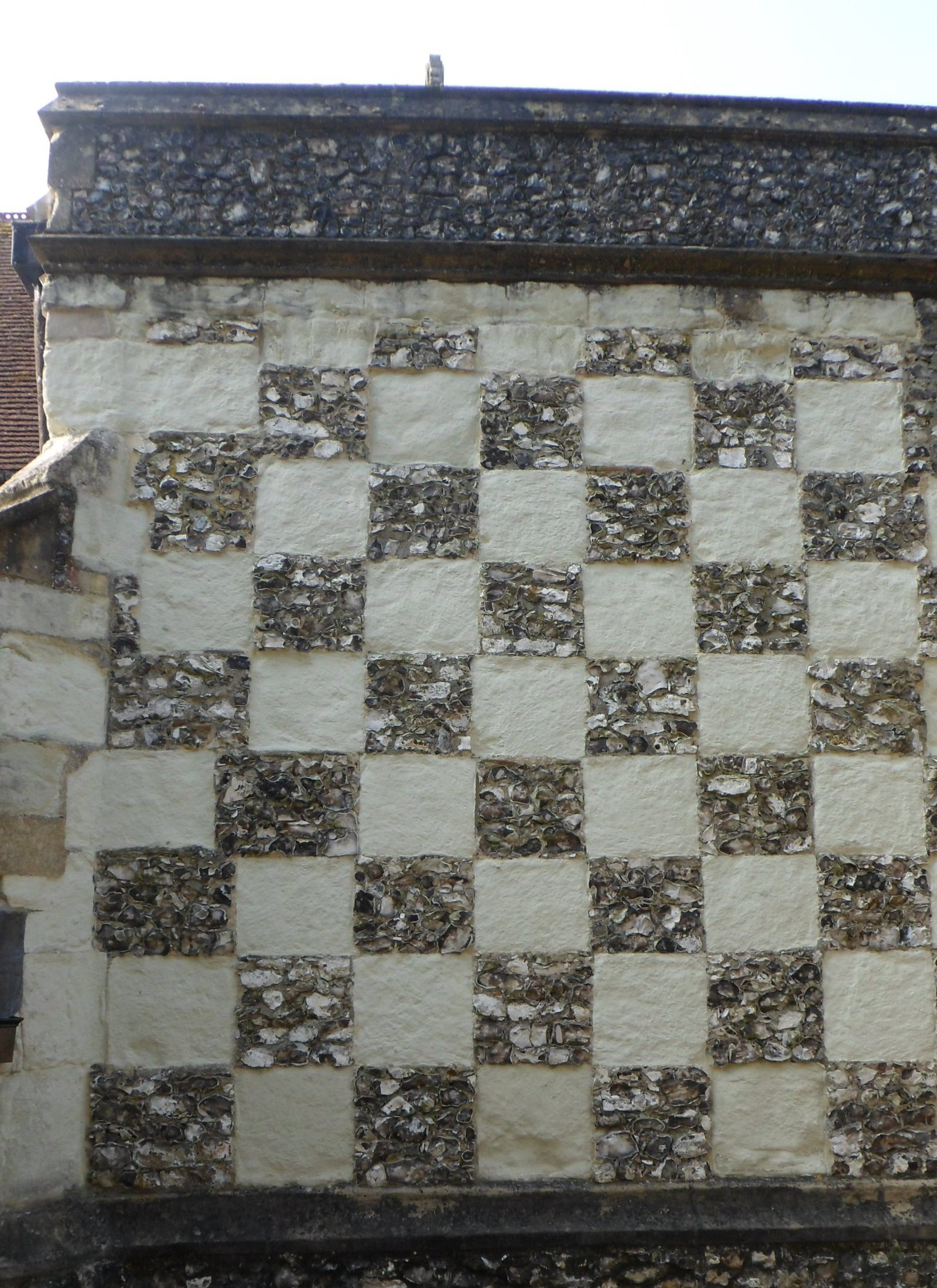
The wall of this side chapel at St Michael's Church, Mickleham is built with locally quarried flint and clunch arranged in a checkerboard pattern, in an homage to the flag of Surrey.

Building materials vary, but many churches are built of local stone. Brownish Bargate stone from the southwest of the county—"tougher, coarser and more durable than Reigate Stone" (also known as firestone)—was used at Buckland, Capel and the Roman Catholic church in Dorking. Among the churches with firestone walls are Brockham (in which it is combined with limestone dressings, giving a polychromatic effect) and Oakwood Hill. Also common, especially on the oldest churches, is flint. This was usually used on its own; the chequerboard pattern of flint and stone squares common in other parts of England is seen at only two Surrey churches, both in Mole Valley: Leatherhead and Mickleham. At the latter, clunch is the other part of the chequerboard pattern. Clunch is also used at Betchworth, along with chalk; and that material (quarried extensively in east Surrey) is also found in the walls of the church at Oakwood Hill and internally at Fetcham and Great Bookham. Ashlar formed from the soft, easily workable stone of the Upper Greensand beds, was commonly used for dressings, quoins and similar. Horsham Stone, a type of sandstone, is often used as a tiling material on roofs. Some places of worship are entirely different in materials and origins, though. A converted cattle shed donated by Sir Benjamin Collins Brodie, 1st Baronet of Broome Park serves as a gospel hall in Betchworth; a timber-framed barn in Westhumble is now used as a chapel of ease to nearby Mickleham's parish church; and Providence Chapel at Charlwood was transported to its isolated site in 1816 from Horsham, where it had been used as an officers' mess during the Napoleonic Wars. The remarkable building, which with its open verandah and white-painted wooden walls "would not be out of place in the remotest part of East Kentucky" in the words of Ian Nairn and Nikolaus Pevsner, served Independent Calvinists and Strict Baptists at various times, but As of 2022 is up for sale.

Although most of the former places of worship in the district closed because of falling attendances, the Hampstead Road Church faced the opposite problem. Built for Plymouth Brethren in 1863, it later developed an Open Brethren/Evangelical character, and by the early 21st century the congregation had outgrown the chapel. Under the name The Nower Church they began worshipping in a school in July 2010, and the old chapel was deregistered in November 2011.

== Religious affiliation ==
According to the United Kingdom Census 2011, 85,375 people lived in the district of Mole Valley. Of these, 64.3% identified themselves as Christian, 0.78% were Muslim, 0.66% were Hindu, 0.39% were Buddhist, 0.25% were Jewish, 0.1% were Sikh, 0.39% followed another religion, 25.2% claimed no religious affiliation and 7.9% did not state their religion. The proportion of Christians was much higher than the 59.38% in England as a whole; and the proportions of people who followed other religions or no religion or who did not answer this census question were similar to those recorded in England overall (0.43%, 24.74% and 7.18% respectively). Islam, Judaism, Hinduism, Sikhism and Buddhism had a much lower following in the district than in the country overall: in 2011, 5.02% of people in England were Muslim, 1.52% were Hindu, 0.79% were Sikh, 0.49% were Jewish and 0.45% were Buddhist.

== Administration ==
=== Anglican churches ===
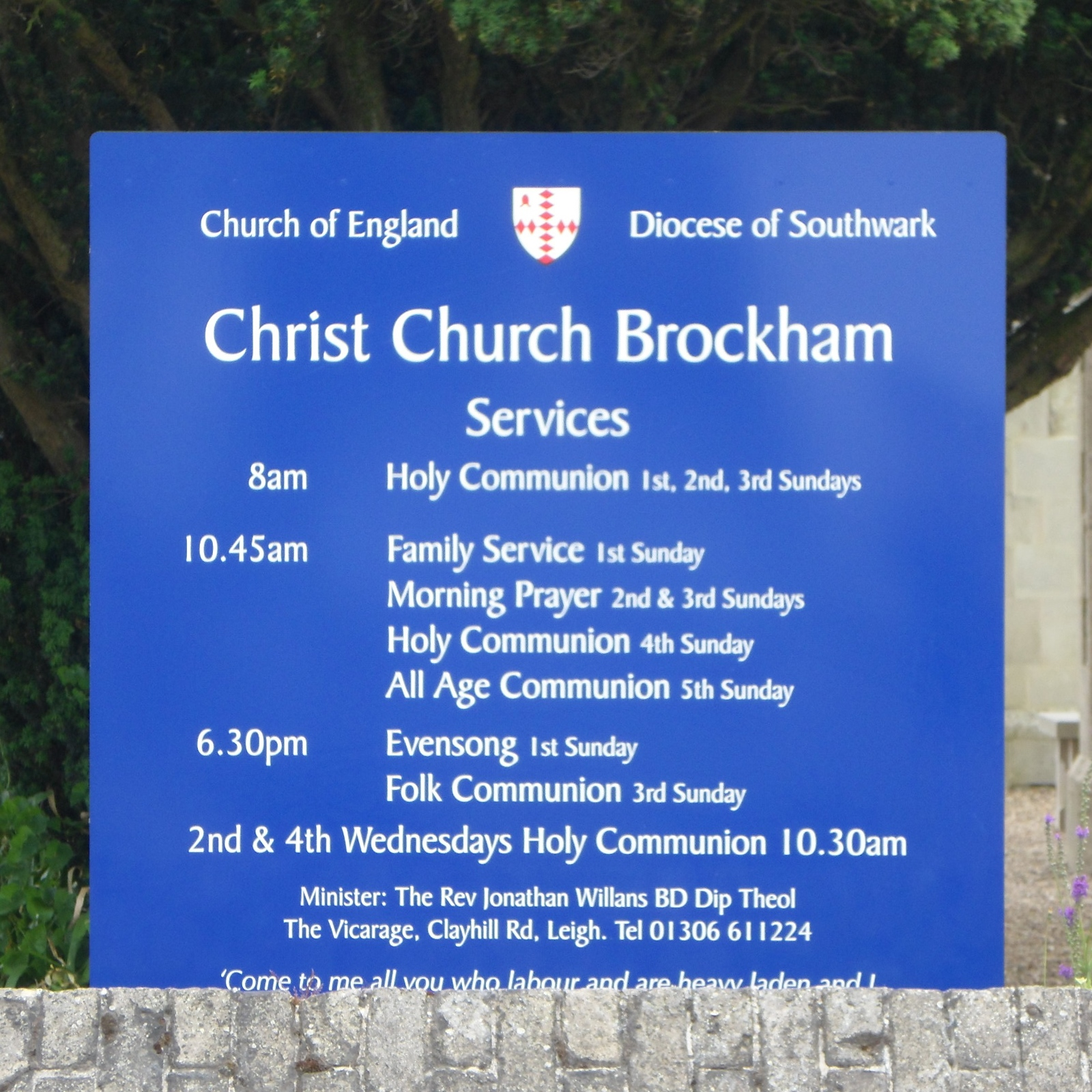
Churches in the Anglican Diocese of Southwark include Christ Church at Brockham Green.

Administratively, Mole Valley district is split between two Church of England dioceses: the Anglican Diocese of Southwark, the seat of which is Southwark Cathedral in London, and the Diocese of Guildford, whose cathedral is at Guildford in Surrey. The Diocese of Southwark's Reigate Deanery, part of the Reigate Archdeaconry and the Croydon Episcopal Area, administers the churches at Betchworth, Brockham Green, Buckland, Charlwood and Leigh. The churches in Guildford Diocese are covered by three deaneries—Dorking, Epsom and Leatherhead—all of which are in turn part of the Archdeaconry of Dorking. The churches at Abinger Common, Capel, Coldharbour, Dorking (St Martin and St Paul), Forest Green, Newdigate, North Holmwood, Oakwood Hill, (Note: The hamlet and church are also known as Oakwood, Okewood and Okewood Hill. A book on the church's history states that "both spellings are correct: Okewood [is] the ancient way and Oakwood the more modern".) Ockley, Pixham, Ranmore Common, South Holmwood, Westcott and Wotton are in Dorking Deanery; Box Hill and Headley are covered by Epsom Deanery; and Leatherhead Deanery administers Ashtead's two churches (St George and St Giles), the two in Leatherhead (St Mary and St Nicholas and All Saints) and those at Fetcham, Great Bookham, Little Bookham, Mickleham and Westhumble.

=== Roman Catholic churches ===
All four Roman Catholic churches in Mole Valley—at Ashtead, Dorking, Fetcham and Leatherhead—are administered by Epsom Deanery, one of 13 deaneries in the Roman Catholic Diocese of Arundel and Brighton, whose cathedral is at Arundel in West Sussex.

=== Other denominations ===
Crossways Community Baptist Church in Dorking is part of the Gatwick Network of the South Eastern Baptist Association, and Ashtead and Bookham Baptist Churches are within the association's Guildford Network. Mount Zion Chapel, a Strict Baptist place of worship in Leatherhead, is affiliated with the Gospel Standard movement; and Dorking Baptist Chapel (originally Strict Baptist) maintains links with GraceNet UK, an association of Reformed Evangelical Christian churches and organisations. The Methodist congregations meeting in Leatherhead and in the shared Anglican and Methodist church in Dorking are covered by the eight-church Dorking & Horsham Methodist Circuit. The Southern Synod, one of 13 synods of the United Reformed Church in the United Kingdom, administers that denomination's churches at Dorking, Great Bookham and Leatherhead.

== Current places of worship ==
Current places of worship
Name	Image	Location	Denomination/ Affiliation	Grade	Notes	Refs
St James's Church (More images)		Abinger Common; 51.2020°N 0.4055°W	Anglican	II*	This typical Surrey Vernacular church was damaged by bombs in World War II and fire in 1964. Frederick Etchells restored it in 1950 after the war damage. The nave and chancel are early-12th- and early-13th-century respectively. "The best modern stained glass in the county" (to Ian Nairn) is in the east window; it was designed by Lawrence Lee in 1967.	
St Giles' Church (More images)		Ashtead; 51.3087°N 0.2900°W	Anglican	II*	Ashtead's ancient church stands in Ashtead Park and dates from several periods. Some 12th- and 13th-century work (incorporating Roman brickwork) remains; a side chapel, now lost, dated from the 15th century; the tower was added in the following century; and more work took place in 1862 and 1891. The "very effective" 16th-century stained glass in the east window was acquired from the Herkenrode Abbey in Belgian Limburg.	
St George's Church (More images)		Ashtead; 51.3143°N 0.3085°W	Anglican	–	This was built in the Lower Ashtead area near Ashtead railway station in 1905 to serve as a chapel of ease to St Giles' Church. It is a "very simple brick" building with a "good, honest" character, designed by the firm of Sir A.W. Blomfield and Son (Arthur Blomfield himself had died by this time).	
Ashtead Baptist Church (More images)		Ashtead; 51.3129°N 0.3113°W	Baptist	–	The first Baptist chapel in the village dated from 1895. The present church, originally known as the Free Church, was registered for marriages in April 1924.	
St Michael's Church (More images)		Ashtead; 51.3125°N 0.3011°W	Roman Catholic	–	Ashtead's Roman Catholic church was built in 1967 to the design of Peter French and was registered for worship and marriages in October of that year, replacing a predecessor on the same site which had been registered in August 1948. There are clerestory windows around the octagonal brick-built walls, a prominent canopied entrance and a sloping fascia. The interior is wood-panelled.	
St Michael's Church (More images)		Betchworth; 51.2337°N 0.2674°W	Anglican	I	The large, mostly mid-13th-century church in this village was greatly altered in 1851 by E.C. Hakewill, who replaced the old crossing tower with a square-topped corner tower, and again in 1870. Some Saxon and later 11th-century work survives, though, such as a reset window in the new tower. The materials are chalk, clunch, limestone and Bath Stone. Monuments include one to Sir Benjamin Collins Brodie.	
St Andrew's Church		Box Hill; 51.2502°N 0.2888°W	Anglican	–	A hall provided by sisters Phoebe and Margery Brodie was used for worship between 1938 and 1969, when the present building was completed. Brian Spiller, the builder, and most of the workers were local. Building work started on 24 April 1968, and the dedication ceremony (led by the Bishop of Kingston) was on 1 February 1969. The church was linked to that at Brockham.	
Christ Church (More images)		Brockham; 51.2315°N 0.2857°W	Anglican	II	Benjamin Ferrey's cruciform Early English Gothic Revival church is a landmark in the village. The exterior combines limestone and firestone; this polychromatic effect gives way to a "simple, honest interior". Features include a carved reredos (1885) and an ornate stone font. The tower is centrally placed over the crossing.	
St Mary the Virgin's Church (More images)		Buckland; 51.2436°N 0.2510°W	Anglican	II	The ancient church was completely rebuilt in 1860 to the design of Henry Woodyer. It consists of an unaisled nave and chancel, windows with Decorated Gothic Revival tracery and a shingled bell turret holding six bells and topped with a small spire. A "pretty" spiral staircase leads to the bells. The main building material is Bargate stone rubble.	
St John the Baptist's Church (More images)		Capel; 51.1540°N 0.3206°W	Anglican	II	Another Henry Woodyer rebuild—of a 13th-century church this time, and completed in 1865—this simple building (nave, single aisle in a characteristic Woodyer style, featuring elaborate flat-headed windows, and a chancel) shares features with nearby Buckland. Examples include the spiral staircase leading to the bell turret, which has a shingled exterior and is supported on a wooden frame, and the Bargate stone walls.	
Friends Meeting House (More images)		Capel; 51.1513°N 0.3219°W	Quaker	II	Quakers have a long history in Capel: several prominent families were early converts, meetings commenced in the 1650s, and the present meeting house (with a later attached cottage) was built in 1724–25. It is of red, brown and blue brick with a tiled gabled roof, and is divided internally by a wooden screen.	
St Nicholas' Church (More images)		Charlwood; 51.1558°N 0.2276°W	Anglican	I	Three stages of work are visible at this large church: the original Norman building's nave was given a south aisle in the 13th century, then two centuries later the whole church was reconfigured and enlarged. The old chancel became a vestry, the south chapel took over as the chancel, and the central tower is now on the north side. This and the nave are the oldest parts, and they retain Norman windows and other details.	
Christ Church (More images)		Coldharbour; 51.1807°N 0.3577°W	Anglican	II	This isolated hilltop hamlet in Capel parish was given its own church in 1848 when Henry Labouchere of Broome Hall (later the seat of the Pigott-Brown baronets) paid for it. Built in sandstone to the design of Benjamin Ferrey, parished two years later and rebuilt by William Caröe in 1904, it has an aisleless nave and chancel, a stone bellcote on one gable end, and windows with tracery.	
St Paul's Church (More images)		Dorking; 51.2273°N 0.3314°W	Anglican	II	Henry Labouchere of Broome Hall paid for this church and Henry Thomas Hope gave the land—a site south of Dorking town centre. The Decorated Gothic Revival building by Benjamin Ferrey dates from 1857 and was added to many times: the north and south aisles date from 1860 and 1869 respectively, interior fittings were changed in 1866 and 1903, a vestry and organ chamber were built in 1897, and the gabled entrance porch dates from 1931. The roof has a small bell turret.	
St Martin's Church (More images)		Dorking; 51.2328°N 0.3323°W	Anglican/Methodist	II*	Henry Woodyer's "most important church", whose spire is a landmark across the town and for miles around, was built between 1868 and 1877 in a Decorated Gothic Revival style. The interior fittings are characteristically High Victorian Gothic. The church is now shared with the Methodist community, whose first chapel (opened by John Wesley in 1772) and its 1850 successor have been demolished.	
Crossways Community Baptist Church (More images)		Dorking; 51.2306°N 0.3350°W	Baptist	–	Sources disagree on whether this chapel on Junction Road was built in 1869 or 1876. The symmetrical façade is of three bays and has brick pilasters with rusticated ornamentation. The centre bay is arched and has a pediment above, and the roof is gabled. It was registered for marriages (with the name Baptist Chapel) in September 1912.	
Dorking Baptist Chapel (More images)		Dorking; 51.2336°N 0.3273°W	Baptist	–	A Strict Baptist congregation met between 1874 and 1900 under the direction of Holmwood's pastor Stephen Wilkins. Revived in 1905, the church again hired rooms and buildings, but in 1910 they took possession of a secondhand tin tabernacle. Brick walls were built around it, and it opened on 5 October 1910 with assistance from the minister at the chapel at Tadworth. It was registered for marriages in December 1916.	
First Church of Christ, Scientist, Dorking (More images)		Dorking; 51.2341°N 0.3267°W	Christian Scientist	–	This branch of the Mother Church in Boston, Massachusetts serves Dorking and the surrounding area. The church building on Moores Road, which was registered in January 1951, incorporates a Christian Science Reading Room.	
Dorking Muslim Community Association and Mosque		Dorking; 51.2340°N 0.3299°W	Muslim	–	The building on Hart Road was originally registered as a Plymouth Brethren meeting room in September 1984. After use as a synagogue, it was acquired by a Muslim congregation in 2006. The capacity is 100 worshippers.	
Meeting Room (More images)		Dorking; 51.2329°N 0.3332°W	Plymouth Brethren	–	Since the meeting room at Hart Road closed, this has been the only place of worship for Plymouth Brethren in the town. It occupies a building on Mint Gardens which was formerly in light industrial use. Planning permission for its conversion into a meeting room was granted in September 1993 and it was registered in March 1997.	
Friends Meeting House (More images)		Dorking; 51.2306°N 0.3336°W	Quaker	–	The Quaker cause thrived early here as at nearby Capel. Meetings officially started in about 1702 and a meeting house was built in 1709. The present building, on a different site, dates from 1846 and has a five-bay façade with a Tuscan-columned porch, brick walls and a slate roof.	
St Joseph's Church (More images)		Dorking; 51.2257°N 0.3365°W	Roman Catholic	–	Funded by Henry Fitzalan-Howard, 15th Duke of Norfolk, this church by Frederick Walters (built in 1894–95) superseded a temporary church opened 23 years earlier. Bargate and Bath Stone are the main building materials outside, and stone from the Beer Quarry Caves is used inside for the arcades. A tower and aisle were planned but were never built. The adjacent presbytery dates from 1871 and was the work of Gilbert Blount.	
Dorking United Reformed Church (More images)		Dorking; 51.2320°N 0.3347°W	United Reformed Church	II	Congregational (Note: The United Reformed Church denomination was formed from the amalgamation of the Congregational Church and the Presbyterian Church of England in 1972.) meetings began in Dorking in 1662, and the first church of that denomination was built in 1719. The present building, with its "handsome Italianate front" of brick and stone, replaced it in 1834 and was greatly altered 40 years later. William Hopperson and William Shearburn were the architects. The façae has three symmetrical bays with a doorway in each, large arched windows and a pediment.	
St Mary's Church (More images)		Fetcham; 51.2882°N 0.3526°W	Anglican	II*	Much 11th- and 12th-century work (including Saxon fragments and some Roman brickwork) remain in this large church which expanded slowly over time. The chancel is 13th-century, as is the north transept. Both aisles are 19th-century rebuilds of much older predecessors which had fallen into disrepair. The tower and the exterior flint and stonework have been restored.	
Cannon Court Evangelical Church (More images)		Fetcham; 51.2945°N 0.3492°W	Evangelical	–	A couple who moved from London to Fetcham started Evangelical meetings in a house in 1935. A church, Cannon Court Hall, was built in 1936, opened in September of that year and registered for marriages under that name in September 1946. An extension was added in 1940. As of 2002 there were one Wednesday and two Sunday services.	
Church of the Holy Spirit (More images)		Fetcham; 51.2894°N 0.3571°W	Roman Catholic	–	Fetcham's Roman Catholic church is part of a joint parish with the Church of Our Lady of Sorrows in nearby Effingham. It was registered for worship and for marriages in November 1968.	
Holy Trinity Church (More images)		Forest Green; 51.1594°N 0.3993°W	Anglican	–	Forest Green remains a distant outpost of Abinger parish, 3 miles (4.8 km) south of Abinger village. It was originally in Ockley parish. The brick and stone church, with a nave, chancel and rounded apse, dates from 1897 and is a memorial to the accidental death of local resident Ernest Hensley's son.	
Harvest Community Church (More images)		Goodwyns; 51.2191°N 0.3240°W	Elim Pentecostal	–	This was founded as an independent Evangelical church and was registered for worship in December 1965 and for marriages seven months later, both under the name Goodwyns Evangelical Free Church. It is now part of the Elim Pentecostal Church and the FIEC.	
St Nicolas' Church (More images)		Great Bookham; 51.2798°N 0.3740°W	Anglican	I	There are many similarities here with the church at neighbouring Fetcham, including the dates and the internal layout, but the prominent weatherboarded bell-turret at the west end resembles that at Burstow in east Surrey (although it is supported on a more complex internal wooden framework). The chancel is known to have been rebuilt in 1341 by monks from Chertsey Abbey. William Butterfield restored the church twice in the 19th century.	
Bookham Baptist Church (More images)		Great Bookham; 51.2788°N 0.3747°W	Baptist	–	This church occupies a site in Lower Road in the centre of Great Bookham village and has been in existence since 1928; it was registered for marriages in March of that year.	
Eastwick Road Church (More images)		Great Bookham; 51.2802°N 0.3674°W	United Reformed Church	–	The church was founded in 1895 as a Congregational mission chapel associated with the cause at Leatherhead. The building was said in 1908 to accommodate 200 worshippers. In September 1930 it was registered for marriages as a Congregational church.	
St Mary the Virgin's Church (More images)		Headley; 51.2801°N 0.2736°W	Anglican	II	The old church, whose ruin is preserved in the churchyard, was replaced by Anthony Salvin's Gothic Revival building in 1855 (described as "appalling" by Ian Nairn). Four years later George Edmund Street added a tower and spire. The walls are mostly of flint with some stone. The east window of the chancel is Decorated Gothic Revival in style.	
Kingdom Hall (More images)		Hookwood; 51.1803°N 0.1949°W	Jehovah's Witnesses	–	This Kingdom Hall stands on the A217 road between Gatwick Airport and Reigate. It serves the Redhill and Reigate Congregations of Jehovah's Witnesses. It was registered in May 1995.	
St Mary and St Nicholas' Church (More images)		Leatherhead; 51.2927°N 0.3269°W	Anglican	II*	Thoroughly restored on the outside, the interior of Leatherhead's ancient parish church retains its early-13th-century appearance. There are north and south aisles alongside the wide nave, a narrower chancel, transepts on each side and a diagonally offset west tower in the Perpendicular Gothic style.	
All Saints Church (More images)		Leatherhead; 51.3024°N 0.3294°W	Anglican	–	This "medium-sized ... building in the style of the 13th century" (i.e. Early English Gothic Revival) church built as a chapel of ease to serve the north of the town. The chancel, nave, side chapel and entrance porch are of flint and stone, but the interior is brick-built. It was designed by Arthur Blomfield at a cost of £1,610. The groundbreaking took place on 13 March 1888 and the church was consecrated on 23 February 1889. In 1981–82 it was converted into a combined church and community centre, reducing the capacity from 300 to 50.	
Light and Life Evangelical Church		Leatherhead; 51.2844°N 0.3342°W	Born Again Christians	–	This church caters specifically for members of the travelling community. It was registered for worship and for marriages in November 1994.	
Kingdom Hall (More images)		Leatherhead; 51.2944°N 0.3331°W	Jehovah's Witnesses	–	This serves the Leatherhead Congregation of Jehovah's Witnesses. Although the present building is modern, there has been a Kingdom Hall registered on the site in Emlyn Lane for many years: it was registered for worship in July 1949, and a marriage registration was recorded in The London Gazette in December 1961.	
Leatherhead Methodist Church (More images)		Leatherhead; 51.2943°N 0.3262°W	Methodist	–	Leatherhead's Methodist church opened as a Wesleyan chapel with attached halls in 1893 and was registered for marriages in February 1896. Its original name was the Wesley Memorial Methodist Church.	
Kingscroft Chapel (More images)		Leatherhead; 51.3027°N 0.3282°W	Open Brethren	–	This chapel on Kingscroft Road was registered for marriages under its present name in June 1943. It holds a service every Sunday.	
Church of Our Lady and St Peter (More images)		Leatherhead; 51.3001°N 0.3244°W	Roman Catholic	–	Joseph Goldie, the third generation of a family who were important contributors to Roman Catholic church architecture, designed Leatherhead's church in 1923. It is Perpendicular Gothic Revival in style, aisleless and flanked by side chapels. Eric Gill designed the Stations of the Cross; they were carved by Joseph Cribb. The church was registered for marriages in August 1924.	
Mount Zion Chapel (More images)		Leatherhead; 51.2937°N 0.3262°W	Strict Baptist	–	A couple who had been members of the Brockham and Tadworth Strict Baptist chapels started a meeting in Leatherhead in 1844, and in 1858 services transferred from their cottage to a hired room. A permanent chapel opened on 1 April 1869 and was registered for marriages in November 1901. The adjoining schoolroom dates from 1899.	
St Bartholomew's Church (More images)		Leigh; 51.2086°N 0.2484°W	Anglican	II*	Restorations in 1856 (by an architect called Larmer) and 1890 (by F.C. Lees) affected the simple Perpendicular Gothic appearance of this small 15th-century church. The walls and roof are of Reigate and Horsham Stone respectively. The large wooden bell turret and steeple date from 1890.	
All Saints Church (More images)		Little Bookham; 51.2743°N 0.3915°W	Anglican	II*	The church lacked a dedication until 1986, when the name All Saints was given. The simple building is largely early-12th-century but was altered in the 15th and 19th centuries. Flint and limestone are the main materials. Originally a single-cell church, it now has vestries, an organ chamber and a porch as well.	
St Michael's Church (More images)		Mickleham; 51.2675°N 0.3234°W	Anglican	II*	The bulky, tall west tower retains its 12th-century appearance, and the history of the church goes back to the 10th century, but there were two "drastic" 19th-century restorations (the first by P.F. Robinson) which, among other things, added two neo-Norman aisles and a round south tower. The Perpendicular Gothic Norbury Chapel commemorates occupants of the Norbury Park estate.	
St Peter's Church (More images)		Newdigate; 51.1652°N 0.2884°W	Anglican	II*	The chancel of this church is 13th-century, the south aisle, its arcade and some stained glass is a century later, and the bell-turret (similar to Burstow's) is 15th-century. Most of the other features date from a restoration of 1876–77, though. The peal of six bells were all cast in 1803.	
St John the Evangelist's Church (More images)		North Holmwood; 51.2119°N 0.3274°W	Anglican	II	This "hard, competent" flint-built Early English Gothic Revival church was designed in 1874–75 by Major Rohde Hawkins. A spire-topped tower stands at the northwest corner. James Powell and Sons (1875) and Charles Eamer Kempe (1892) provided stained glass.	
St John the Baptist's Church (More images)		Oakwood Hill; 51.1305°N 0.3895°W	Anglican	II*	Originally known as Okewood Chapel, this was a chapel of ease to Wotton until a parish was formed in 1853. It stands on elevated ground in the middle of a dense wood. Sandstone, firestone and chalk are the main materials, and the roof is of Horsham Stone. Basil Champneys greatly extended and restored the church in 1879. A wall painting of The Visitation has been dated to the 15th century.	
St Margaret's Church (More images)		Ockley; 51.1535°N 0.3474°W	Anglican	II*	Situated distant from the village in a tree-covered churchyard, this large church was extended in 1873 (the aisle and longer chancel date from then) but some 12th-century fabric remains. The nave is 14th-century, the entrance porch retains its 15th-century appearance despite restoration, and the bulky Perpendicular Gothic west tower was rebuilt between 1699 and 1700 (the latter date was scratched on one of the quoins by the mason William Butler.	
St Mary the Virgin's Church (More images)		Pixham; 51.2397°N 0.3165°W	Anglican	II*	Pixham's parish church is an "attractive village church" in an Arts and Crafts style by Edwin Lutyens. Apart from brickwork around the windows, the walls are entirely roughcast. The north face has a double gable; the west (entrance) elevation has one gable and a double entrance door with a huge semicircular tympanum from which layers of brick and tile radiate outwards. The sanctuary is topped with a dome.	
St Barnabas' Church (More images)		Ranmore Common; 51.2418°N 0.3600°W	Anglican	II*	One of George Gilbert Scott's best works, according to Ian Nairn, was this 1859 church built for George Cubitt, 1st Baron Ashcombe of Denbies. Although parished in 1860, it was always considered an "estate church", catering for the Barons Ashcombe and workers on the Denbies estate. The Barons held the advowson until 1962, at which point it came under the charge of St Martin's Church in Dorking. The building is cruciform with a tall tower and spire over the crossing. Rounded flint cobbles cover the walls. The sumptutous interior has much marble, and Clayton and Bell designed most of the stained glass.	
St Mary Magdalene's Church (More images)		South Holmwood; 51.1905°N 0.3243°W	Anglican	II	Now parished, this was originally a chapel of ease built on land donated by the Duke of Norfolk. The 1838 building was altered and enlarged four times in the next 25 years; architects involved included James Park Harrison, J.B. Watson and J. Wild. The style is Early English Gothic Revival, and local stone was the main building material. The final additions, in 1863, were the aisles and southwest tower.	
Holy Trinity Church (More images)		Westcott; 51.2236°N 0.3696°W	Anglican	II*	George Gilbert Scott's Decorated Gothic Revival church of 1852 stands on an elevated site at the southwest corner of the village. The tiled roof has a shingled broach spire at one end, and the walls are of knapped flint and ashlar. Two local residents each contributed £1,000 (£120,700 as of 2025). The east window has stained glass by James Powell and Sons.	
St Michael's Chapel of Ease (More images)		Westhumble; 51.2548°N 0.3293°W	Anglican	II	This chapel of ease to St Michael's Church at Mickleham was created out of a former farm outbuilding. The exterior is timber-framed with red brickwork in between; the tiled roof has gables at both ends. Referring to local resident George Meredith, author Arthur Mee wrote that "at Westhumble is the little weatherboarded chapel where his sister-in-law talked to the navvies on Sunday evenings".	
St John the Evangelist's Church (More images)		Wotton; 51.2799°N 0.2737°W	Anglican	I	The church dates back to the Saxon era, but the earliest surviving work is from very early in the Norman period. Most of the building is 13th-century, and the vestry and porch are Victorian additions. Wotton House was the seat of the Evelyn family, and many—including John Evelyn—are buried in the 17th-century Evelyn Mausoleum in the north chapel. The two-part pyramid roof to the tower is a curious feature not found elsewhere in Surrey.	

== Former places of worship ==
Former places of worship
Name	Image	Location	Denomination/ Affiliation	Grade	Notes	Refs
Abinger Hammer Mission Church Room		Abinger Hammer; 51.2155°N 0.4301°W	Anglican	–	This opened in 1887 as a chapel of ease to St James's Church at Abinger Common. Lady Farrer (wife of Thomas Farrer, 1st Baron Farrer of Abinger Hall) and L. Forster paid for the building, which served as a place of worship until closure in 1977. It is now a house.	
Free Church Mission Hall		Ashtead; 51.3135°N 0.3102°W	Baptist	–	Ashtead's first Baptist church was opened in 1895 and appears in that year's Ordnance Survey map as a mission hall. A new church superseded it in 1924, but the building survives and is used by the Epsom and Ewell Conservative Association.	
Church of Christ Our Hope (More images)		Beare Green; 51.1803°N 0.3195°W	Roman Catholic	–	The church was built in 1971 and registered for worship in March 1972 and for marriages 11 months later. It closed in 1989 as part of a diocesan policy to consolidate worship at fewer churches. Originally proposed for demolition for a housing development, the building instead became the village hall. During its brief period as a church it was said to serve Catholics in six villages.	
Gospel Hall (More images)		Betchworth; 51.2434°N 0.2686°W	Open Brethren	–	This building was originally a cattle shed. Sir Benjamin Collins Brodie (1783–1862) donated it for the use of a local Brethren congregation, although it was not formally registered for their use until 1944. By 2002 there was a weekly service on Sunday evenings. After several years of disuse, by 2016 the site and the building had been incorporated into the grounds of the neighbouring house.	
Brockham Green Chapel (More images)		Brockham; 51.2332°N 0.2859°W	Strict Baptist	–	Inspired by William Huntington, a man from Epsom founded a chapel there in 1780 and this chapel on Brockham Green three years later. The building was altered in 1907, and a marriage licence was granted in July 1927. The arched-windowed rendered building is now a house.	
Capel Methodist Chapel (More images)		Capel; 51.1510°N 0.3212°W	Methodist	–	A Wesleyan chapel existed in the village by 1911 and was registered for marriages in January 1921. Surrey History Centre holds records for the church up to 1985.	
Mission Hall (More images)		Charlwood; 51.1540°N 0.2252°W	Congregational	–	This building was originally used by a blacksmith, then as a slaughterhouse. It was first used for worship in 1885, then in 1889 it was bought and converted into a proper chapel. Like the Park Gate Mission Hall it was under the control of Dorking Congregational Church, and the two mission halls shared the same minister.	
Providence Chapel (More images)		Charlwood; 51.1567°N 0.2188°W	Independent Calvinistic	II*	A "startling" wooden building which has been likened to structures found in Canada, New England or Kentucky, this chapel served for nearly 200 years until it was put up for sale in 2012. Before 1816, when it was moved to Charlwood and re-erected on a lane, it served as an officers' mess in Horsham, West Sussex. When it opened in that year it was called Charlwood Union Chapel.	
Hampstead Road Church (More images)		Dorking; 51.2246°N 0.3358°W	Open Brethren	–	The building dates from 1863 and was erected for a Plymouth Brethren congregation. By the time it closed in 2010 because it was not large enough, worship was of a more Evangelical character and the church reformed under a new name; meetings were thereafter held in a school. The marriage registration, granted in July 1923 (when the chapel was called Hampstead Road Hall), was annulled in November 2011.	
Forest Green Congregational Church (More images)		Forest Green; 51.1589°N 0.3943°W	Congregational	–	Described by the Victoria County History of Surrey as being situated within Oakwood parish, this was opened in 1878 in the centre of Forest Green village at a cost of £606 (paid mostly by the Lord of the manor, who also gave the site) and was operated as an outpost of the church at Ewhurst. It was registered for marriages between May 1910 and March 1980.	
Gospel Hall		Gadbrook; 51.2177°N 0.2681°W	Open Brethren	–	Gadbrook is a hamlet in the parish of Leigh. An Independent Calvinist chapel became Strict Baptist for a time, then in June 1903 it was reregistered as a gospel hall. It closed in 2001, apparently after more than 165 years of religious use. The building was also known as Gadbrook Chapel.	
Ruins of Headley Old Church		Headley; 51.2799°N 0.2737°W	Anglican	II	All that remains of Headley's 15th-century church is this structure which stands over the grave of a former priest. It was fashioned from the surviving flintwork and ashlar of the old building. The entrance is an archway, and a domed roof has been added.	
Christ Church (More images)		Leatherhead; 51.2985°N 0.3200°W	United Reformed Church	–	The first Congregational church in Leatherhead, in a former barn, opened on 10 September 1816. A 250-capacity replacement chapel was finished 28 years later. The present building has adopted the name Christ Church and stands on the Epsom Road; it was registered for marriages in June 1936. The church closed on 4 January 2021.	
St John's Church (More images)		Ockley; 51.1469°N 0.3646°W	Anglican	–	Built on Ockley Green in the early 1870s, this chapel of ease to St Margaret's Church was consecrated by the Bishop of Winchester Samuel Wilberforce in December 1872. The "plain building" has brickwork and stonework, and the roof supports a bell turret. It was declared redundant in January 1983 and sold three years later for conversion into housing.	
Park Gate Mission Hall		Parkgate; 51.1835°N 0.2715°W	Congregational	–	A Congregational mission was founded at this hamlet in Newdigate parish in 1876. Services were held outside and in various cottages and rooms until this small mission hall was built. It opened on 2 June 1885, and was officially registered for worship between July 1898 and March 1980.	
Hope Chapel		South Holmwood; 51.1924°N 0.3245°W	Strict Baptist	–	The cause was founded by pastor Stephen Wilkins in 1869, and origins as far back as 1821 have been claimed, but the chapel (in a building which was always partly residential) was built five years later. It was registered for marriages in September 1909.	
St John's Free Church (More images)		Westcott; 51.2261°N 0.3645°W	Countess of Huntingdon's Connexion	–	John Worsfold founded this chapel for followers of Selina Hastings, Countess of Huntingdon's Nonconformist denomination, which was closely aligned with Calvinistic Methodism, in 1840. His endowment included glebe land and a house as well as an annual sum of £40 (£3,520 as of 2025)). The chapel was registered for marriages between January 1842 and October 2012, and is now owned by Holy Trinity parish church as a community hall.	
Ruins of West Humble Chapel (More images)		Westhumble; 51.2548°N 0.3393°W	Roman Catholic (Pre-Reformation)	II	Long since ruined and with only two flint walls (the east and west, pictured) standing, this was originally a plain rectangular church (48 by 16 feet (14.6 m × 4.9 m)) of approximately the late 13th century (although Ian Nairn considered it could be a century older than that). The west end retains a gable and circular opening. The chapel may have belonged to either Reigate or Merton Priory.	

== Bibliography ==
- Burleton, Eric (August 2000). Abinger: Some key dates in its history (PDF). Abinger & Coldharbour Parish News. Archived (PDF) from the original on 26 April 2017.
- Chambers, Ralph (1952). The Strict Baptist Chapels of England: Surrey and Hampshire. Vol. 1. Thornton Heath: Ralph Chambers.
- Cleal, Edward E.; Crippen, T. G. (1908). The story of Congregationalism in Surrey. London: James Clarke & Co.
- Facey, Roy A., ed. (1981). International Church Index (Doctrinal). Index Publications. ISBN 0-907578-00-4.
- Hill, Roy (2002) [1990]. The Assemblies Address Book (PDF) (5th ed.). Bristol: Christian Year Publications. ISBN 1-872734-25-1. Archived from the original on 19 September 2004.
- Methodist Church of Great Britain (1947). Methodist Church Buildings: Statistical Returns including Seating Accommodation as at July 1st, 1940 (PDF). Manchester: The Department for Chapel Affairs. Archived (PDF) from the original on 20 October 2019. (Available online in 14 parts Archived 2020-09-28 at the Wayback Machine; Guide to abbreviations on page 6 Archived 2019-10-20 at the Wayback Machine)
- Nairn, Ian; Pevsner, Nikolaus (1971) [1962]. The Buildings of England: Surrey (2nd ed.). Harmondsworth: Penguin Books. ISBN 0-300-09675-5.
- Stanway, Oscar (April 1940). The Story of Okewood Church. St John the Baptist Church, Okewood.
- Stell, Christopher (2002). Nonconformist Chapels and Meeting-houses in Eastern England. Swindon: English Heritage. ISBN 1-873592-50-7.
- Stockwell, Arthur H., ed. (1909). The Baptist Churches of Surrey. London: Arthur Stockwell.
