= Mole Valley =

Coordinates: 51°18′57.68″N 0°29′37.31″W

Mole Valley District
- Non-metropolitan district
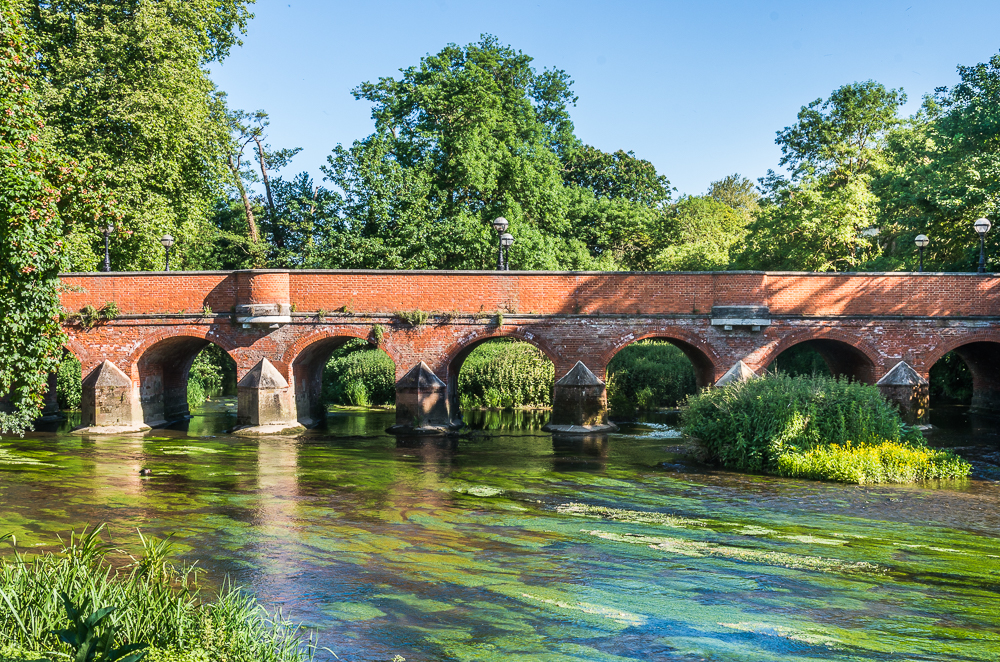
- Bridge over the River Mole at Leatherhead
- Motto(s): Ministrando vigilans (Latin: Vigilant in our serving)
- Mole Valley shown within Surrey
- Sovereign state: United Kingdom
- Constituent country: England
- Region: South East England
- Non-metropolitan county: Surrey
- Status: Non-metropolitan district
- Admin HQ: Dorking
- Incorporated: 1 April 1974

Government
  - Type: Non-metropolitan district council
  - Body: Mole Valley District Council

Area
  - Total: 99.7 sq mi (258.3 km^{2})
  - Rank: 133rd (of 296) Highest point : Leith Hill

Population (2024)
  - Total: 88,709
  - Rank: 272nd (of 296)
  - Density: 889.5/sq mi (343.4/km^{2})

Ethnicity (2021)
  - Ethnic groups: List: 92.7% White; 3% Asian; 2.5% Mixed; 0.9% other; 0.8% Black

Religion (2021)
  - Religion: List: 52.2% Christianity; 38.4% no religion; 6.3% not stated; 1.2% Islam; 0.7% Hinduism; 0.4% other; 0.4% Buddhism; 0.2% Judaism; 0.1% Sikhism
- Time zone: UTC0 (GMT)
  - Summer (DST): UTC+1 (BST)
- ONS code: 43UE (ONS); E07000210 (GSS)
- OS grid reference: TQ0496458567

Mole Valley is a local government district in Surrey, England. Its council is based in Dorking, and the district's other town is Leatherhead. The largest villages are Ashtead, Fetcham and Great Bookham, in the northern third of the district.

Most of the district is on the escarpments of or adjoins the Surrey Hills, a designated Area of Outstanding Natural Beauty, which cover parts of the North Downs and Greensand Ridge, including locally Leith Hill, Polesden Lacey and Box Hill. Denbies Wine Estate, the largest vineyard in the country, is on the hills north-west of Dorking. The Pilgrims' Way footpath runs along the North Downs. There are stations on the London–Worthing and Reading–Gatwick Airport railways, and in the northern third, a commuter stopping-service pattern line, London–Guildford (via Epsom) line.

The A24 road and the M25 motorway are the main thoroughfares and relative to London the incidence of car ownership is high. Between 2011 and its final iteration in 2019, the area hosted hill-focused sub-laps of the London–Surrey Classic cycling tour, an event established as preparation for the visit to Mole Valley of the 2012 Olympic Games Road Races.

The neighbouring districts are Epsom and Ewell, Reigate and Banstead, Crawley, Horsham, Waverley, Guildford, Elmbridge and the London borough Kingston upon Thames.

== History ==
The district was created on 1 April 1974 under the Local Government Act 1972, covering three former districts which were all abolished at the same time:

- Dorking and Horley Rural District (except Horley and Salfords and Sidlow which went to Reigate and Banstead and parts of the parishes of Charlwood and Horley around Gatwick Airport which went to Crawley)
- Dorking Urban District
- Leatherhead Urban District

The new district was named after the River Mole, which flows through the area.

As part of upcoming structural changes to local government in England, the district will be abolished in April 2027 and the area will become part of the new unitary authority of East Surrey.

== Governance ==
- See main article: Mole Valley District Council

== Towns and parishes ==
The former Leatherhead Urban District, which included Ashtead, Fetcham, Great Bookham and Little Bookham, is an unparished area, as is the majority of the former Dorking Urban District.

The rest of the district is covered by civil parishes:

- Abinger
- Betchworth
- Brockham
- Buckland
- Capel
- Charlwood
- Headley
- Holmwood
- Leigh
- Mickleham
- Newdigate
- Ockley
- Wotton

== Demographics ==
A Legatum Prosperity Index published by the Legatum Institute in October 2016 showed Mole Valley as the second most prosperous council area in the United Kingdom, after the nearby Borough of Waverley.

== Churches graded II* or above ==
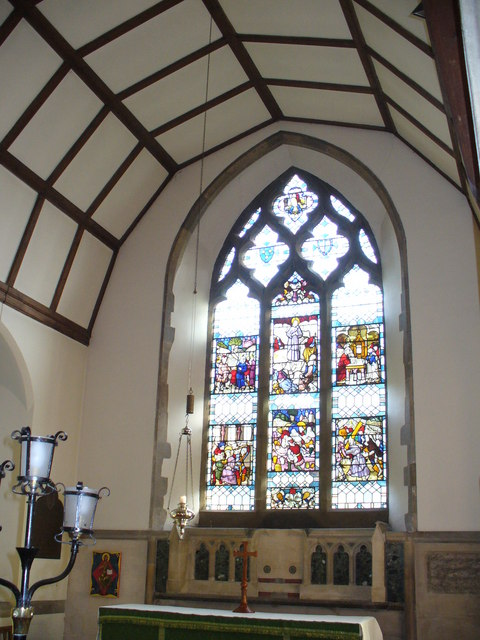
St Nicolas, Great Bookham

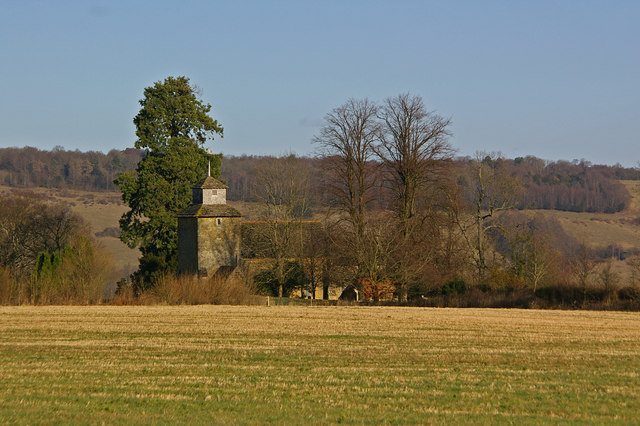
St John, Wotton

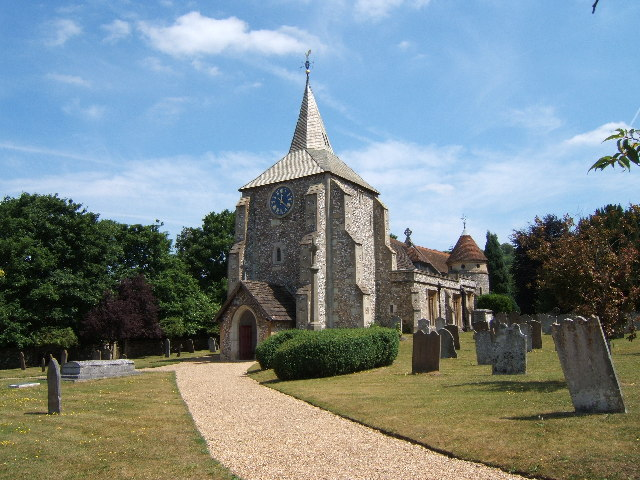
St Michael, Mickleham

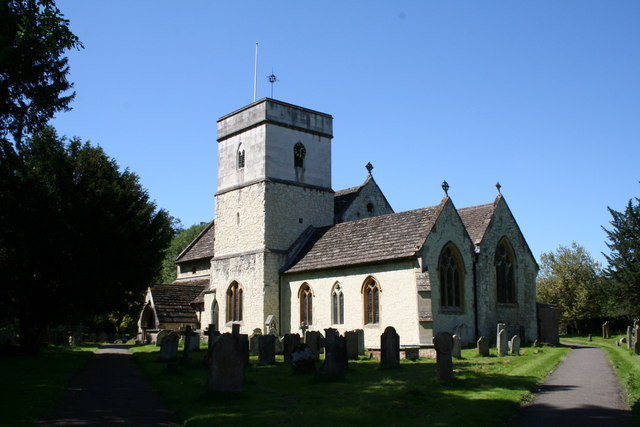
St Michael's Betchworth, 13th century, used in Four Weddings and a Funeral

Church	Place	Listed building Class
St Michael	Betchworth	I
St Nicolas	Great Bookham	I
All Saints	Little Bookham	II*
St Nicholas	Charlwood	I
St Michael	Mickleham	I
St John the Evangelist	Wotton	I
St Mary & St Nicholas	Leatherhead	II*
St Barnabas	Ranmore Common	II*
St Mary	Pixham	II*
St Martin	Dorking	II*
St Mary	Fetcham	II*
St Giles	Ashtead	II*
St James	Abinger Common	II*
Holy Trinity	Westcott	II*
St Bartholomew	Leigh	II*
St Margaret	Ockley	II*
St John the Baptist	Walliswood	II*

== Emergency services ==
Mole Valley is served by these emergency services:

- Surrey Police. Dorking Police Station is the lead station in Mole Valley Division, Leatherhead Police Station is now closed.
- South East Coast Ambulance Service The district has two Ambulance Stations – one in North Holmwood (1 mile (2 km) south of Dorking), and the other in Leatherhead.
- Surrey Fire & Rescue Service, The district has two Fire Stations one in North Holmwood and the other in Leatherhead.
- SURSAR, The district is covered by Surrey Search & Rescue
- Hospital, Each town has a small NHS Hospital with no A&E. They are used for outpatients and rehabilitation.

== Freedom of the District ==
- DMRC Headley Court received the Freedom of the District on 25 May 2010.

== See also ==
- List of places of worship in Mole Valley
