= St Martin's Church, Dorking =

St Martin's Church
- Church of St Martin of Tours, Dorking
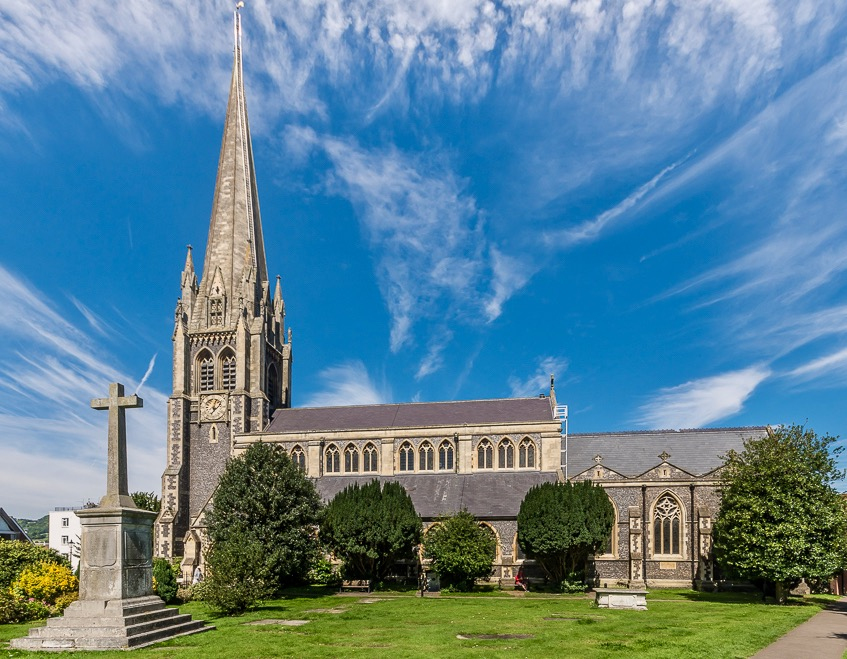
- view from the south

- Location within Surrey
- 51°13′58″N 0°19′56″W
- OS grid reference: TQ 16540 49499
- Location: Dorking, Surrey
- Country: England
- Denomination: Anglican
- Website: StMartinDorking.org

History
- Status: Active
- Dedication: St Martin of Tours

Architecture
- Functional status: Parish church
- Architect: Henry Woodyer
- Style: Gothic

Administration
- Province: Canterbury
- Diocese: Guildford
- Archdeaconry: Dorking
- Deanery: Dorking

Clergy
- Bishop: Rt. Rev. Christopher Hill
- Rector: Rev Derek Tyghe

Listed Building – Grade II*
- Official name: Church of St Martin
- Designated: 11 June 1973
- Reference no.: 1028904

St Martin's Church is an Anglican parish church in Dorking, Surrey. It is a Grade II* listed building and surviving parts of the structure date back to the Middle Ages. It in the archdeaconry of Dorking, in the Diocese of Guildford. The church is the main Anglican parish church in Dorking and was refurbished to the designs of Henry Woodyer.

== History ==
=== Early history ===
In the Domesday Book of 1086 there is a mention of a church in the Manor of Dorking. The present church was originally built in the twelfth century probably to replace the previous one. In the 14th century the church was extended and conveyed to the Priory of the Holy Cross in Reigate. It also served as a school house for parts of the 17th century.

=== 19th century ===
In the 19th century, sizeable renovations were done to the church. Between 1835 and 1837 the nave was rebuilt. From 1866 to 1868, this was followed by the chancel being rebuilt. In 1872, the nave and aisles were restored again, this time under the direction of the architect Henry Woodyer.

From 1873 to 1877, a new tower and a spire (210 feet high) were added. The bells, which were acquired in 1626 were then rehung in the new bell tower. In 1912, work on extending the lady chapel was completed.

== Parish ==
=== Church ===
The church is also shared with the local Methodist congregation. In 1973, the Methodist church in Dorking closed and an agreement was drawn up whereby they could share the church building. In 1976, another agreement was reached so that the nearby Christian Centre could be used by both congregations as a church hall.

=== School ===
The church has a close relationship with the nearby St Martin's Church of England Primary School.

== Gallery ==
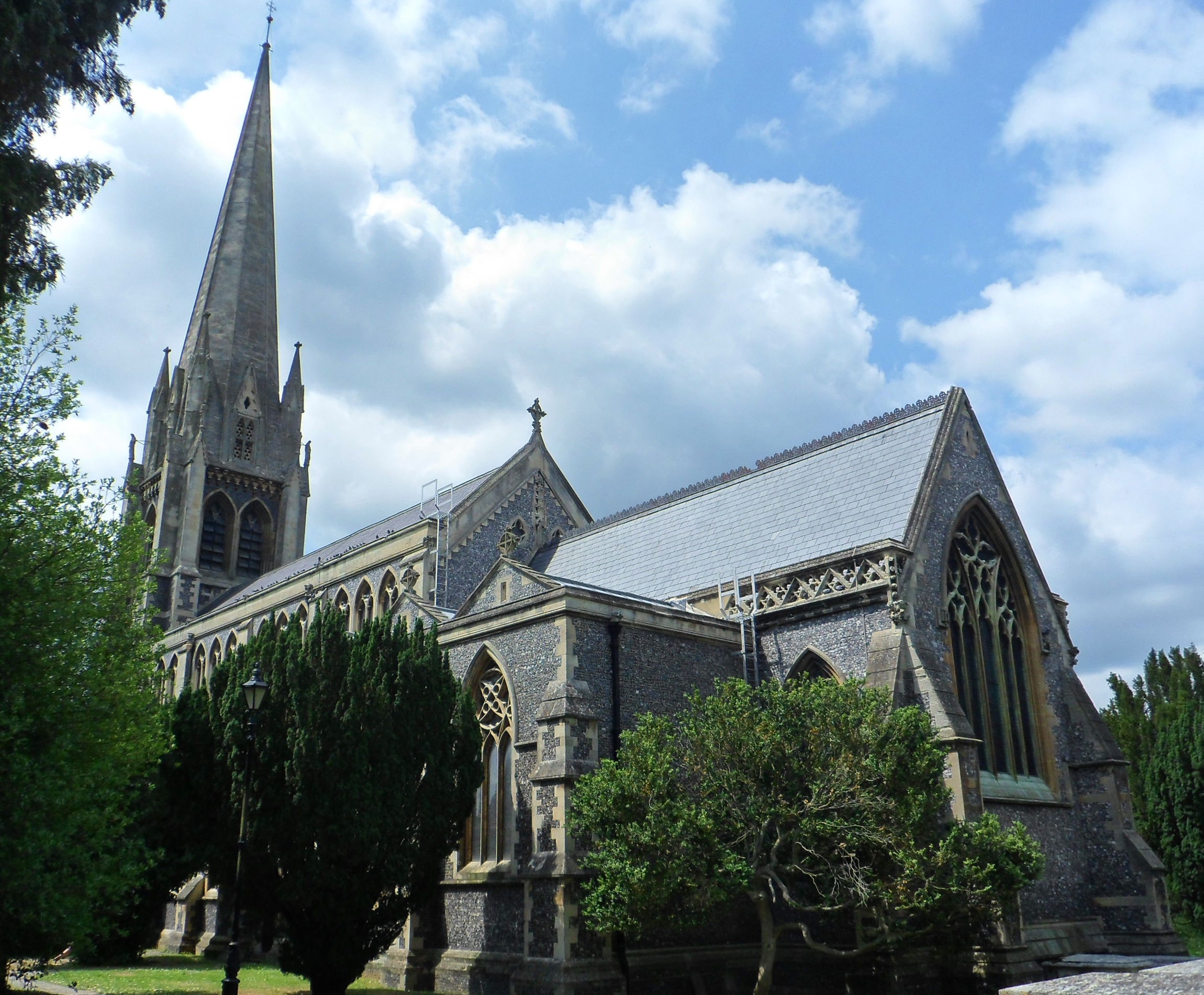
View from the south east

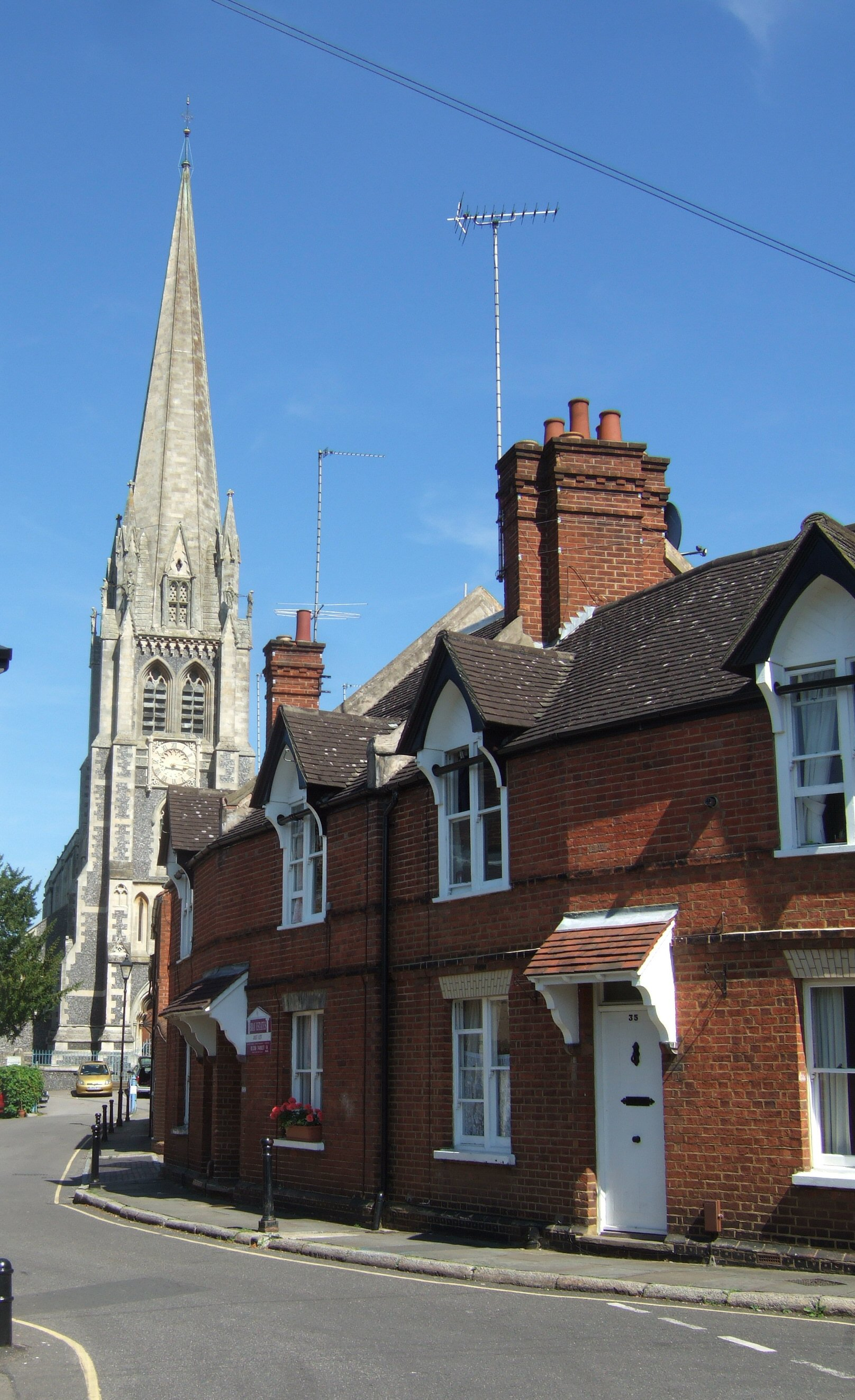
Church spire from the west

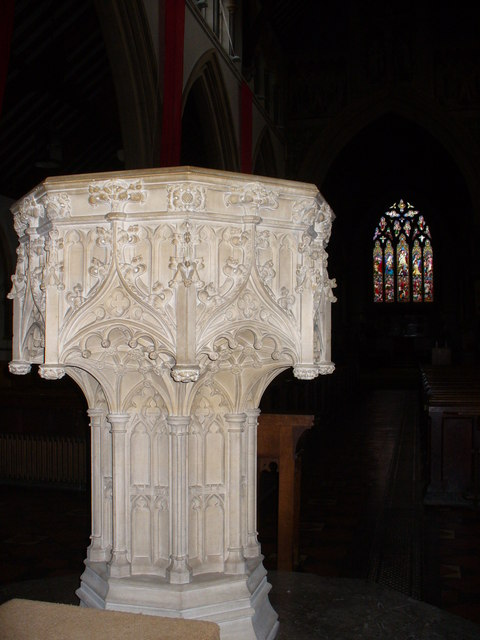
Baptismal font

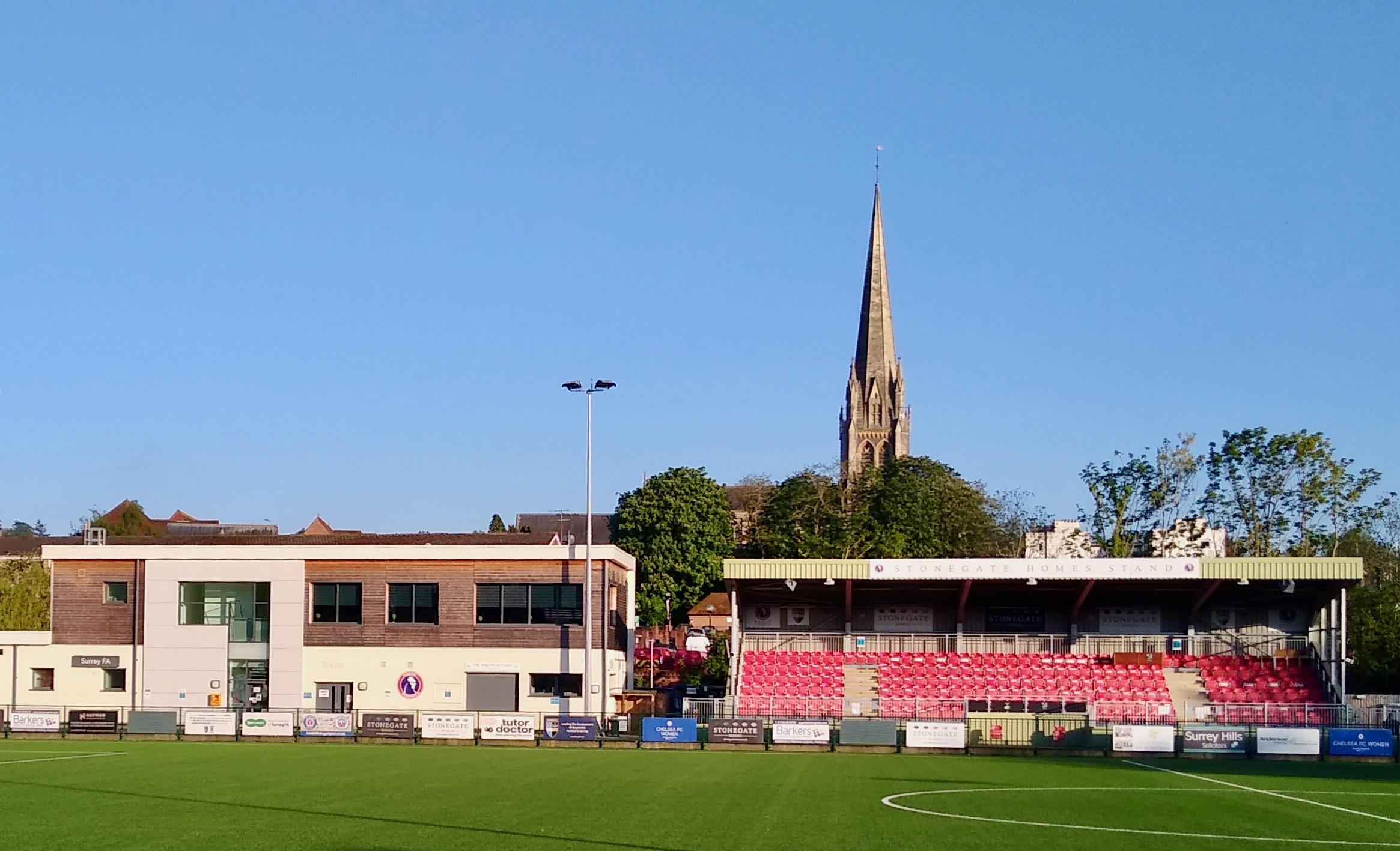
Church spire behind Meadowbank Stadium

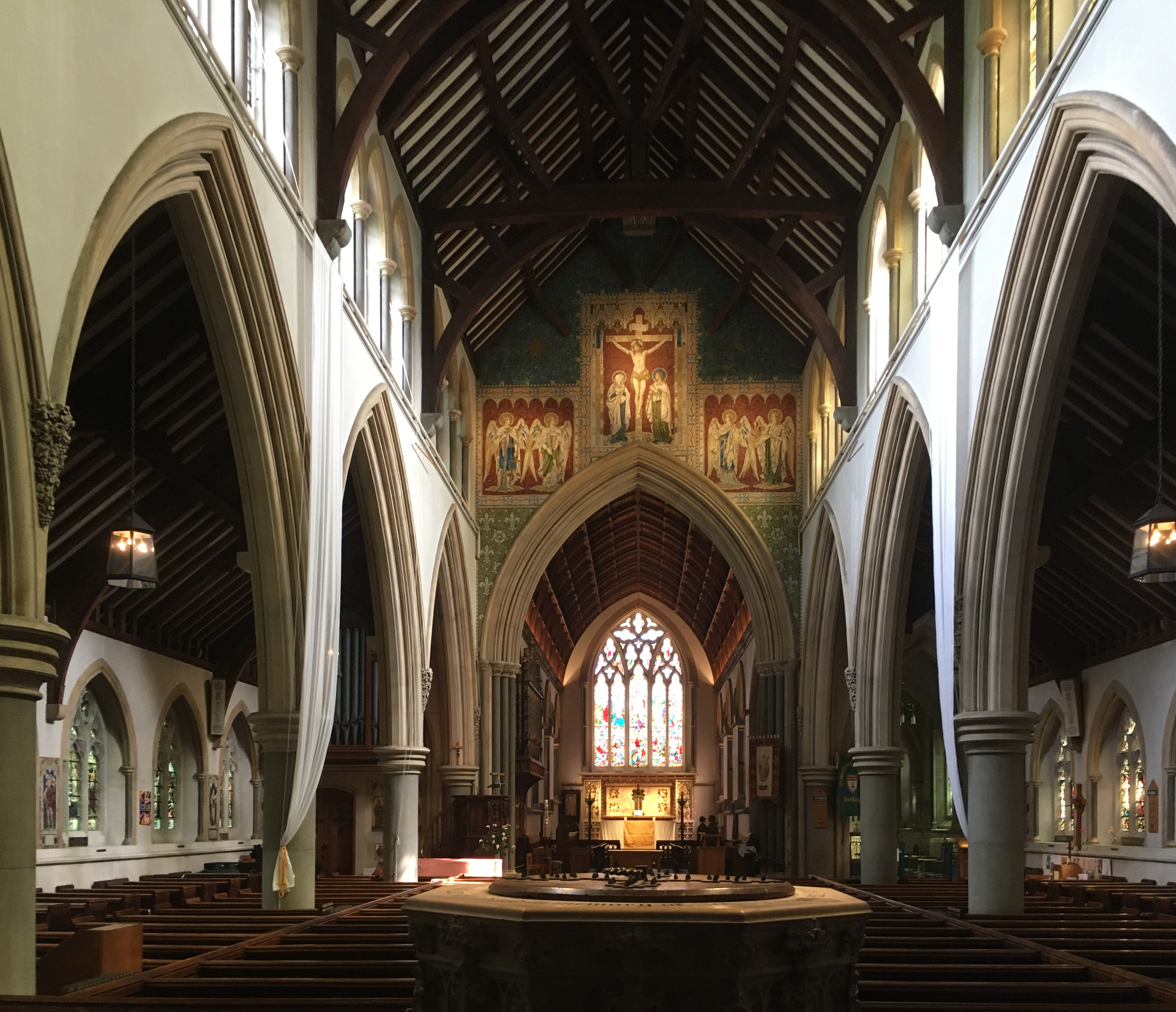
Interior of nave

== See also ==
- Dorking
- List of places of worship in Mole Valley
- St Joseph's Church, Dorking
