= Ockley =

Village in Surrey, England

Coordinates: 51.148°N 0.363°W

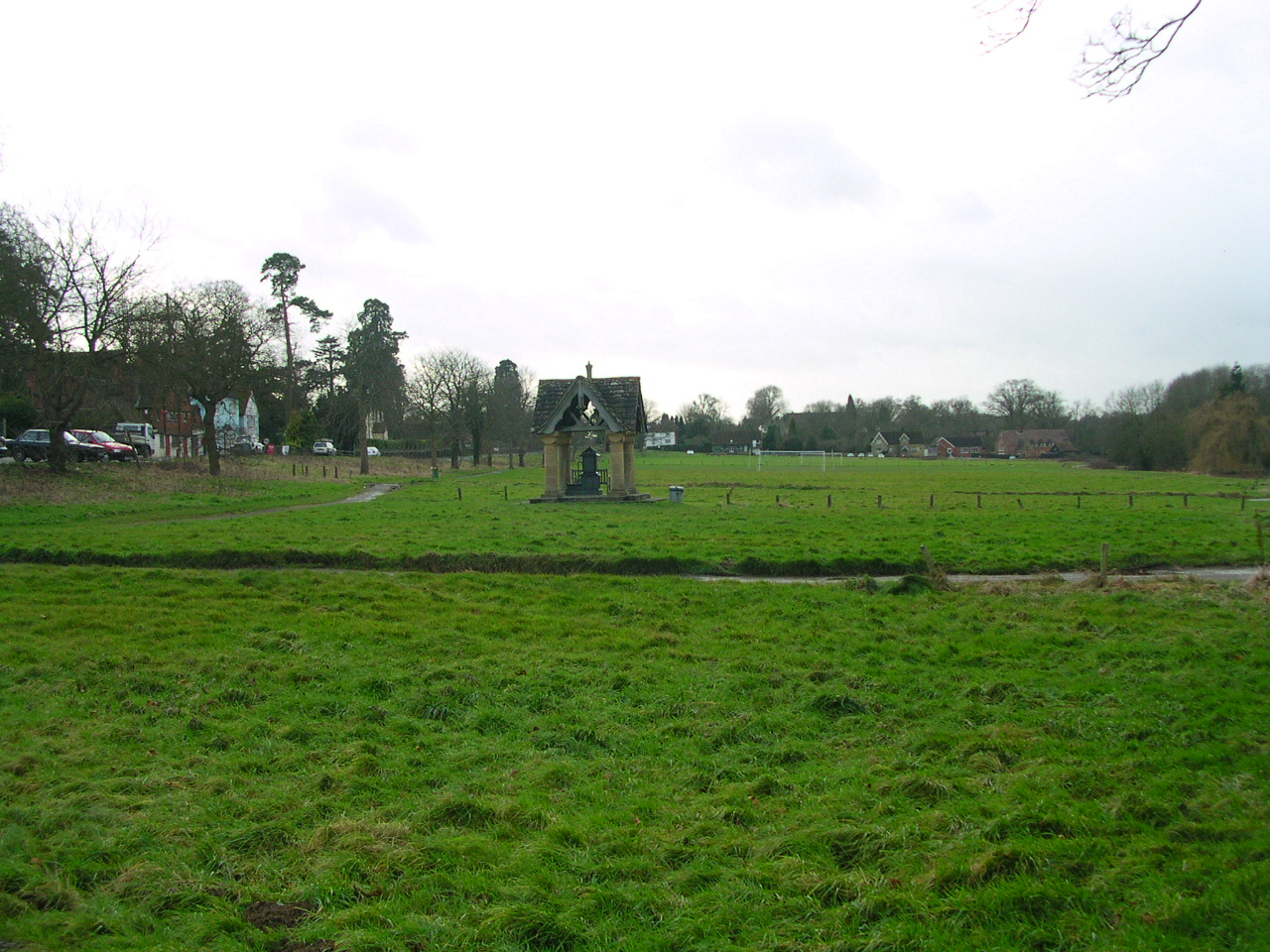
- Ockley Green

- Location within Surrey
- Area: 13.75 km^{2} (5.31 sq mi)
- Population: 871 (Civil Parish 2011)
  - Density: 63/km^{2} (160/sq mi)
- OS grid reference: TQ1540
- Civil parish: Ockley
- District: Mole Valley
- Shire county: Surrey
- Region: South East
- Country: England
- Sovereign state: United Kingdom
- Post town: Dorking
- Postcode district: RH5
- Dialling code: 01306
- Police: Surrey
- Fire: Surrey
- Ambulance: South East Coast
- UK Parliament: Dorking and Horley

Ockley is a rural village in Surrey. It lies astride the A29, the modern road using the alignment of Stane Street (Chichester). The A29 diverges from the A24 from London about 2.5 miles northeast and takes the alignment of Stane Street a mile north of the village. It has a medieval parish church, see list of places of worship in Mole Valley.

== History ==
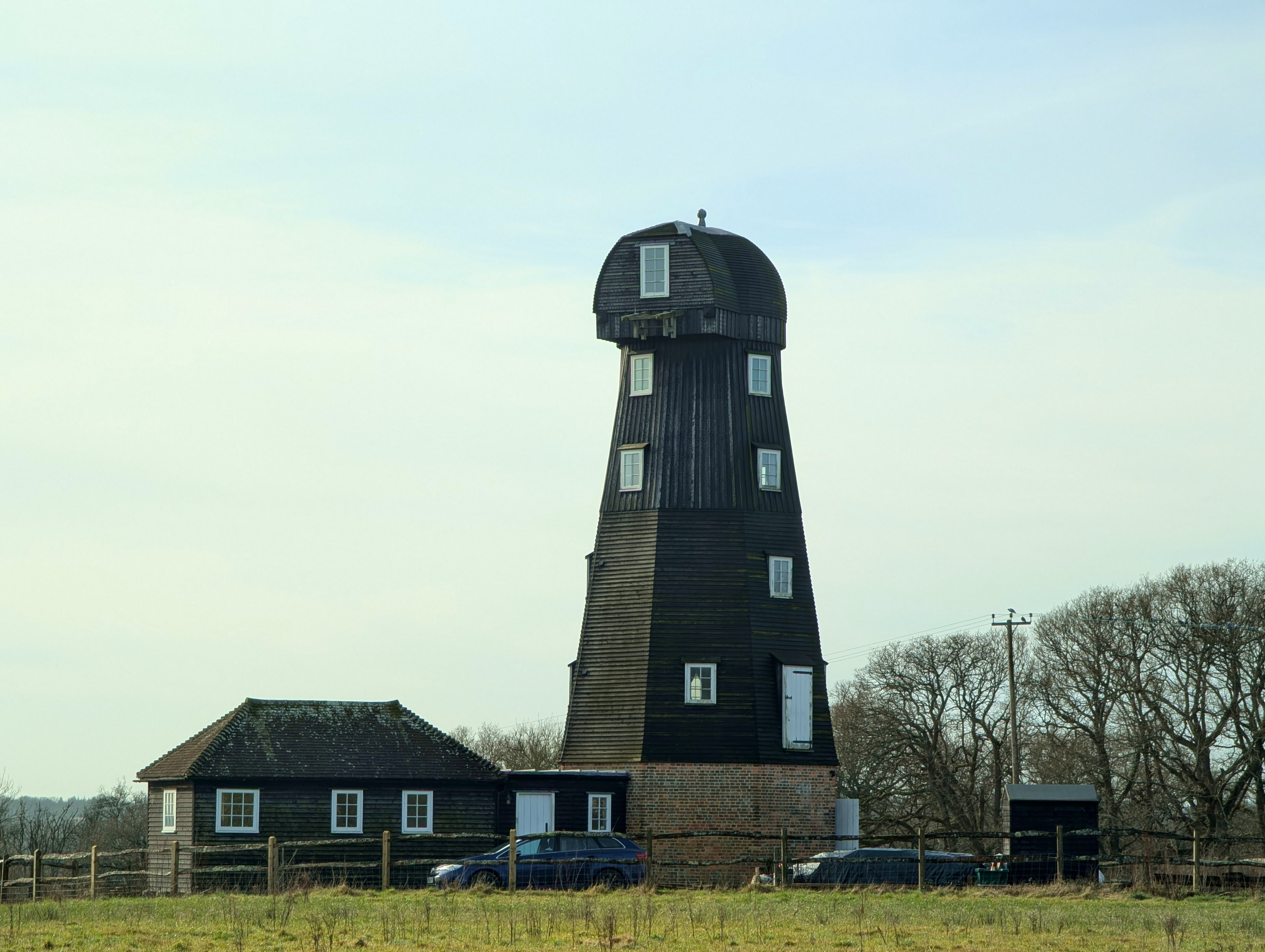
The reconstructed (without sails) smock windmill February 2025

Finds of small artifacts dating to Roman Britain associated with the Roman road stretching from Chichester to London have been made since at least the 19th century.

Ockley's name initially appears to fit the uncertain site where battle took place described in the entry for the year 851 of the Anglo-Saxon Chronicle. According to the chronicler, king Æthelwulf and his son Æthelbald, together with the West-Saxon army, fought against an invading Danish army of 350 ships that had plundered London and Canterbury previously, and had also put king Beorhtwulf of Mercia to flight. The chronicler refers to the battlefield as Aclea, Oak Lea, and the Danish army was defeated suffering "the greatest slaughter… we have heard tell of up to this present day". However, Aclea almost always appears in modern English as Oakley not Ockley and the identification of Ockley with the battlefield is made virtually impossible.

Ockley appears in Domesday Book of 1086 as Hoclei. It was held by Radulf (Ralph) from Richard Fitz Gilbert. Its domesday assets were: 1 hide. It had 5 ploughs, woodland worth 20 hogs. It rendered £3 10s 0d to its overlords per year.

Nicholas Culpeper, a leading Stuart period herbalist, was probably born here on 18 October 1616.

In 1911 the parish was "agricultural, except for a little brick and tile making".

The village had a smock windmill known as Elmer's Mill (or Almer's Mill), between 1803 and its collapse in 1944 and eventual reconstruction as a dwelling circa 2012.

== Sports ==
Informal football is generally played on Ockley Green which has football posts in place.

Ockley Cricket Club celebrated its 170th anniversary in 2022. League matches are played on Saturdays with friendly games on Sundays.

Ockley has Gatton Manor Golf Course on the outskirts of the village, within the parish bounds.

The village has featured in longer routes of the London-Surrey Cycle Classic.

== Geography ==
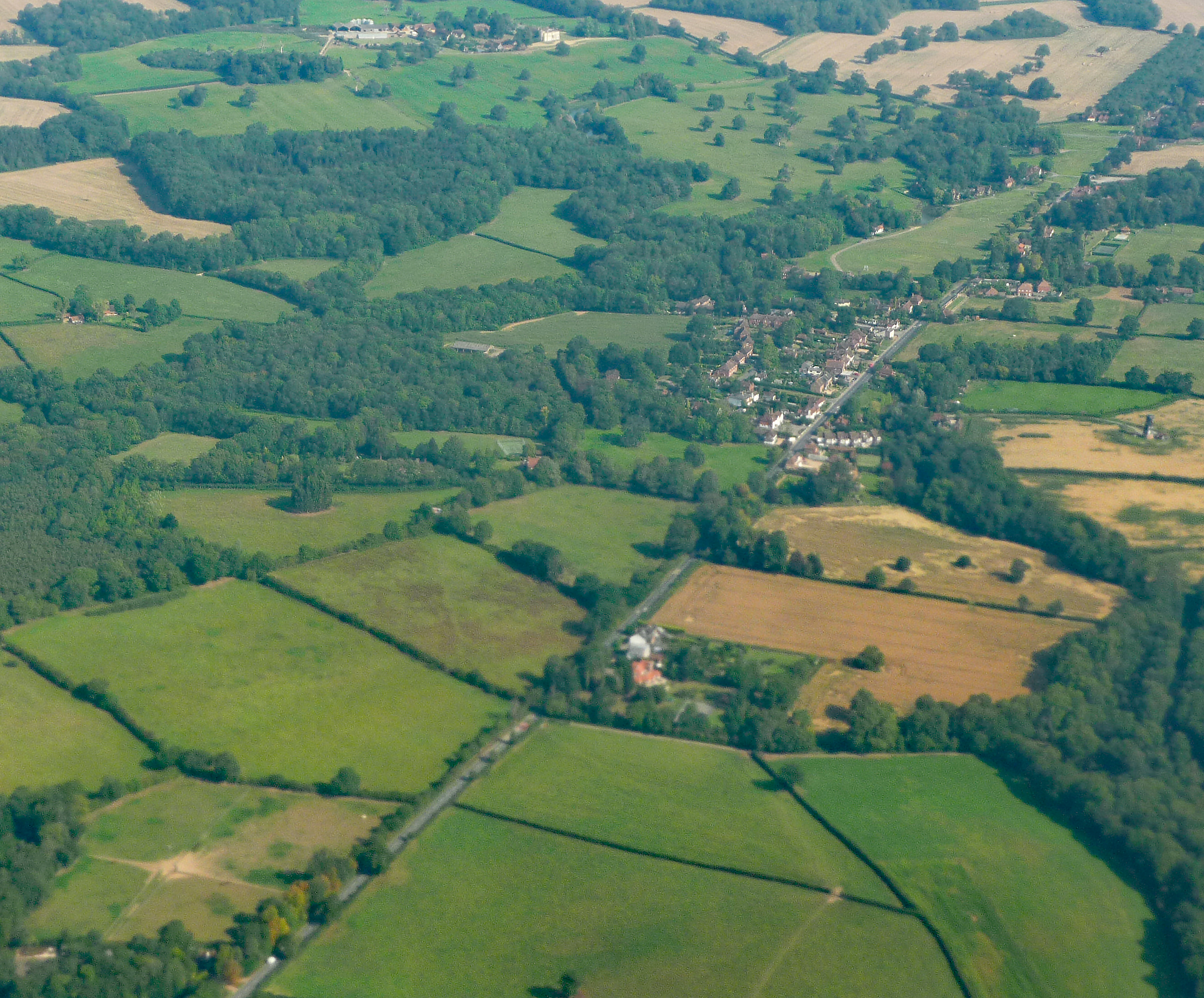
Aerial view

Between Dorking and Horsham, close to the Sussex/Surrey border, Ockley stretches to the escarpment of Leith Hill, the second highest point in South East England, after Walbury Hill in the far south-west of Berkshire. The northern border is marked by the Greensand Ridge. Close to the Greensand Ridge are small beds of Sussex marble, and remnants of a former limestone area of the Weald.

== Transport ==
=== Roads ===
The A29 is the main road through the village with Horsham to the south and Dorking to the north. Local minor roads provide relatively straight access from just north of the village's developed area to Ewhurst and Cranleigh to the west and Capel to the east.

=== Rail ===
The village is served by Ockley railway station which is 2 miles (3.2 km) to the east, due to a Victorian aristocrat having imposed his manor's name on a station closer to Capel, Surrey.

== Demography and housing ==
2011 Census Homes
Output area	Detached	Semi-detached	Terraced	Flats and apartments	Caravans/temporary/mobile homes	shared between households
(Civil Parish)	147	132	44	18	11	0

The average level of accommodation in the region composed of detached houses was 28%, the average that was apartments was 22.6%.

2011 Census Key Statistics
Output area	Population	Households	% Owned outright	% Owned with a loan	hectares
(Civil Parish)	871	352	34.7%	26.7%	1375

The proportion of households in the civil parish who owned their home outright compares to the regional average of 35.1%. The proportion who owned their home with a loan compares to the regional average of 32.5%. The remaining % is made up of rented dwellings (plus a negligible % of households living rent-free).

== See also ==
- List of places of worship in Mole Valley
