= Goodwyns =

Housing estate in Dorking, Surrey, England

Coordinates: 51.2180°N 0.3252°W

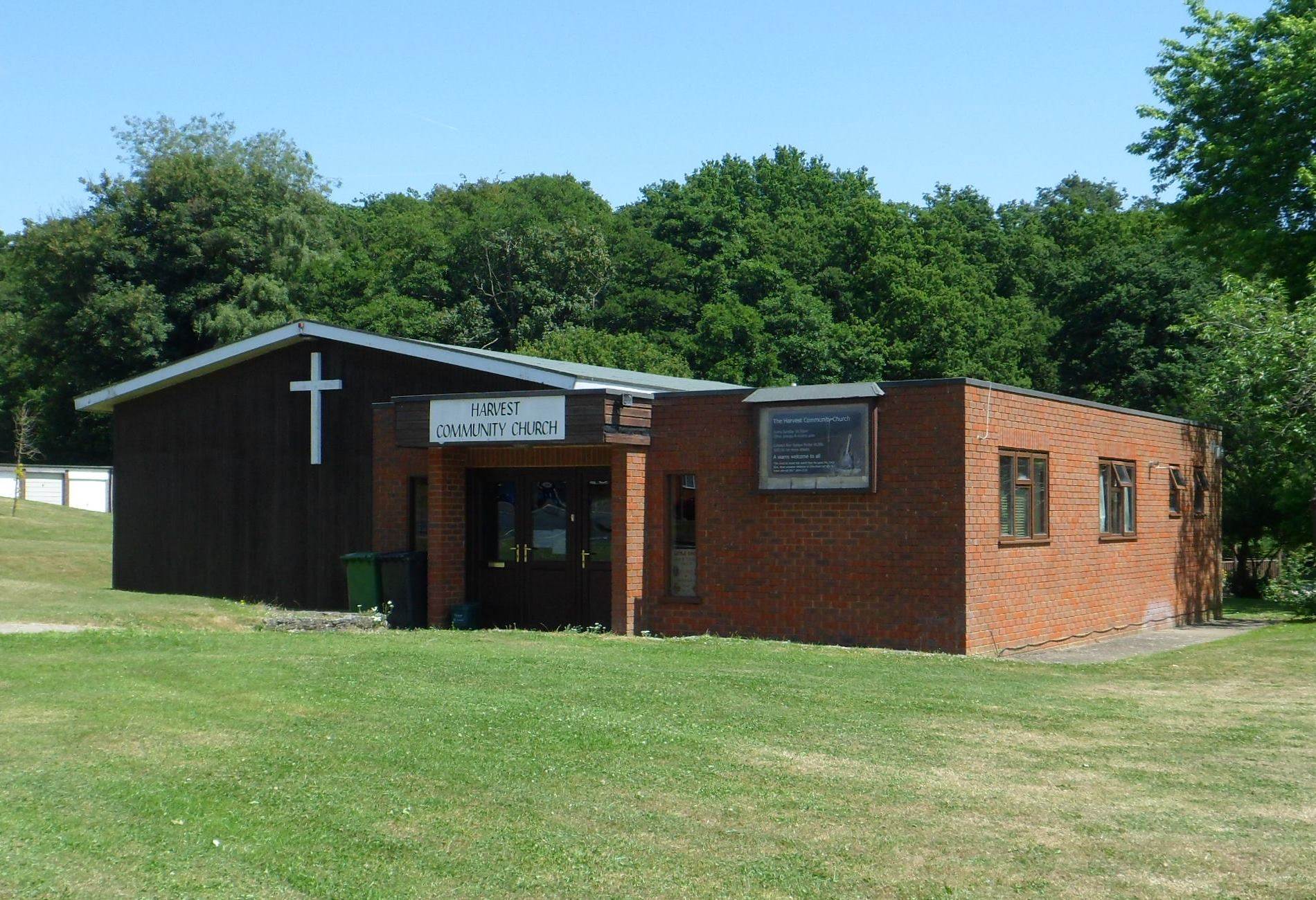
- The Harvest Community Church on Stubs Hill

- Location within Surrey
- OS grid reference: TQ170478
- District: Mole Valley
- Shire county: Surrey
- Region: South East
- Country: England
- Sovereign state: United Kingdom
- Post town: Dorking
- Postcode district: RH4
- Dialling code: 01306
- Police: Surrey
- Fire: Surrey
- Ambulance: South East Coast
- UK Parliament: Dorking and Horley

Goodwyns is a housing estate in Dorking, a market town in Surrey, England. It is on the return slope of one of two hillsides of the town and adjoins North Holmwood, a green-buffered village. The town centre is about 1.7 miles (2.7 km) away.

== History and architecture ==
The area was developed in the mid-1950s as a council estate on behalf of the former Dorking Urban District Council by the architects William Ryder & Associates. The name recalls Goodwyns Place, a Grade II-listed country house to the north. This Arts and Crafts-style building was designed in 1901 by Hugh Thackeray Turner.

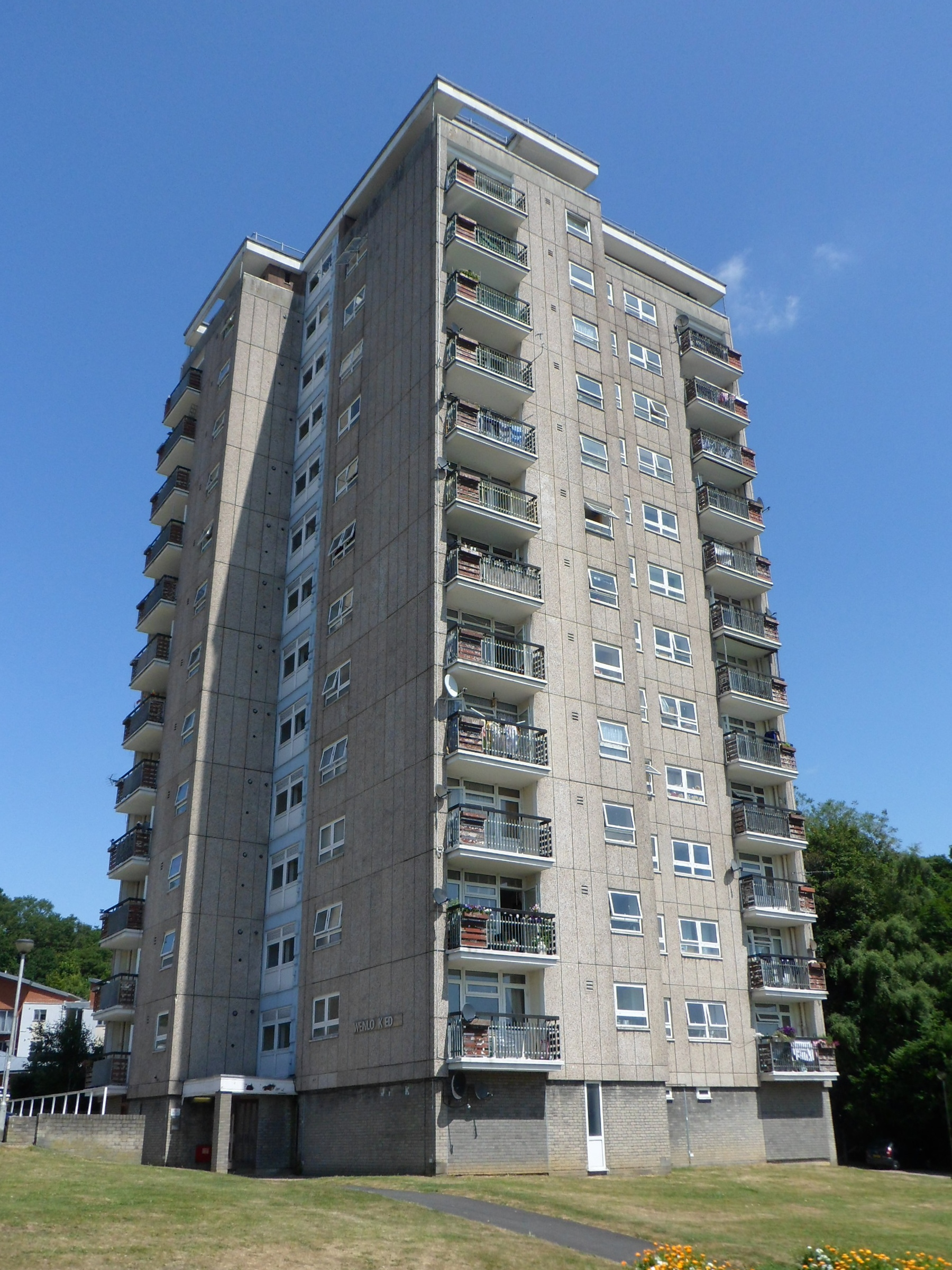
The Wenlock Edge flats date from 1965.

The design of the buildings and the estate's layout were praised by architectural historians Ian Nairn and Nikolaus Pevsner, who described it as "unusually good" for a council estate. The housing was developed in three parts: first, on the lowest lying land and arranged around culs-de-sac, groups of red-brick houses with rendered panelling; then blocks of red- and pale-brick flats of three and four storeys on the rising land, some with steel balconies and with a mixture of flat and sloping roofs; then two 14-storey concrete-faced tower blocks. Completed in 1965, Wenlock Edge and Linden Lea were described as "more elegant than average" because of the layout of successive projecting and recessed sections on each face. The estate retains large areas of open space and has a semi-rural character, but there is little tree cover. The layout is approximately circular: the residential areas are bounded by two perimeter roads with other roads linking them. These streets are wide and lined with grass verges, encouraging on-street parking.

In local government it is long in the Ward: Holmwoods, currently one of 21 wards in Mole Valley district. The ward's population was 6,417 at the time of the United Kingdom Census 2011. For the ward as a whole, housing tenure statistics reveal a lower proportion of owner-occupancy than in the district overall: according to the 2011 Census, 60.2% of properties were owner-occupied against 73.6% in Mole Valley as a whole. On the Goodwyns estate itself, some properties are now owner-occupied and others are rented—mostly from the Mole Valley Housing Association. Formed in October 2007, this housing association is part of the Circle Housing Group and is responsible for the 3,850 synonymous with the district. The association is seeking to redevelop parts of the estate, and has submitted planning applications to build 19 more flats and three houses on various underutilised sites on the estate; partly to be available under shared ownership.

== Amenities ==
The estate is served by the Harvest Community Church, affiliated with the Elim Pentecostal movement and the FIEC. It was originally an independent Evangelical church and was registered for marriages under the name Goodwyns Evangelical Free Church in July 1966. Goodwyns is in the Anglican parish of North Holmwood, served by St John the Evangelist's Church. St John's Church of England Community School and the Dorking Rural Sure Start Children's Centre are also located at Goodwyns.

== Public transport ==
Metrobus route 93 runs every hour on Mondays to Saturdays and every 2 hours on Sundays between the estate and Dorking railway station via the town centre. In the other direction, the service continues to Horsham via Capel.

== Bibliography ==
- Nairn, Ian; Pevsner, Nikolaus (1971) [1962]. The Buildings of England: Surrey (2nd ed.). Harmondsworth: Penguin Books. ISBN 0-300-09675-5.
