= Leigh, Surrey =

Village and parish in Surrey, England

Coordinates: 51.210°N 0.258°W

Leigh
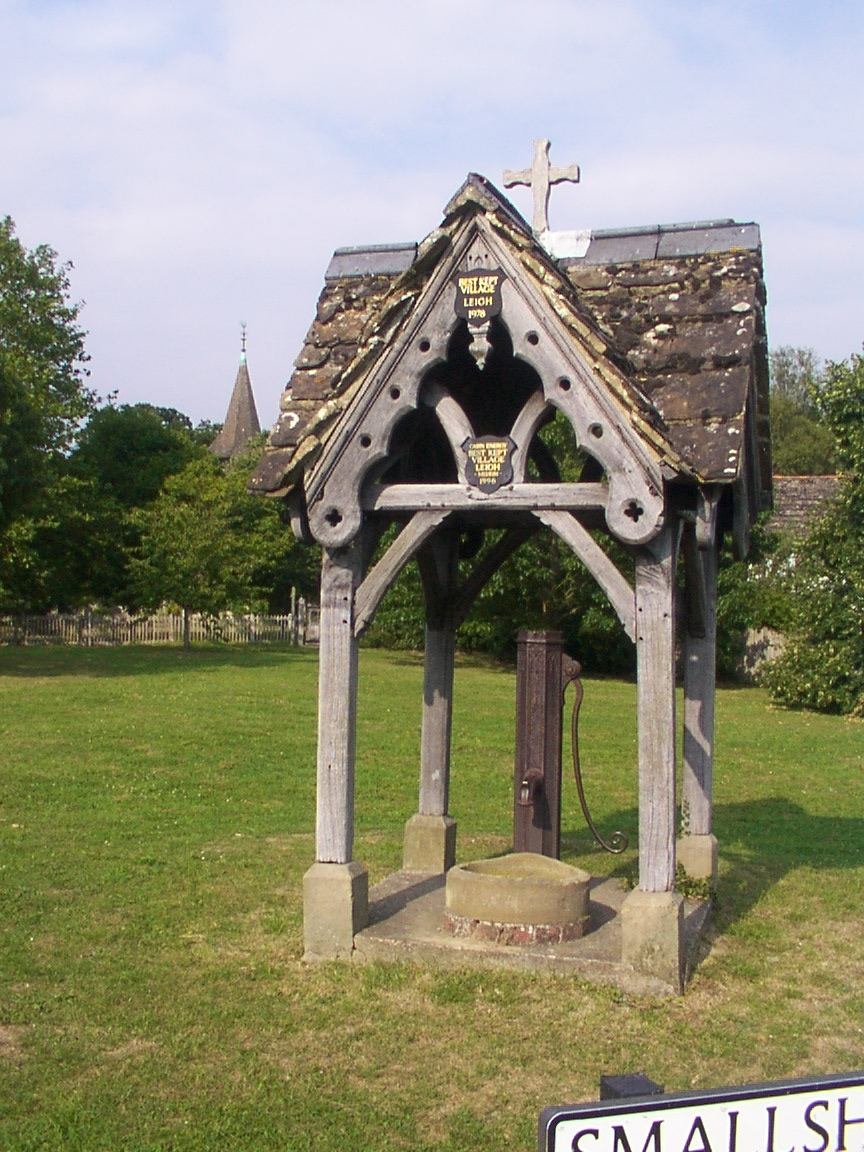
- Defunct village water pump above a well

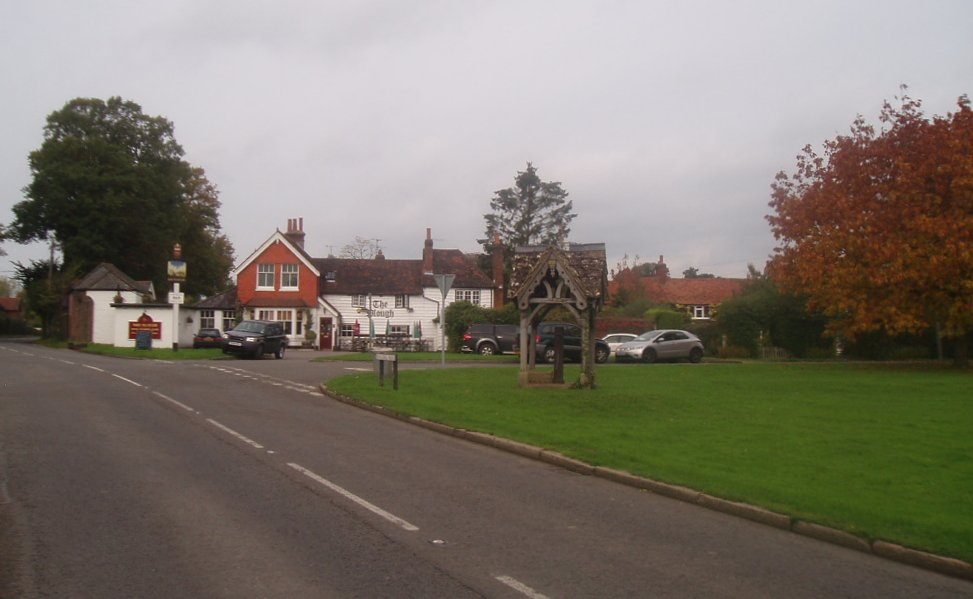
- Village green with one of the two pubs in Leigh in the background.

- Location within Surrey
- Area: 13.82 km^{2} (5.34 sq mi)
- Population: 943 (Civil Parish 2011)
  - Density: 68/km^{2} (180/sq mi)
- OS grid reference: TQ217471
- District: Mole Valley
- Shire county: Surrey
- Region: South East
- Country: England
- Sovereign state: United Kingdom
- Post town: Reigate
- Postcode district: RH2
- Dialling code: 01306
- Police: Surrey
- Fire: Surrey
- Ambulance: South East Coast
- UK Parliament: Dorking and Horley

Leigh /ˈlaɪ/ is a village and civil parish in Surrey, between Reigate, Dorking and Charlwood in the east of Mole Valley district. The village centre is suburban and its remainder is agricultural, interspersed by four satellite clustered localities: Dawesgreen, Bunce Common, Shellwood Cross and Nalderswood which benefit from the amenities of the village and a minority of the remainder is woodland.

== History ==
A hoard of 62 Roman silver denarii was discovered in a field at Swains Farm in 2004. The oldest of the coins dates from 31 BC and the most recent were minted in around 180 AD after the death of the emperor Marcus Aurelius.

Before the Norman Conquest, and in dwindling use afterwards, the village lay within the Reigate hundred. Leigh appears to have been a centre for the Wealden iron industry, and the village was explicitly exempted from a legal prohibition of making charcoal from certain timber types issued by Elizabeth I, so that iron smelting could continue.

== Amenities ==
The village has two pubs, The Plough and The Seven Stars. In the village is a parish church, St Bartholomew's, and the Leigh site for the North Downs Primary School, for school years one to three. There is a recreation ground, home to Leigh Cricket Club since 1900, and a play area for younger children.

== Localities ==
Each of the four communities surrounding the village is subsidiary to Leigh itself. Nalderswood however, including by road, is almost as close to Sidlow, which is a slightly smaller village with fewer amenities.

=== Dawesgreen ===
Separated from Leigh by a buffer of less than 200m to the south, Dawesgreen is a linear settlement on a built-up crossroads including one of the village pubs, and two other listed buildings

=== Bunce Common ===
Bunce Common is on the continuation of the road east from Dawesgreen. It is more dispersed, with plots of lower density, and has a road to Shellwood Cross.

=== Shellwood Cross ===
Shellwood Cross occupies the south-west corner of Leigh civil parish, on slopes by the upper part of the unnamed brook that flows past the east of the village centre and includes three listed buildings, one of which is a barn.

=== Nalderswood ===
Nalderswood is by a little knoll known as the Mynthurst. The Deanoak Brook is a second tributary of the Mole, itself a tributary of the Thames, and is separated from the existing line of buildings forming most of Nalderswood by the Little Mynthurst rise.

== Demography and housing ==
The 2011 United Kingdom census shows an increase of more than 8% in population from 856, ten years previously. The proportion of households in Leigh who owned their home outright was within 4% of the borough and 12% above the national average. The proportion who owned their home with a loan was 1% greater than the national average; providing overall a higher proportion than average of rented residential property and of social housing than the national average, and above the average in Surrey.

2011 Census Key Statistics
Output area	Population	Households	% Owned outright	% Owned with a loan	Area (hectares)
Leigh CP	943	370	42.4	33.8	1382

The proportion of households in the civil parish who owned their home outright compares to the regional average of 35.1%. The proportion who owned their home with a loan compares to the regional average of 32.5%. The remaining % is made up of rented dwellings (plus a large % of households living rent-free).

2011 Census Homes
Output area	Detached	Semi-detached	Terraced	Flats and apartments	Caravans/temporary/mobile homes	Shared between households
Civil parish	202	121	23	21	3	0

The average level of accommodation in the region composed of detached houses was 8%, the average that was apartments was 22.6%.

== Local government ==
At Surrey County Council, one representative represents the Dorking Rural division which includes Leigh.

Surrey County Councillor
Election	Member	Party (if any)	Electoral Division
2021	Helyn Clack	Conservative Party	Dorking Rural

At Mole Valley District Council, Leigh forms a part of Capel, Leigh, Newdigate & Charlwood ward which has three councillors.

Mole Valley District Councillors
Election	Member	Party (if any)	Ward
2024	Dineke van den Bogerd	Liberal Democrats	Capel, Leigh, Newdigate & Charlwood
2024	Jo Farrar-Astrop	Liberal Democrats	Capel, Leigh, Newdigate & Charlwood
2024	Kirstie Havard	Liberal Democrats	Capel, Leigh, Newdigate & Charlwood

== Notable residents ==
- André Previn (1929–2019), pianist, composer and conductor, lived in Leigh.
