= St Joseph's Church, Dorking =

Coordinates: 51.225679°N 0.336368°W

St. Joseph's Church
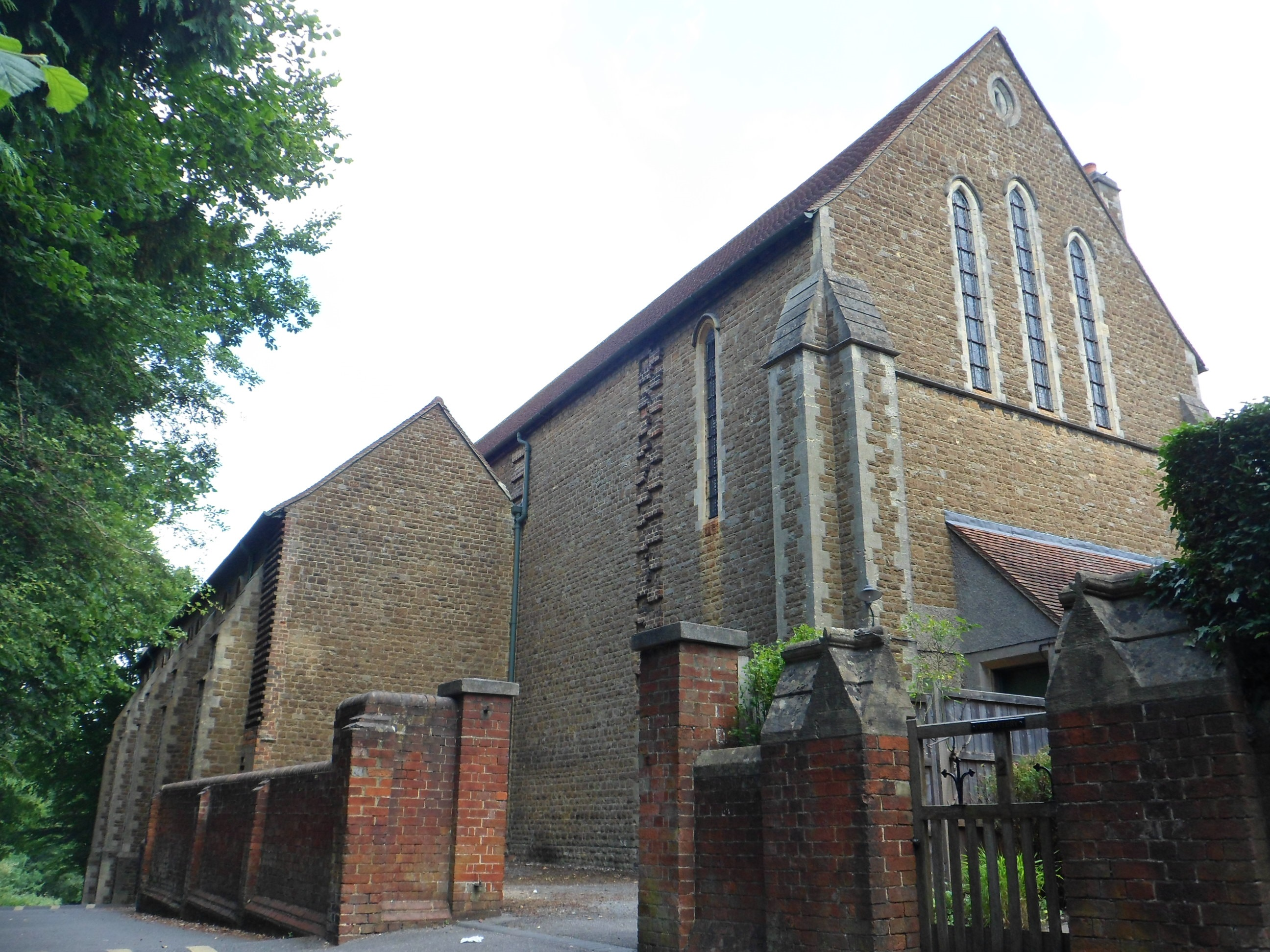

- Location within Surrey
- OS grid reference: TQ 16263 48702
- Location: Dorking, Surrey
- Country: England
- Denomination: Roman Catholic
- Website: SJCC.org.uk

History
- Status: Active
- Founded: 1872
- Dedication: Saint Joseph

Architecture
- Functional status: Parish church
- Completed: 1895

Administration
- Province: Southwark
- Diocese: Arundel and Brighton
- Deanery: Epsom

Clergy
- Bishop: Right Rev Richard Moth
- Priest: Fr Simon Hall

St Joseph's Church is a Roman Catholic Church in Dorking, Surrey. It was founded in 1872 with help from the Duke of Norfolk. It is situated in Falkland Grove in the town. It is the only Catholic parish church in Dorking and is served by the Diocese of Arundel and Brighton.

== History ==
=== Foundation ===
Historically, the Dukes of Norfolk were major landowners in the Dorking area. They were a Catholic family and had their own chaplains, who also served the needs of local Catholics in the 18th and 19th centuries. Henry Fitzalan-Howard, 15th Duke of Norfolk originally owned the site of present-day Falkland Grove, and it was there that the duke and duchess financed the building of a church to serve the local Catholic congregation. In 1871 or 1872, a temporary structure was erected to be a church. The "unpretentious structure" stood on Coldharbour Lane. Catholic schools were established soon afterwards.

=== Construction ===
In 1895, the church was rebuilt and the architect Frederick Walters was brought in to design it. It was built in place of the old church and the land was donated by the Duke of Norfolk to the newly created parish. He also made a contribution to the cost of the building. It was built as a memorial to Minna Fitzalan-Howard and is in the Gothic Revival style. The first Mass was celebrated on 26 June 1895.

A statue of Saint Joseph is in the garden next to the church.

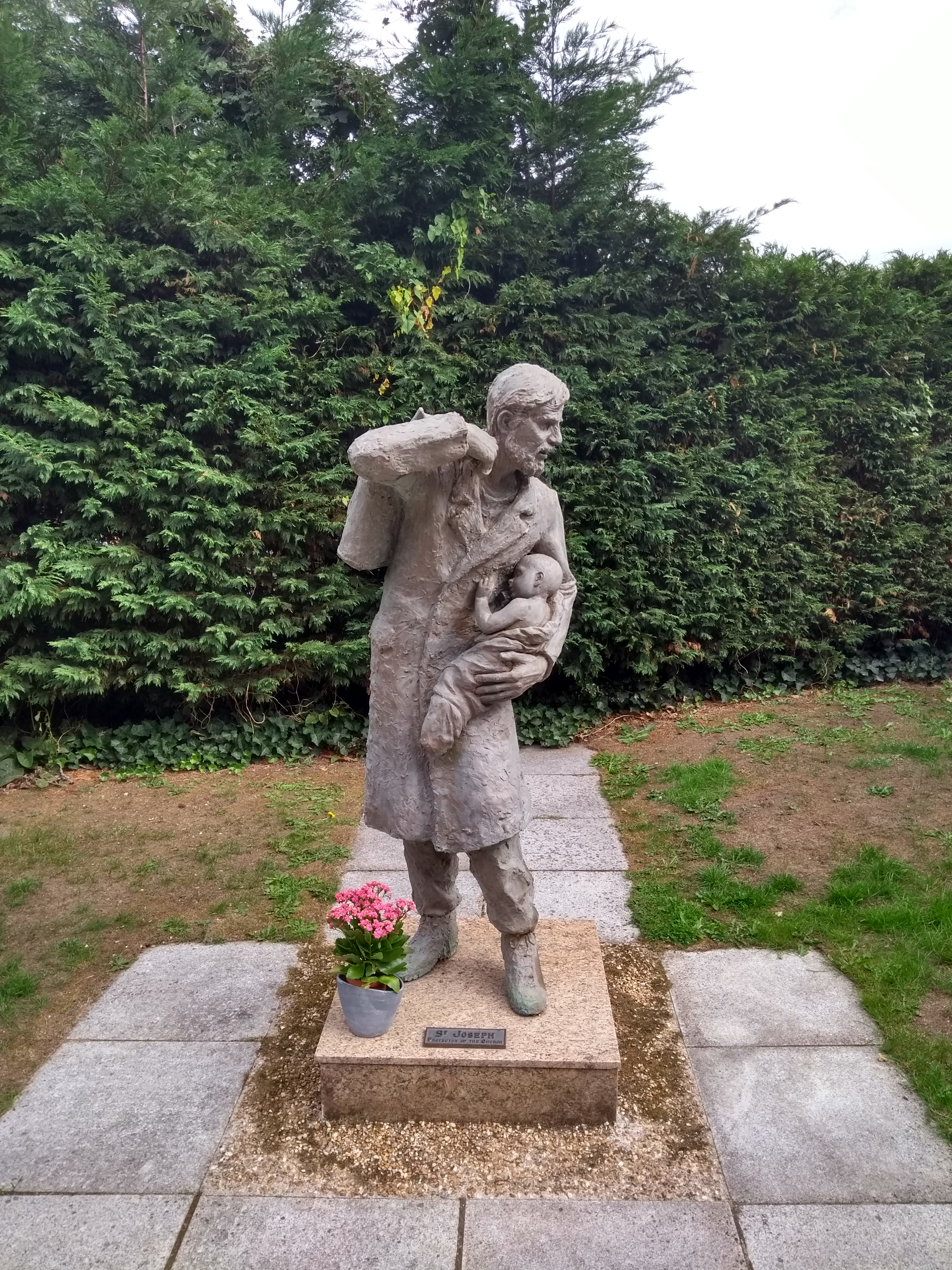
Saint Joseph with the Christ Child

== Parish ==
=== School ===
The church has a close relationship with the nearby St Joseph's Catholic Primary School. St Joseph's is the only Catholic school in Dorking and was founded alongside the church in 1873, also by the Duchess of Norfolk. In 1887, a group of Servite Nuns ran the school and continued to do so until 1970. In that year the school moved to its present site on Norfolk Road.

=== Church ===
From 1 January 2022, the church has two Masses, 6:00pm on Saturday evening and 10:00am on Sunday morning, with varying times for particular occasions, such as Easter and Christmas.

== See also ==
- Dorking
- List of places of worship in Mole Valley

== Bibliography ==
- Kelly, Bernard W. (1907). Historical Notes on English Catholic Missions (PDF). London: Kegan Paul, Trench, Trübner & Co.
