= Brockham =

Village and parish in Surrey, England

Coordinates: 51.233°N 0.286°W

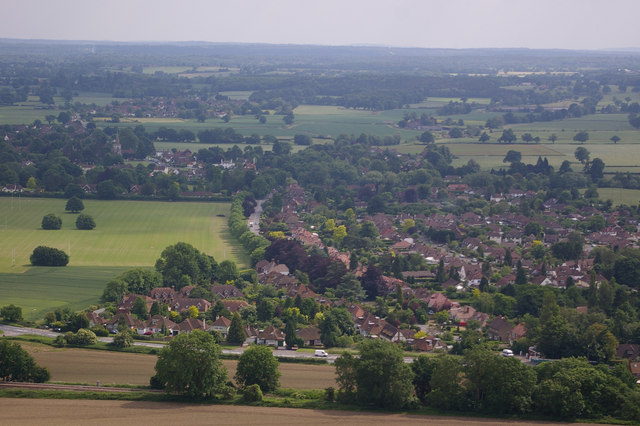
- Brockham viewed from the North Downs Way

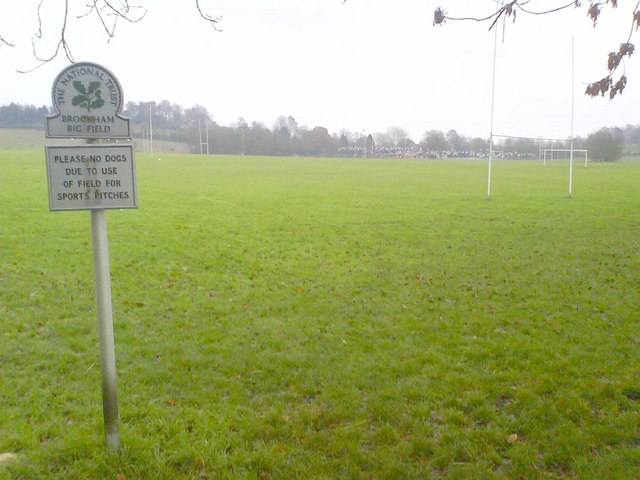
- Brockham Big Field: football and rugby with light surrounding woodland (NT)

- Location within Surrey
- Area: 6.9 km^{2} (2.7 sq mi)
- Population: 2,198 "2021"
  - Density: 319/km^{2} (830/sq mi)
- OS grid reference: TQ2049
- Civil parish: Brockham
- District: Mole Valley
- Shire county: Surrey
- Region: South East
- Country: England
- Sovereign state: United Kingdom
- Post town: BETCHWORTH
- Postcode district: RH3
- Dialling code: 01737
- Police: Surrey
- Fire: Surrey
- Ambulance: South East Coast
- UK Parliament: Dorking and Horley

Brockham is a village and civil parish in the Mole Valley district of Surrey, England. It is approximately 1.5 miles (2.4 km) east of Dorking and 4 miles (6.4 km) west of Reigate. The village lies south of Box Hill, with the River Mole flowing west through the village. At the time of the 2021 census, it had a population of 2,198 .

== Name ==
Brockham, originally 'Brook-ham' (bend in a brook) is so called from the Anglo Saxon meaning 'river meadow by the brook' and is first recorded in 1241.

== Landmarks ==
On a spur of land to the north west of the village stands Betchworth Castle, originally built by Richard FitzGilbert on land granted to him by William the Conqueror soon after the Norman invasion in 1066, but later replaced by a medieval house which was probably built in the mid-to-late 14th century. Only a few ruins survive today.

Christ Church, the parish church is relatively recent in origin, having been commissioned in 1847 by Sir Henry Goulburn, who served as both Chancellor of the Exchequer and Home Secretary.

== Village green ==
The village green is a focal point for the village. Once popular for its cricket matches – WG Grace is said to have played there – it is a focal point of a Guy Fawkes Night bonfire every year on the closest Saturday to 5 November. It has been at times, the UK's largest bonfire and firework display, and was first recorded in 1886. Around 20,000 people gather round the village green, over 4 tonnes of fireworks typically light up the sky and the event is widely regarded by local residents as the highlight of the Mole Valley's calendar. Dorking Rugby Club on Kiln Lane, opens for the event, as the Club House is near to the bonfire. In the 20 years to 2023, almost £450,000 has been raised by the event in aid of local organisations and charities. There is also an annual Victorian fair weekend in mid-July, with a village picnic and live music performances on the Saturday evening, also showcasing local talent.

== Industry ==
Agriculture previously provided most of the employment for villagers, although further work was to be found in the nearby Brockham Hills from the mid-19th century, when they were quarried for chalk and hearthstone – an operation run by the Brockham Brick Company Limited until 1911 and by the Brockham Lime and Hearthstone Company until 1936 when the works closed.

From 1945, Beecham Research Laboratories Ltd (which merged with SmithKline in 1989, then with Glaxo, to become GlaxoSmithKline in 2000) operated from Brockham Park at the southern end of the village. In 1959, Brockham Park became famous when Beecham scientists there discovered the penicillin nucleus, 6-APA (6-aminopenicillanic acid); this discovery allowed the synthesis of a number of new semisynthetic penicillins. In 1959, Beecham marketed pheneticillin, followed shortly by methicillin (or meticillin), which is active against the bacterium Staphylococcus aureus ('golden staph'). In time some bacterial strains developed resistance to these antibiotics, such as the MRSA (for methicillin-resistant Staphylococcus aureus). The site became Beecham's Chemotherapeutic Research Centre. The site is now a housing estate.

In August 2018, retrospective planning permission was granted by Surrey County Council for a secondary oil wellbore in Brockham.

== Education ==
Brockham Primary School merged with The Acorns Infant School in nearby Betchworth in 2010 to create a new combined primary school now named The North Downs Primary School.

== Governance ==
There are three tiers of local government covering Brockham, at parish, district, and county level: Brockham Parish Council, Mole Valley District Council, and Surrey County Council.

Until 1933, Brockham formed part of the civil parish of Betchworth, which was administered as part of the Reigate Rural District. A civil parish of Brockham was created on 1 April 1933 and transferred to the Dorking Urban District. This parish was classed as an urban parish and so did not have its own parish council, but was directly administered by Dorking Urban District Council. Dorking Urban District was abolished to become part of Mole Valley district on 1 April 1974, and the urban parishes it had contained, including Brockham, became unparished areas. A new parish of Brockham, this time with its own parish council, was created on 1 April 1982.

Surrey County Council elected every four years, has one representative, from Buckland for Dorking Rural:

- Helyn Clack, conservative who participates in these committees:
  - Cabinet Member for Community Services and the 2012 Games decisions
  - People, Performance and Development
  - The Mole Valley local committee (obligatory)

The second party forming the main local opposition in the 2013 election, was the Liberal Democrats gaining 1,527 votes versus the winning candidate's 1,810.

2 councillors sit on Mole Valley borough council, who are:

Election	Member	Ward
2011	John Muggeridge	Brockham, Betchworth & Buckland
2010	Paul Potter	Brockham, Betchworth & Buckland

== Demography and housing ==
2011 Census Homes
Output area	Detached	Semi-detached	Terraced	Flats and apartments	Caravans/temporary/mobile homes	shared between households
(Civil Parish)	402	505	170	104	10	0

The average level of accommodation in the region composed of detached houses was 28%, the average that was apartments was 22.6%.

2011 Census Key Statistics
Output area	Population	Households	% Owned outright	% Owned with a loan	hectares
(Civil Parish)	2,868	1,191	43.0%	39.2%	690

The proportion of households in the civil parish who owned their home outright compares to the regional average of 35.1%. The proportion who owned their home with a loan compares to the regional average of 32.5%. The remaining % is made up of rented dwellings (plus a negligible % of households living rent-free).
