= Church of St Nicholas, Charlwood =

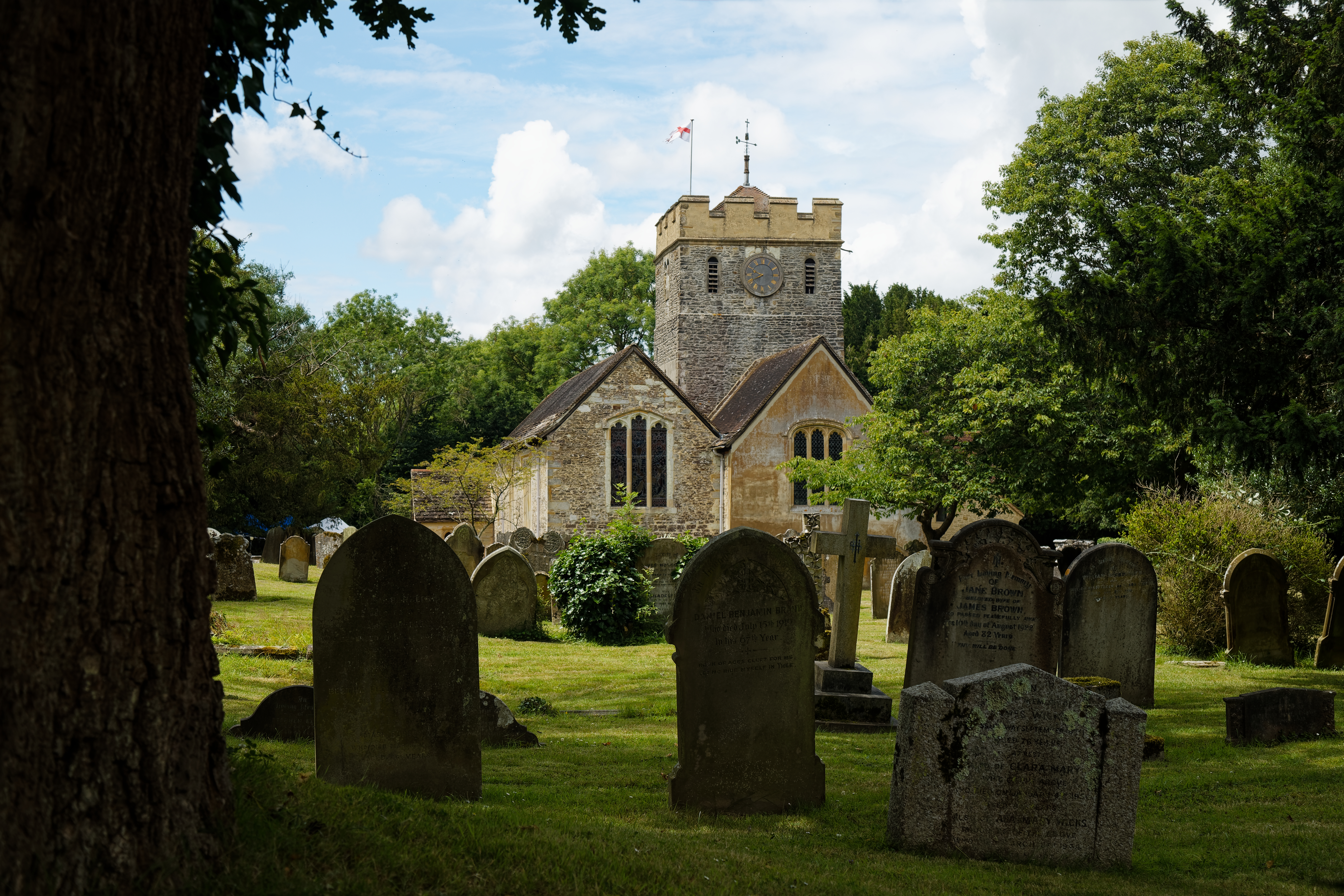
- St Nicholas' church, Charlwood

- Location in Surrey
- 51°09′21″N 0°13′39″W
- Location: The Street, Charlwood, Surrey, RH6 0EE
- Country: England
- Denomination: Church of England
- Website: St Nicholas Church

History
- Status: Grade I listed

Architecture
- Architect: William Burges
- Style: Norman
- Years built: 11th to 15th centuries

Administration
- Diocese: Diocese of Southwark
- Parish: Charlwood

Clergy
- Bishop(s): Rt. Rev. Jonathan Clark (area); Rt. Rev. Christopher Chessun (diocese)
- Rector: Rev. Sue Weakley
- Dean: Rev. Andrew Cunnington

The Church of St Nicholas, Charlwood, is the parish church of Charlwood, Surrey, England. With a 12th-century tower and nave section and examples of 13th to 15th century art, fixtures and architecture, it is a Grade I listed building.

== Building and its setting ==
St Nicholas's smallest nave and the tower were built c. 1080 with an addition in c.1280 and a 15th-century later medieval building forming most of the remainder. Its parts were re-ordered by architect William Burges from 1857 to 1867. The church is a Grade I listed building.

The original church was a simple two-cell structure consisting of a nave and a squat tower without a crossing. The Norman church was enlarged in c.1280 by a new chapel with wall-paintings on the south wall. The church was further enlarged by the addition of a chantry chapel dedicated to Richard Saunders who died in 1480. In 1550 the chapel was converted into a private pew.

Burges was commissioned to undertake restoration in 1858, although work did not begin until 1864 and continued until 1867. During restoration, a series of 13th-century wall paintings were uncovered and Burges undertook their cataloguing and refurbishment. Many interior features are intricately carved and old furnishings are featured: its octagonal pulpit is Tudor and the font is pre- Victorian. In the west window of the former nave are some fragments of ancient glass, a portion of the figure of a saint, and several other odd pieces, including two words of an inscription. Also in the first window of the north wall are two small eyelets containing roses and leaves. Patron Richard Sander (who died in 1480) has his initials, winged dragons and his coat of arms of Sander on the fine screen, originally around his chantry chapel.

The church has a vestry for choir and clergy, and a new church room, known as the Nicholas Room. The church has its graveyard adjoining to almost all sides. On the land to the north is the Old Rectory, with two ponds, one of which is known as the rectory pond, a small fish pond. The Old Rectory was sold in 2022. The path up to the church, in the form of a stone causeway, and the lychgate at the entrance are separately Grade II listed.

The baptism, marriage and death registers date from 1595.

A 25 point/paragraph survey of architectural features and furnishings with plan was written in the Victoria County History in 1911.

== Parish ==
Charlwood is a parish of the Church of England which overlaps its civil parish. This area's nearest town is Horley. The hamlet of Lowfield Heath was moved into West Sussex in 1974. The church is 0.5 miles (0.80 km) from most homes. It is almost encircled by a bend in the low-rise built-up road which has many of the oldest homes facing this rectory and church section. The village has over 80 listed buildings.

=== Parish history ===
The right to appoint the vicar belonged with the manor to the Prior and Convent of Christ Church, Canterbury Cathedral from at least 1231 to 1527. A vicarage instead of a rectory was ordained by the monks before 1308–9 who would thereafter fund that position in exchange for direct receipt of all the rectorial land and the greater and lesser tithes of the rest of the parish. After the loss of Christchurch under Henry VIII's reforms, the rectory resumed and the right to name the rector transferred to Sir Robert Southwell with the manor, as in 1547 he transferred both to Henry Lechford, whose son Sir Richard conveyed the right to Richard Dallender in 1609. In 1615 Dallender quitclaimed to Robert Hatton, from whom in 1622 it returned to the Lechfords. Sir Richard Lechford, when he sold the manor of Charlwood in 1625, retained the right, selling it, however, in 1629 to Edmund Sander of Charlwood Place, by then a far taller, more grandiose manor in the parish.

In 1644 the Bishop was compelled to sequester the priest position to a new rector, the previous incumbent, Thomas Mulcaster, having been proceeded against by 'five or six of the very scum of the parish,' according to his own account. This was during one of the most visible phases of the European wars of religion in England, the Civil War.

His son-in-law, Henry Hesketh, chaplain in ordinary to Charles II, was afterwards rector of Charlwood. In 1661 Edmund Sander devised all his lands and tenements here including the property of the rectory, to his sister Elizabeth Bradshaw, from whom they passed to her cousin Sir William Throckmorton, who sold in 1672 to Sir Andrew King. In 1716 the rectory and its appointment right were conveyed to Henry Wise from according to Owen Manning the trustees of Francis Aungier, 1st Earl of Longford the intermediate owner. The property remained with the Wises until 1884, during which time the church was often served by members of that family and passed to the Rev. E. M. Gibson and some time after him it vested in the diocese.

Extraterritorial diocese

In terms of its relevant see of a bishop, Charlwood was 'a peculiar of Canterbury' until 1846, when it was transferred to Winchester. By the rearrangement of dioceses in 1878 it was again transferred to Rochester and was added to Southwark on its creation.

== See also ==
- Diocese of Southwark
- List of places of worship in Mole Valley
