= Reigate Windmill =

There are two windmills standing today in Reigate. They are:-

- Reigate Heath Windmill.
- Wray Common Mill.
