= Grade II* listed buildings in Reigate and Banstead =

Reigate and Banstead shown within Surrey

There are over 20,000 Grade II* listed buildings in England. This page is a list of the 23 Grade II* listed buildings in the district of Reigate and Banstead in Surrey. For links to similar articles in relation to the other 10 districts of Surrey see Grade II* listed buildings in Surrey.

Name	Location	Type	Completed (Note: The date given is the date used by Historic England as significant for the initial building or that of an important part in the structure's description.)	Date designated	Grid ref. (Note: Sometimes known as OSGB36, the grid reference is based on the British national grid reference system used by the Ordnance Survey.) Geo-coordinates	Entry number (Note: The "List Entry Number" is a unique number assigned to each listed building and scheduled monument by Historic England.)	Image
Alderstead Farmhouse	Merstham	House	18th century	19 October 1951	TQ2990254666; 51°16′35″N 0°08′20″W	1377933	Upload Photo
Banstead Place	Banstead	House	Early 18th century	29 September 1983	TQ2628159249; 51°19′06″N 0°11′21″W	1178257	Banstead Place More images
Browne's Lodge	Reigate and Banstead	House	c. 1780	19 October 1951	TQ2492150374; 51°14′20″N 0°12′43″W	1377963	Browne's Lodge More images
Church of All Saints	Banstead	Church	Late 12th century	24 July 1954	TQ2547159641; 51°19′19″N 0°12′03″W	1029028	Church of All Saints More images
Church of St John the Evangelist	Redhill	Church	Built 1842-43	19 October 1951	TQ2741649387; 51°13′46″N 0°10′35″W	1029141	Church of St John the Evangelist More images
Church of St Katharine	Merstham	Church	Medieval	19 October 1951	TQ2902053798; 51°16′07″N 0°09′07″W	1377942	Church of St Katharine More images
Church of St Mary Magdalene	Reigate and Banstead	Lych Gate	1908	19 October 1951	TQ2595250160; 51°14′12″N 0°11′50″W	1188125	Church of St Mary Magdalene More images
Church of St Peter	Walton-on-the-Hill	Church	15th century	24 July 1954	TQ2237755089; 51°16′55″N 0°14′48″W	1377991	Church of St Peter More images
Fengates House	Redhill	House	Mid 18th century	19 October 1951	TQ2741350343; 51°14′17″N 0°10′34″W	1377968	Fengates House
Flanchford Mill	Leigh	Watermill	Mid 18th century	31 March 1977	TQ2351747960; 51°13′03″N 0°13′58″W	1029111	Flanchford Mill
Gatton Town Hall	Gatton Park	Town hall	18th century	19 October 1951	TQ2745452894; 51°15′39″N 0°10′29″W	1029114	Gatton Town Hall More images
Hartswood Manor	Reigate	House	mid-late 17th century	19 October 1951	TQ2498447664; 51°12′52″N 0°12′43″W	1029104	Hartswood Manor More images
Legal and General House, with hard landscaping including front boundary walls, car park walls, piers and pergolas	Tadworth	House	1986–1991	14 December 2017	TQ2498457002; 51°17′54″N 0°12′31″W	1451212	Upload Photo
Reigate and Redhill War Memorial	Reigate and Banstead	War memorial	1923	18 March 2011	TQ2701350256; 51°14′14″N 0°10′55″W	1242942	Reigate and Redhill War Memorial More images
Reigate Heath Baptist Church (Reigate Heath Windmill)	Reigate and Banstead	Post Mill	1765	19 October 1951	TQ2343550036; 51°14′10″N 0°14′00″W	1029105	Reigate Heath Baptist Church (Reigate Heath Windmill) More images
Ricebridge Farmhouse	Reigate and Banstead	Farmhouse	Early 17th century	19 October 1951	TQ2246248924; 51°13′35″N 0°14′51″W	1029072	Upload Photo
The Baron's	Reigate	House	1721	19 October 1951	TQ2554250287; 51°14′17″N 0°12′11″W	1029142	Upload Photo
The Old Manor	Reigate and Banstead	House	18th century	19 October 1951	TQ2373250994; 51°14′41″N 0°13′43″W	1029144	Upload Photo
The Old Town Hall	Reigate	Town Hall	1728	19 October 1951	TQ2531450249; 51°14′16″N 0°12′23″W	1188608	The Old Town Hall More images
Walton Manor House	Walton-on-the-Hill	House	17th century	24 July 1954	TQ2210955040; 51°16′53″N 0°15′02″W	1029054	Walton Manor House
Wray Common Mill	Reigate and Banstead	House	1977	19 October 1951	TQ2689451084; 51°14′41″N 0°11′00″W	1029127	Wray Common Mill More images
15 and 15a Bell Street	Reigate and Banstead	House	late medieval	19 October 1951	TQ2538150214; 51°14′14″N 0°12′19″W	1029128	Upload Photo
10 Slipshoe Street	Reigate and Banstead	House	17th century	19 October 1951	TQ2502450353; 51°14′19″N 0°12′38″W	1377960	Upload Photo
