= Ann Alexander (banker) =

(1774/5–1861), Quaker, banker and bill broker

- Born: 1770; Eckington, Derbyshire
- Died: 15 January 1861 (aged 90–91); Reigate

Ann Alexander née Ann Barber (1770 – 15 January 1861) was a British Quaker, banker and bill broker. She was unusual because she was a woman running the financial company A.M.Alexander and A. and G.W.Alexander.

== Life ==
She was born in Eckington, Derbyshire. She was a milliner when she met and married the Quaker William Alexander in Doncaster on 13 February 1801. They were to have nine children. Her husband was a bank clerk, but in time he started to deal on his own, and in time, he had a thriving business which relied on trust.

Her husband died suddenly in 1819. At the time of his death, it seemed likely that the family business would be lost too.

Alexander invested the life assurance paid out from her husband's death into the business and took over the leadership. Her husband's executors were convinced by her talents and the business became A.M.Alexander. When her eldest son became an adult in 1823, he was taken into the business, and the following year the business was renamed A. and G.W.Alexander. Her son was however not the leading partner, and he took a third of the profits while she took two thirds.

In 1828 her son became an equal partner, and for four years they shared the profits equally. Her share reduced as new partners were added to the business, but by the time of her retirement in 1838 she still owned a third of the company and had £1000 a year. Her son, George William Alexander, was a noted treasurer of the British and Foreign Anti-Slavery Society.

Alexander died in Reigate and left c. £14,000. The company that she managed went on to become Alexanders Discount plc, and it was still trading in 2000.
