= Reigate Heath =

Nature reserve in Surrey, England

Coordinates: 51.237°N 0.231°W

- Site of Special Scientific Interest
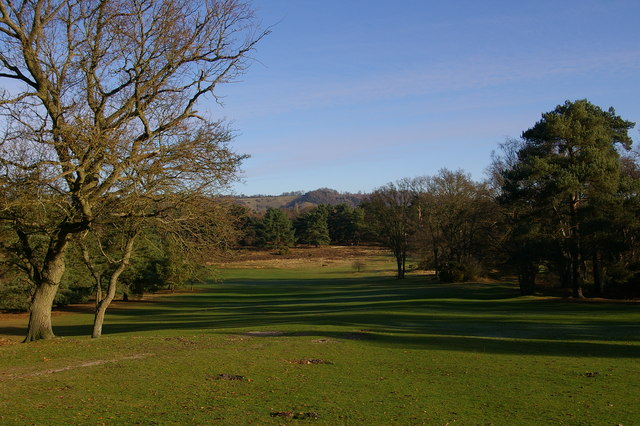
- Location of Reigate Heath.
- Area of search: Surrey
- Grid reference: TQ 236 501
- Interest: Biological
- Area: 61.7 hectares (152 acres)
- Notification date: 1986
- Location map: Magic Map

Reigate Heath is a 61.7-hectare (152-acre) biological Site of Special Scientific Interest west of Reigate in Surrey. An area of 51.6 hectares (128 acres) is also a Local Nature Reserve. Seven bowl barrows dating to the Bronze Age are designated Scheduled Monuments.

Most of the site is heath and acidic grassland, with some areas of woodland and marshy meadow. One part is a golf course. The heath is mainly ling, bell heather and wavy hair-grass. Marshy meadows have Yorkshire fog, sharp-flowered rush, meadowsweet, wild angelica and marsh marigold.

There is public access to most of the site apart from the golf course.
