= Reigate Heath Windmill =

Windmill in Reigate, Surrey, England

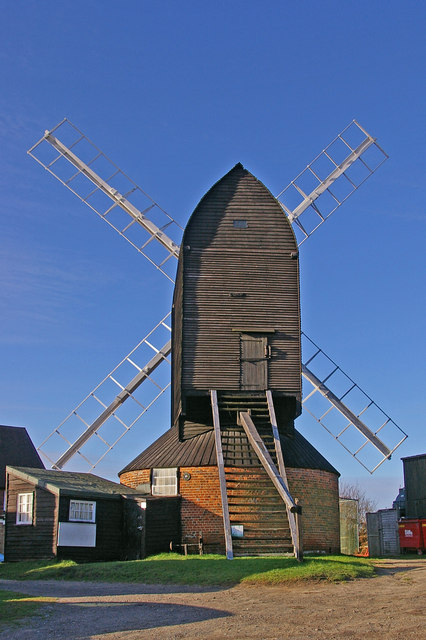
- The mill in 2007

Origin
- Mill name: Reigate Heath mill
- Mill location: Reigate Heath, Surrey, England
- Grid reference: TQ 235 500
- Coordinates: 51°14′10″N 0°13′55″W
- Operator(s): Private
- Year built: c1765

Information
- Purpose: Corn mill
- Type: Post mill
- Roundhouse storeys: Single storey roundhouse
- No. of sails: Four sails
- Type of sails: Double Patent sails
- Windshaft: Wood
- Winding: Tailpole
- No. of pairs of millstones: Two pairs
- Other information: Rounchouse converted to a chapel

Reigate Heath Windmill is a grade II* listed post mill at Reigate Heath, Surrey, England which has been restored and is used as a chapel. It is thought to be the only windmill in the world which is a consecrated church.

== History of Reigate Heath Windmill ==
Reigate Heath Windmill was built c.1765, although a mill was marked on maps dated 1753 and 1762. The mill was last worked by wind in April 1862. In 1880, the roundhouse was converted into a chapel of ease to St Mary's Parish Church, Reigate, the first service taking place on 14 September 1880. The chapel is known as the St Cross Chapel. The mill was offered for sale in 1891, and in 1900 was bought by Reigate Golf Club, who leased the mill back to the church. In 1926, a sail broke. New sails were fitted in 1927 by a millwright from Crawley, and a dummy fantail fitted to the rear of the mill - a feature the mill never had during its working life! The sails blew off in 1943 and were not replaced, although repairs were made to the mill in 1949. Following letters appearing in the Sunday Mirror, a survey was made of the mill in 1952, which revealed that although the roundhouse was in a good condition, the mill was not. Recommendations made included the replacement of the weather beam, which had been penetrated by rot to a depth of at least 3 inches (76 mm).

In 1962, the mill was purchased by Reigate Borough Council, as the Golf Club were finding maintenance of the mill was becoming too onerous. The mill was restored over the next two years and new sails fitted. A church service was held on 18 October 1964, and since May 1965 a service has been held on the third Sunday of each month during the summer. Further restoration took place in 2002, including new sails and repairs and strengthening of the mill. The mill was awarded third place in the 2003 Green Apple Awards.

The first wedding to be performed at the church was by the Rev. Thompson on 22 September 1984. The newly-weds were Diana L. Chiles and Andrew C. Bartlett.

== Description ==
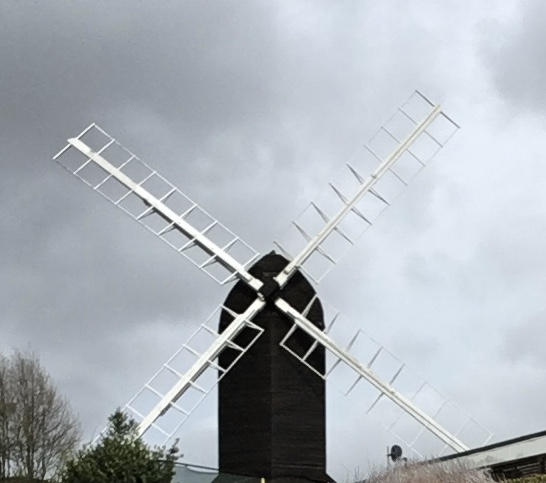
Reigate Heath Windmill in 2024

Reigate Heath Windmill is a post mill with a single-storey roundhouse. Winding is by tailpole. It originally had four common sails carried on a wooden windshaft, with the stones arranged head and tail. It was last worked with four double patent sails carried on a cast-iron windshaft, with the two pairs of millstones arranged side by side in the breast of the mill, driven underdrift by spur gearing. The wooden brake wheel is of clasp arm construction, with 104 cogs. This drove a cast-iron wallower with 33 teeth, carried on a cast-iron upright shaft. The spur wheel is also of cast iron, with 80 cogs. The stone nuts have 23 and 25 teeth respectively.

== Millers ==
- Quayle 1862

References for above:-

== Public access ==
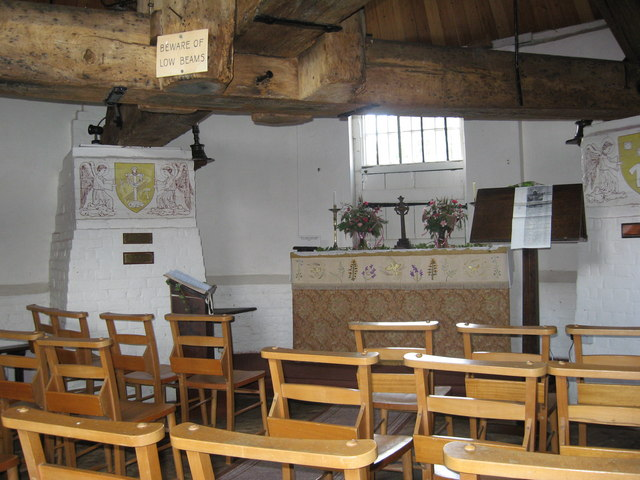
Inside the Mill Church

The roundhouse is open for church services one Sunday of each month during the summer, and there are occasional services at other times.
