= Reigate =

Town in Surrey, England

Coordinates: 51°14′13″N 0°12′22″W

- Town
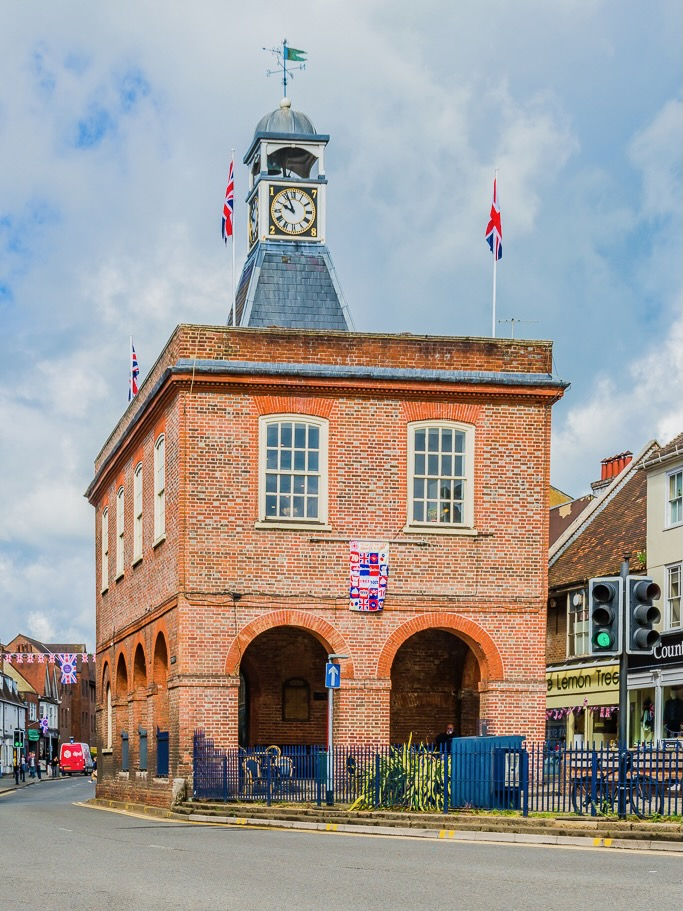
- Old Town Hall, High Street

- Location within the United Kingdom
- Population: 21,820 (electoral definition); 22,123 (built-up area)
- OS grid reference: TQ2649
  - London: 19 mi (30 km) N
- District: Reigate and Banstead
- Shire county: Surrey
- Country: England
- Sovereign state: United Kingdom
- Post town: Reigate
- Postcode district: RH2
- Dialling code: 01737
- UK Parliament: Reigate

Reigate (/ˈraɪɡeɪt/ RY-gate) is a town in Surrey, England. It is sited around 19 miles (30 km) south of central London and 9 mi (14 km) north of Gatwick Airport. The settlement is recorded in the Domesday Book of 1086 as Cherchefelle and first appears with its modern name in the 1190s. The earliest archaeological evidence for human activity is from the Paleolithic and Neolithic; during the Roman period, tile-making took place to the north-east of the modern centre.

A motte-and-bailey castle was erected in Reigate in the late 11th or early 12th century. It was originally constructed of timber, but the curtain walls were rebuilt in stone about a century later. An Augustinian priory was founded to the south of the modern town centre in the first half of the 13th century. The priory was closed during the Reformation and was rebuilt as a private residence for William Howard, 1st Baron Howard of Effingham. The castle was abandoned at around the same time and fell into disrepair.

During the medieval and early modern periods, Reigate was primarily an agricultural settlement. A weekly market began no later than 1279 and continued until 1895. Key crops included oats, hops and flax, but there is no record of rye being grown in the local area. The economy initially declined in the 18th century, as new turnpike roads allowed cheaper goods made outside the town to become available, undercutting local producers. Following the arrival of the railways in the mid-19th century, Reigate began to expand and the sale of much of the priory estate in 1921 released further land for housebuilding.

Reigate is part of the London commuter belt and, since 1974, has been one of four towns in the borough of Reigate and Banstead. The borough council is based at the town hall in Castlefield Road and Surrey County Council has its headquarters at Woodhatch Place. Much of the North Downs, to the north of Reigate, is owned by the National Trust, including Colley Hill, 722 feet (220 m) above ordnance datum (OD) and Reigate Hill 771 feet (235 m) above OD.

== Toponymy ==
In the Domesday Book of 1086, Reigate appears as Cherchefelle and in the 12th century, it is recorded as Crichefeld and Crechesfeld. The name is thought to mean "open space by the hill or barrow".

The name "Reigate" first appears in written sources in the 1190s; similar forms are also recorded in the late medieval period, including Reigata in 1170, Regate in 1203, Raygate in 1235, Rigate in 1344 and Reighgate in 1604. The name is thought to derive from the Old English rǣge meaning "roe deer" and the Middle English gate, which might indicate an enclosure gate or pass through which deer were hunted. It has also been suggested that the "rei" element may have evolved from the Middle English ray, meaning a marshland or referring to a stream; this theory is considered unlikely as the Old English form of this word is ree rather than rey. (Note: The name "Wray Common" is thought to derive from the Old English (at)theree meaning "(at) the stream".)

Woodhatch may derive from the Old English word hæc meaning "gate" and the name may mean "gate to the wood". It is possible, in this instance, that the "wood" referred to is the Weald. In 1623, a survey of the manor of Reigate noted a "Bowling Alley lying before the gate of the Tenement called Woodhatch". Alternatively, the name may derive from that of a local resident: A "Thomas ate Chert" is recorded as living at the settlement in the early 14th century and "Woodhatch" might instead mean "woodland of the ate Chert family".

== History ==
=== Early history ===
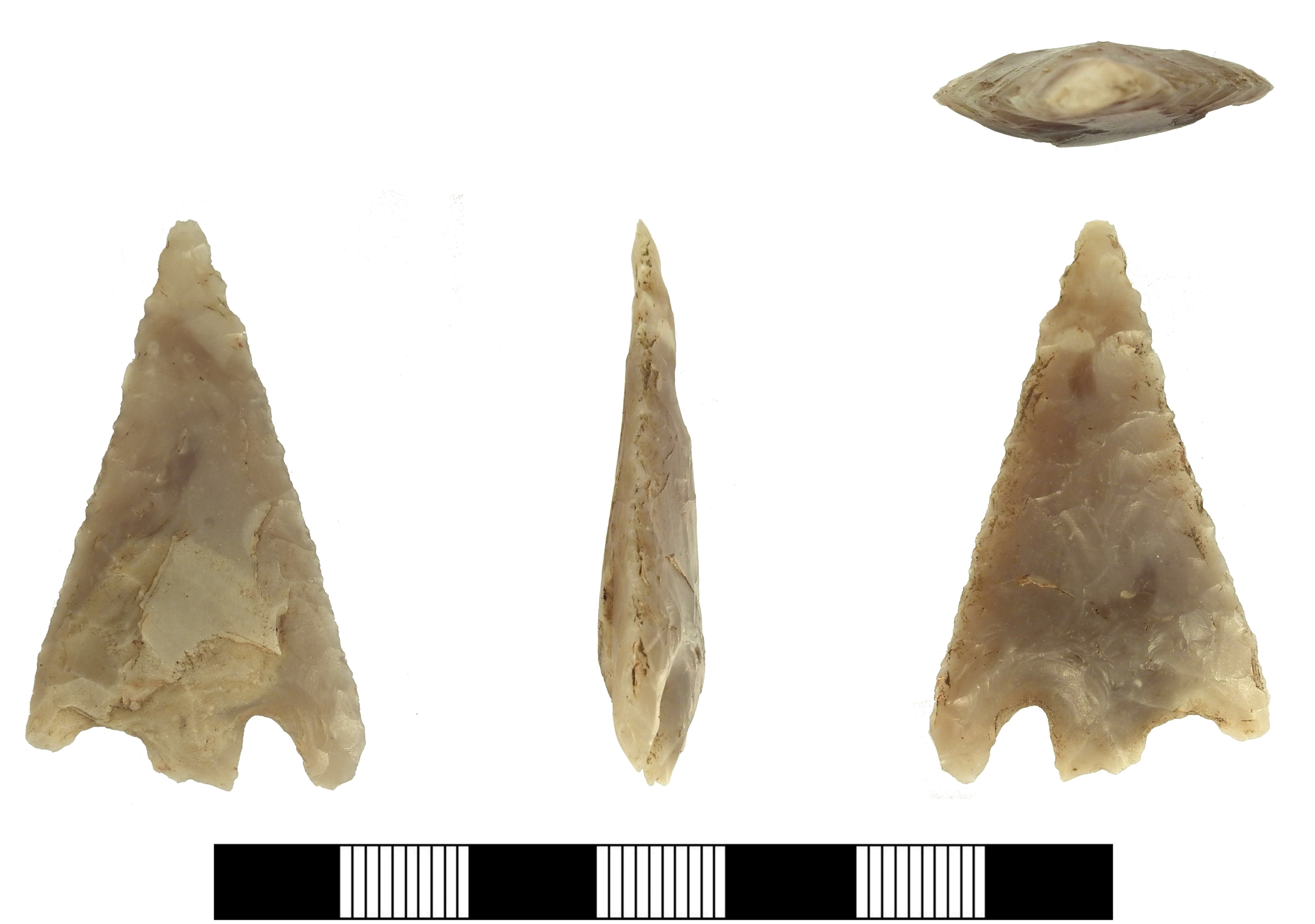
A Bronze Age barbed and tanged flint arrowhead, found in Reigate

The earliest evidence of human activity in the Reigate area is a triangular stone axe from the Paleolithic, which was found in Woodhatch in 1936. Worked flints from the later Neolithic have been found on Colley Hill. Finds from the Bronze Age include a gold penannular ring, dated to c. 1150 – c. 750 BCE, and a barbed spearhead from Priory Park. The eight barrows on Reigate Heath are thought to date from the same period, when the surrounding area may have been marshland.

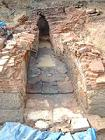
Roman tile kiln excavated in Doods Road

During the Roman period, the Doods Road area was a centre for tile-making. An excavation in 2014 uncovered the remains of a second- or third-century kiln with several types of tile, identified as tegulae, imbrices and pedales. (Note: Roman tiles originating from Reigate have been found in London. It is probable that ceramics were transported to markets in Londinium via Stane Street or the London to Brighton Way to the west and east of the town. The nearest points on the two Roman roads to the Doods Road tilery are around 5.6 mi (9 km) distant.) Artefacts discovered to the south-west of the town centre in 2011 suggest that there was a high-status villa nearby. Coins from the reigns of Vespasian (69–79), Hadrian (117–138), Severus Alexander (222–235) and Arcadius (383–408), indicate that there was Roman activity in the local area throughout the occupation of Britain.

The former name Cherchefelle suggests that the most recent period of permanent settlement in Reigate began in Anglo-Saxon times. The main settlement is thought to have been located in the area of the parish church, to the east of the modern centre, although much of the population was probably thinly dispersed around the parish. Excavations in Church Street in the late 1970s uncovered a Saxon glass jar and remains of a skeleton of uncertain age, but archaeological evidence from this period elsewhere in the town is sparse.

=== Governance ===
Reigate appears in Domesday Book of 1086 as Cherchefelle. It was held by William the Conqueror, who had assumed the lordship in 1075 on the death of Edith of Wessex, widow of Edward the Confessor. The settlement included two mills worth 11s 10d, land for 29 plough teams, (Note: Each plough team was capable of cultivating 120 acres (49 ha) per year, giving a total area of 3,480 acres (1,410 ha) of arable land in Reigate in 1086.) woodland and herbage for 140 swine, pasture for 43 pigs and 12 acres (4.9 ha) of meadow. The manor rendered £40 per year in 1086 and the residents included 67 villagers and 11 smallholders. The Domesday Book also records that the town was part of the larger Hundred of Cherchefelle.

The non-corporate Borough of Reigate, covering roughly the town centre, was formed in 1295. It elected two MPs until the Reform Act 1832 when it lost one. In 1868, Reigate borough was disenfranchised for corruption, but representation in the House of Commons was restored to the town in the Redistribution of Seats Act 1885 (48 & 49 Vict. c. 23).

The manor of Cherchefelle was granted to William de Warenne when he became Earl of Surrey c. 1090 and under his patronage, Reigate began to thrive. The castle was constructed shortly afterwards and the modern town was established to the south in the late 12th century. An Augustinian priory, founded by the fifth Earl of Surrey, is recorded in 1240. By 1276, a regular market was being held and a record of 1291 describes Reigate as a borough. On the death of the seventh Earl, John de Warenne, in 1347, the manor passed to his brother-in-law, Richard Fitzalan, the third Earl of Arundel. In 1580, both Earldoms passed through the female line to Phillip Howard, whose father, Thomas Howard, had forfeited the title of Duke of Norfolk and had been executed for his involvement in the Ridolfi plot to assassinate Elizabeth I. The dukedom was restored to the family in 1660, following the accession of Charles II.

Reforms during the Tudor period reduced the importance of manorial courts and the day-to-day administration of towns such as Reigate became the responsibility of the vestry of the parish church. By the early 17th century, the 5,000-acre (2,000 ha) ecclesiastical parish had been divided for administrative purposes into two parts: the Borough of Reigate, which broadly corresponded to the modern town centre, and "Reigate Foreign", which included the five petty boroughs of Santon, Colley, Woodhatch, Linkfield and Hooley. (Note: The division of Reigate parish into two distinct administrative areas is unusual among Surrey towns.) The two parts were reunited in 1863 as a Municipal Borough with a council of elected representatives chaired by a mayor. The borough was extended in 1933 to include Horley, Merstham, Buckland and Nutfield.

The Local Government Act 1972 created Reigate and Banstead Borough Council, by combining the Reigate Borough with Banstead Urban District and the eastern part of the Dorking and Horley Rural District. (Note: Buckland and Nutfield were transferred to Mole Valley and Tandridge Districts respectively.) Since its inception in 1974, the council has been based in the Town Hall in Castlefield Road, Reigate.

=== Reigate Castle ===
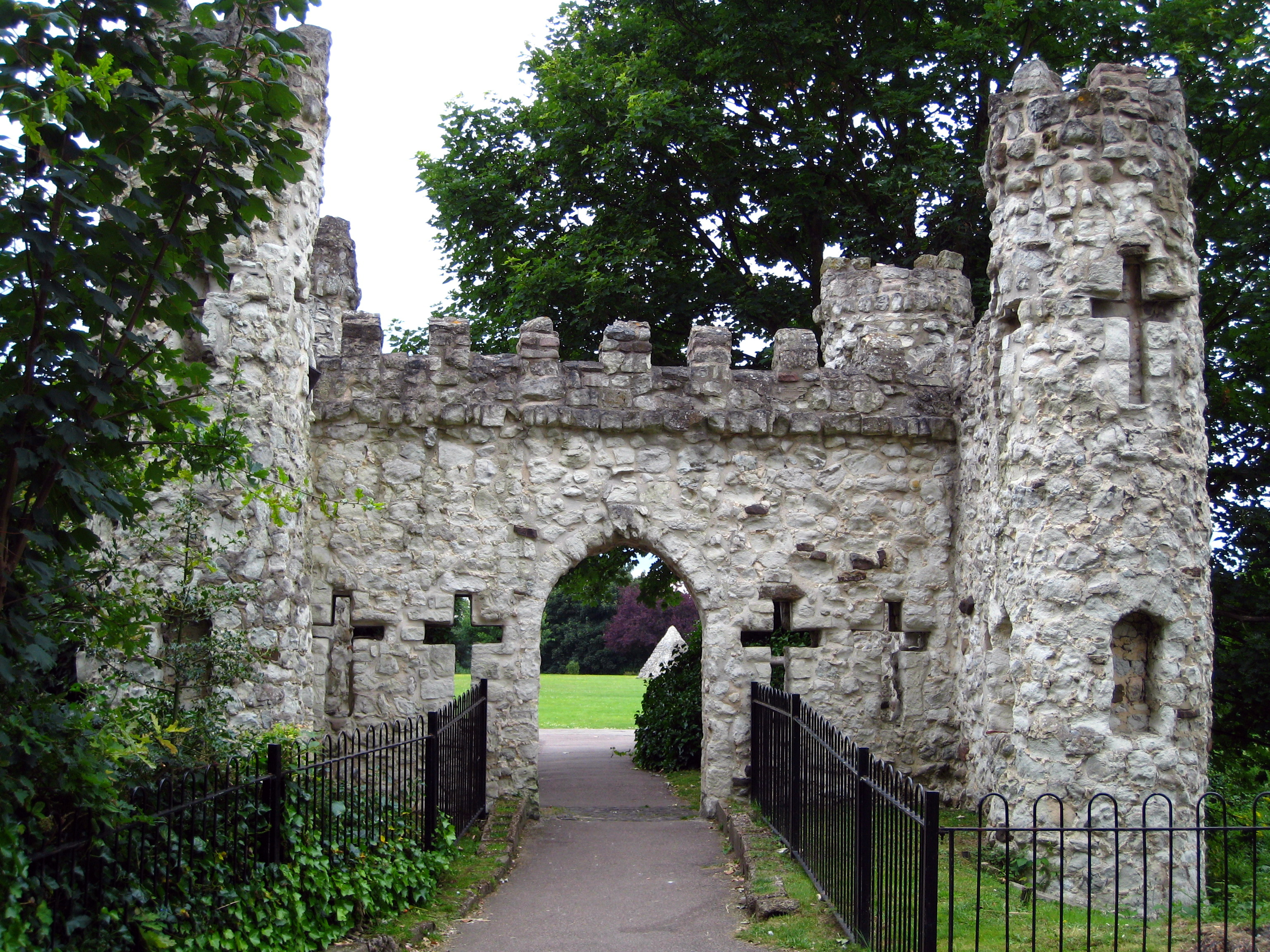
The gatehouse folly was constructed in 1777

Reigate Castle was built in the late 11th or early 12th century, most likely by William de Warenne, 2nd Earl of Surrey. Taking the form of a motte-and-bailey castle, it was originally constructed of timber, but the curtain walls were rebuilt in stone around a century later. A water-filled moat section was dug into the clay on the north side and a dry ditch was excavated around the remainder of the structure. The large size of the motte indicates that the castle was designed both as a fortification and as the lord's residence from the outset. (Note: Local legend says that part of Magna Carta was drafted in the Barons' Cave beneath Reigate Castle in 1215, but the academic consensus is that this story is untrue. The earliest recorded reference to the cave system is from 1586.)

Following the dissolution of the monasteries, the lords of the manor moved their primary residence to Reigate Priory, to the south of the town. The castle was allowed to decay, with only small outlays recorded in the manor accounts for repairs, until 1686, when the buildings were reported as ruinous. Much of the masonry was most likely removed for local construction projects, but in around 1777, Richard Barnes, who rented the grounds, built a new gatehouse folly using the remaining stone. A century later, the borough council was granted a long lease on the property, which had been turned into a public garden. (Note: In late Victorian times, the field to the east of the castle was used as a cricket pitch. A new road, Castlefield Road, was constructed over the field and the Municipal Buildings were built on the west side, opening in 1901.) Regular tours of the caves beneath the castle are run by the Wealden Cave and Mine Society.

=== Reigate Priory ===
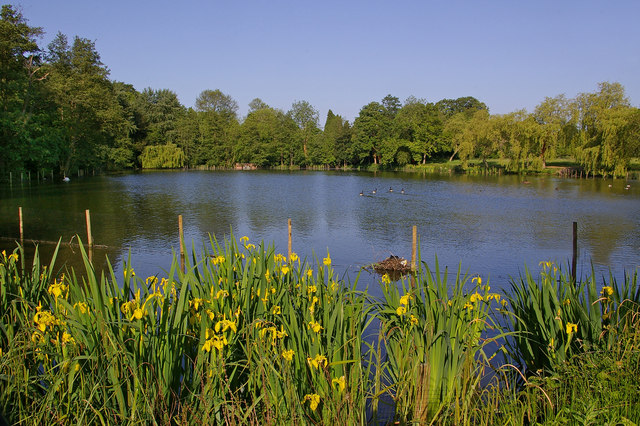
Former fish pond in Priory Park, restored in 2007

William de Warenne, the fifth Earl of Surrey, is thought to have founded the Augustinian priory at Reigate before 1240. Early documents refer to the priory as a hospital, but in 1334 it is described as a convent and thereafter as a purely religious institution. The priory was built to the south of the modern town centre and a series of fish ponds was constructed in the grounds. Although the exact layout is uncertain, the buildings are thought to have been arranged around a central square cloister, with the church on the north side and the refectory on the south.

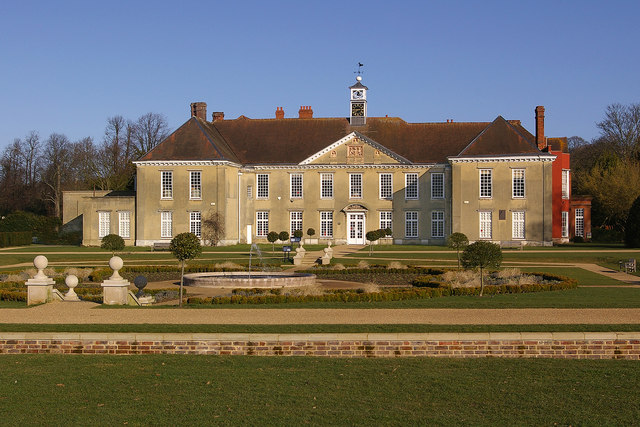
The south elevation of the priory

In 1541, Henry VIII granted the former priory to William Howard, 1st Baron Howard of Effingham, the uncle of Katherine Howard. The old church was converted to a private residence and the majority of the rest of the buildings were demolished. Richard Ireland, who purchased the priory in 1766, is primarily responsible for the appearance of the buildings today. A fire destroyed much of the west wing and Ireland commissioned its rebuilding. Following Ireland's death in 1780, the priory passed through a succession of owners, including Lady Henry Somerset, who remodelled the grounds between 1883 and 1895, creating a sunken garden. Following her death in 1921, the estate was divided for sale and much of the land was purchased for housebuilding.

The final private owner of the house was the racehorse trainer, Peter Beatty, who sold it to the Mutual Property Life and General Insurance Company, which relocated from London for the second half of the Second World War. In 1948, the borough council bought the grounds, having secured them as Public Open Space three years earlier. Also in 1948, the Reigate Priory County Secondary School opened in the main priory building, with 140 children aged 13 and 14. In 1963 the boys moved to Woodhatch School and the Priory School continued as an all-girls secondary school. In 1971, the secondary school closed and Holmesdale Middle School, which had been founded in 1852, moved to the priory.

=== Transport and communications ===
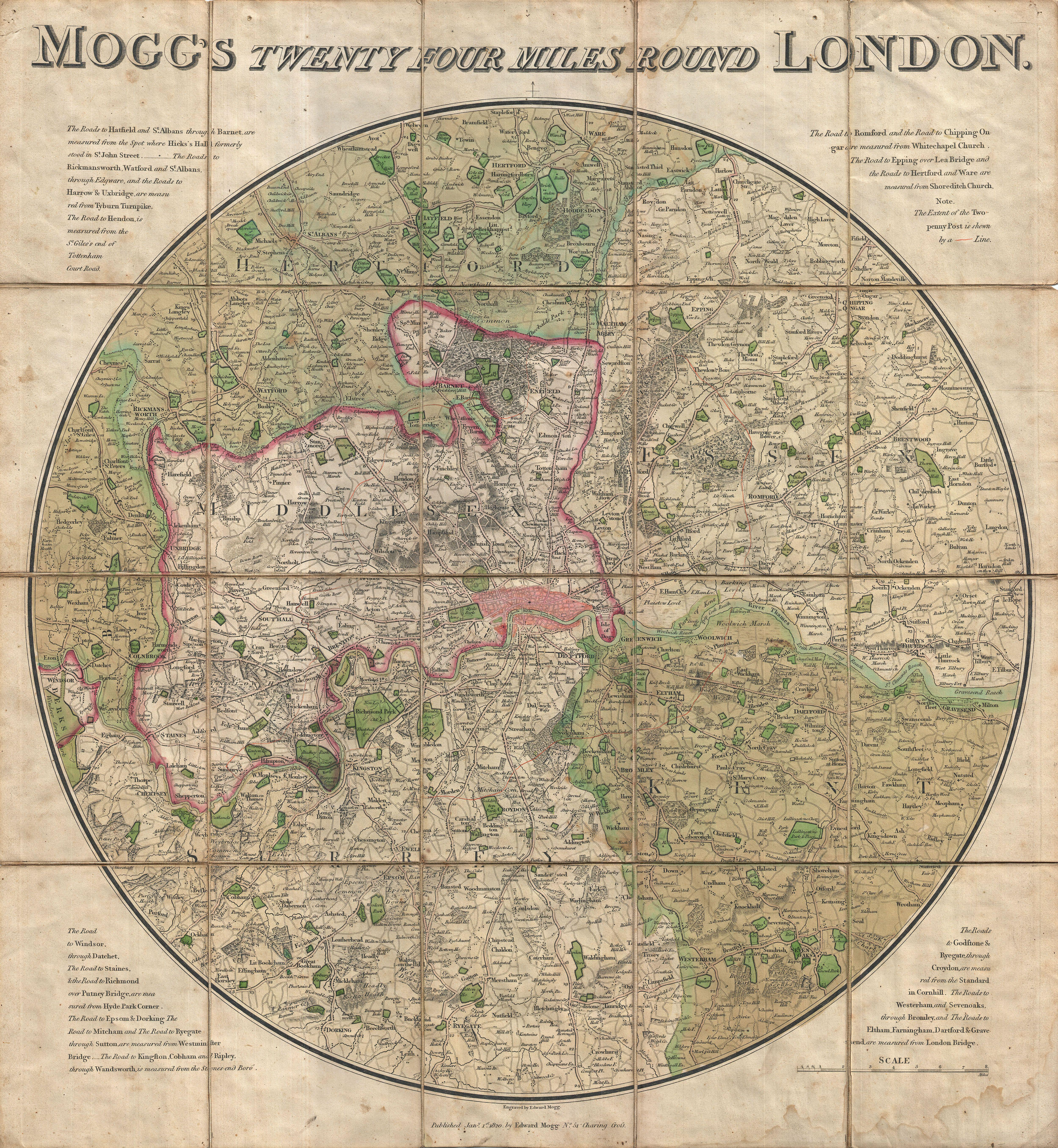
Extract from Mogg's Twenty Four Miles Round London, 1820 showing the turnpike roads through Reigate

In medieval times, the main road north from Reigate followed Nutley Lane, climbing Colley Hill in the direction of Kingston upon Thames, from where produce and manufactured items could be transported via the river Thames. (Note: During the middle ages, goods were generally transported using packhorses, rather than wheeled carts.) (Note: In the medieval and early modern periods, Kingston acted as a "port" for much of east Surrey, from where goods could be distributed via the Thames to London and elsewhere.) Although the direct route to London via Merstham had a less severe gradient, it appears to have been little used for the transport of goods. The manor of Reigate was responsible for maintaining the roads in the local area, but repairs were carried out infrequently and improvements were often only funded by private donations. (Note: In 1466, Richard Jay of Crawley left money in his will to fund repairs to "the weies [ways] of the new causey [causeway] between Crawlei and Reygate".) In 1555, the responsibility for local infrastructure was transferred to the parish and separate surveyors were employed for the Borough and for Reigate Foreign. The inefficiency created by this division resulted in frequent complaints and court cases relating to the poor state of the roads and so, in 1691, local justices of the peace were given the role of appointing the surveyors.

The first turnpike trust in Surrey was authorised by Parliament in 1697 to improve the road south from Woodhatch towards Crawley. The new road took the form of a bridleway, laid alongside the existing causeway between the river Mole crossing at Sidlow and Horse Hill, and was unsuitable for wheeled vehicles. Repairs were also carried out on the route between Reigate and Woodhatch under the same Act. A second turnpike was authorised in 1755, to improve the route from Sutton to Povey Cross, near Horley, which involved creating a new road north from Reigate over Reigate Hill. A cutting was excavated at the top of the hill, using a battering ram to break up the underlying chalk. The new route was completed the following year and the old road via Nutley Lane was blocked at Colley Hill. (Note: On opening, the turnpike over Reigate Hill was so steep that coach passengers had alight and to ascend on foot. In the early 19th century, the base of the cutting was lowered to reduce the gradient and bends in the road were straightened in 1825.) In 1808, a second turnpike to the north was opened to Purley via Merstham. The new trust was required to pay £200 per year to the owners of the Reigate Hill road, in compensation for lost tolls.

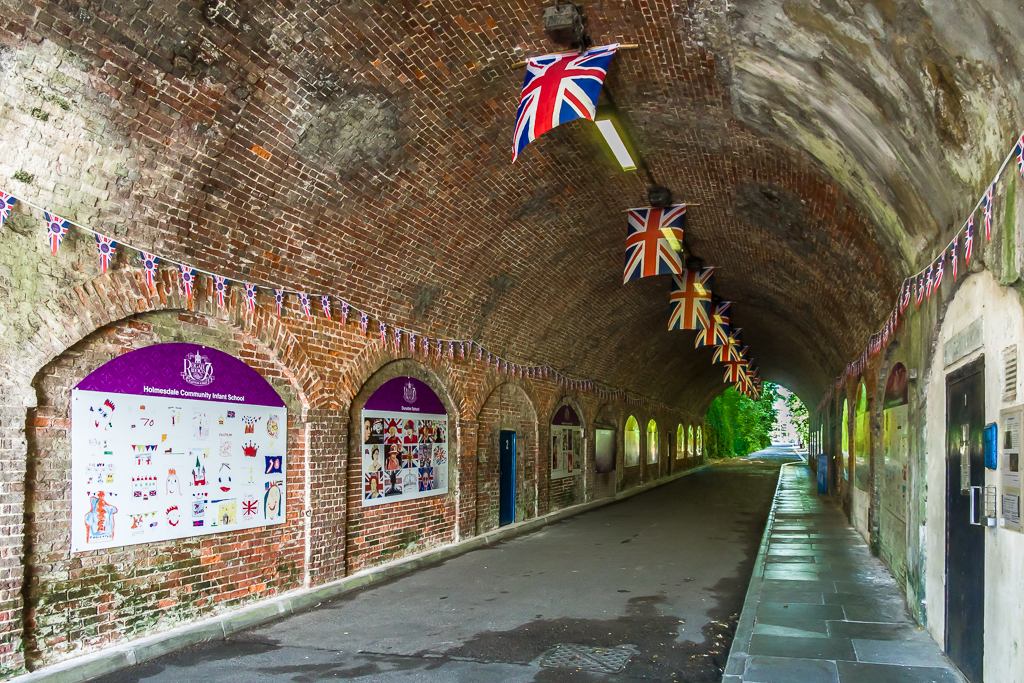
Reigate Tunnel was decorated for the Platinum Jubilee of Elizabeth II (2022)

Two improvements were made to the road network in the town centre in the early 19th century. Firstly, in 1815, the Wray Stream, was culverted to improve the drainage and road surface of Bell Street. Secondly, Reigate Tunnel, the first road tunnel in England, was constructed at the expense of John Cocks, 1st Earl Somers, the lord of the manor. Opened in 1823, it runs beneath the castle and links Bell Street to London Road. It enabled road traffic to bypass the tight curves at the west end of the town centre, but is now only used by pedestrians. The borough council became responsible for local roads on its formation in 1865. The final tolls were removed from the turnpikes in 1881.

The first station to serve Reigate area, on Hooley Lane near Earlswood, opened in 1841. The following year, the South-eastern Railway opened the railway station at Redhill, which was initially named Reigate Junction. The railway line through Reigate was constructed by the Reading, Guildford and Reigate Railway and opened in 1849. It was designed to provide an alternative route between the west of England and the Channel ports; serving intermediate towns was a secondary concern. (Note: Reigate station was known as Reigate Town until 1898.) Electrification of the line between Reigate and Redhill was completed on 1 January 1933.

In February 1976, the M25 motorway was opened between Reigate Hill and Godstone; the section to Wisley via Leatherhead was opened in October 1985.

=== Economy and commerce ===
From much of its early history, Reigate was primarily an agricultural settlement. At the time of the Norman conquest, the common fields covered some 3,500 acres (1,400 ha) and in 1623 the total area of arable land was around 4,500 acres (1,800 ha). From the early 17th century, the manor began to specialise in the production of oatmeal for the Royal Navy, possibly due to the influence of Admiral Charles Howard, who lived at the priory. (Note: 16th and 17th century documents indicate that hops were grown in the local area by smallholders and that flax was important as a secondary crop. There is no surviving record of rye being cultivated in Reigate.) By 1710, 11.5% of the population was employed in cereal processing, but the trade dwindled in the mid-18th century and had ceased by 1786. Until the early 18th century, most goods were traded locally, but thereafter, London is thought to have become the most important market for produce.

The market in Reigate is first recorded in 1279, when John de Warenne, the 6th Earl of Surrey, claimed the right to hold a weekly market on Saturdays and five annual fairs. His son John, the 7th Earl, was granted permission to move the event to Tuesdays in 1313. The original market place was to the west of the castle, in the triangle of land now bordered by West Street, Upper West Street and Slipshoe Street (where the former route to Kingston diverged from the road to Guildford). It moved to the widest part of the High Street, close to the junction with Bell Street, in the 18th century. Cattle ceased to be sold in the late 19th century and the market closed in 1895, in part as a result of the opening of a fortnightly market in Redhill in 1870.

Reigate has two surviving windmills: a post mill on Reigate Heath and a tower mill on Wray Common. In the early modern period, the parish had at least three other windmills and about a dozen animal-powered mills for oatmeal. In addition, there were watermills along the southern boundary of the parish, on the Mole and Redhill Brook.

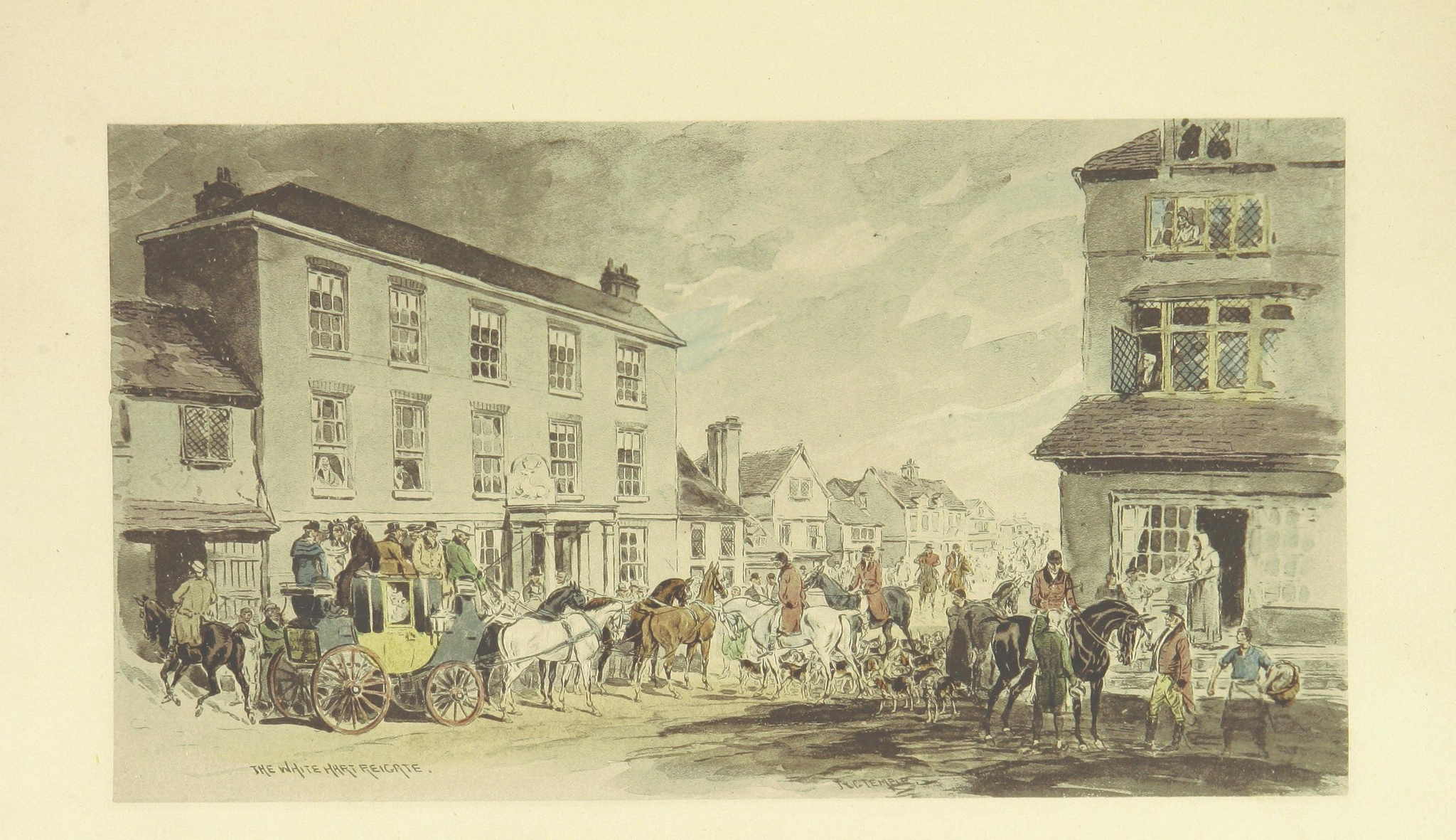
The White Hart pub depicted in a book on the London–Brighton road from 1894

Although the opening of the Reigate Hill turnpike in 1755 provided an easier route to transport produce and manufactured items to London, the new road appears initially to have had a negative impact on the local economy, as goods produced elsewhere became cheaper than those made in the town itself. As a result, there was little growth in the population between the 1720s and 1821. In the late 18th century, the prosperity of the town began to recover as it became as stopping point on the London to Brighton coaching route. (Note: Between July and October 1760, approximately 400 visitors to Brighton passed through Reigate, rising to 2000 over the same period in 1787 and between 12,000 and 15,000 in summer 1811.) In 1793, over half of the traffic on the Reigate Hill turnpike was bound for the south coast and numbers swelled as a result of troop movements during the Napoleonic Wars. The opening of the turnpike through Redhill, appears to have had little initial impact on the numbers travelling through the town, as travellers preferred to break their journeys in Reigate, rather than bypassing the town to the east.

=== Residential development ===
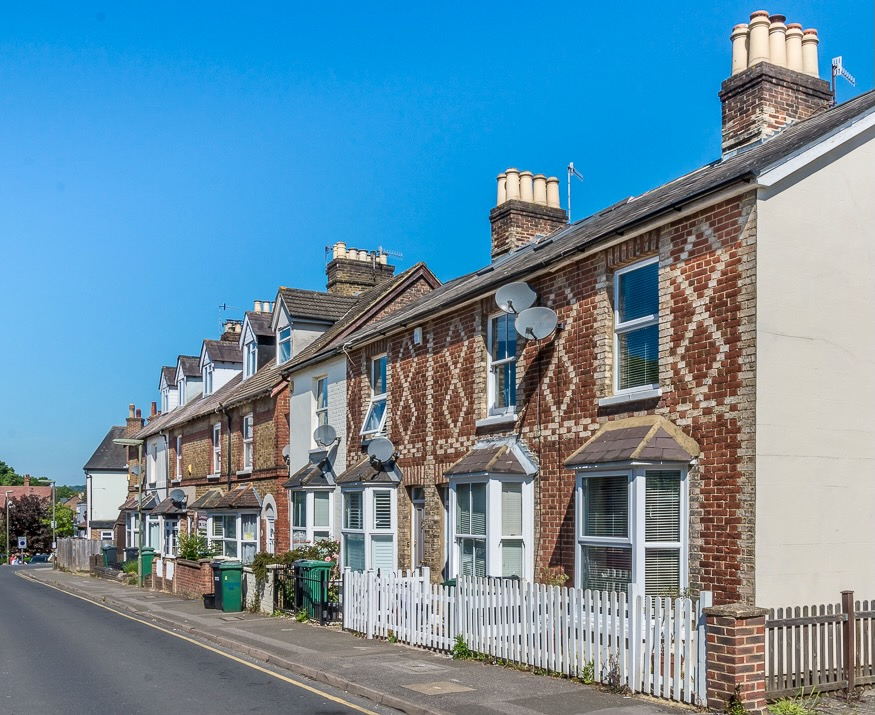
Terraced houses in Doods Road

Reigate began to expand following the arrival of the railway lines in the 1840s. At first, development was focused in the east of the parish. A new settlement, initially known as Warwick Town, was established on land owned by Sarah Greville, Countess of Warwick in the 1820s and 1830s. In 1856, the post office relocated its local branch to the growing village and the area became known as Redhill. Throughout the second half of the 19th century, Redhill expanded westwards towards Reigate town centre and the two towns are now contiguous.

A new residential area was established at Wray Park, to the north of Reigate town centre, in the 1850s and 1860s. St Mark's Church was built to serve the new community. Doods Road was constructed in around 1864 and Somers Road, to the west of the station, followed shortly afterwards. In 1863, the National Freehold Land Society began to develop the Glovers Field estate, to the south-east of the town centre; it also led efforts to build houses at South Park, to the west of Woodhatch.

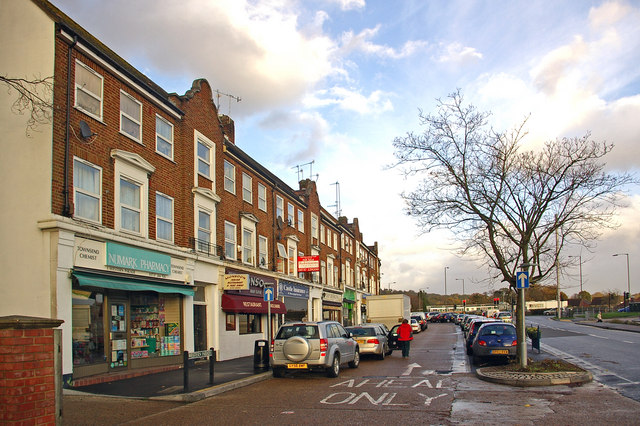
Western Parade, Woodhatch, was built in 1936.

At the end of the 19th century, the estates of several large houses were broken up, releasing further land for development. Glovers and Lesborne Roads, to the south-east of the centre, were developed by the National Freehold Land Company c. 1893. (Note: Glovers Road is named after Ambrose Glover, a leaseholder of the land before it was developed.} The Great Doods estate, between the railway line and Reigate Road, was sold in 1897 and the first houses in Deerings Road appeared shortly afterwards.) A major development occurred in 1921, when the Reigate Priory estate (which included much of the land in the town) was sold, enabling existing leaseholders to purchase the freehold of their properties and freeing up further land for construction.

In the early 20th century, South Park continued to expand to the south and east. The sale of Woodhatch Farm in the 1930s released the land for housebuilding; further expansion occurred in the 1950s, with the construction of council housing on the Rushetts Farm estate.

=== Reigate in wartime ===
Although little fighting took place in Surrey during the Civil War, the Reigate Hundred was required to provide 80 men for the Parliamentarian army, but a force of only 60 was raised, including a captain and lieutenant. Troops were garrisoned in the town and by the summer of 1648, serious discontent was rising in the local area as a result. The Royalist, Henry Rich, 1st Earl of Holland, raised a fighting force and marched from Kingston to Reigate where his men plundered local property and briefly occupied the half-ruined castle. Parliamentary troops under Major Lewis Audley were sent to confront Rich, but he withdrew first to Dorking and then the following day back to Kingston. The withdrawal of the Royalists from Reigate was the final incident in the Civil War south of the Thames before the execution of Charles I in 1649.

In September 1914, Reigate became a garrison town. Members of the London's Own Territorials were billeted locally whilst undergoing training in the area and Reigate Lodge was used as an Army Service Corps supply depot. Reigate railway station was closed between January 1917 and February 1919 as a wartime economy measure.

By the end of the First World War, there were three temporary hospitals for members of the armed forces in Reigate. The Hillfield Red Cross Hospital opened on 2 November 1914, which was equipped with an operating theatre and 50 beds. As well as treating injured soldiers transported home from overseas, the facility also treated troops garrisoned locally. The Kitto Relief Hospital in South Park opened on 9 November 1914, initially as an annex to the Hillfield Hospital but, from 28 September 1915, it was affiliated to the Horton Hospital in Epsom. The Beeches Auxiliary Military Hospital, on Beech Road, was opened in March 1916 with 20 beds, but expanded to 40 beds that October. The hospital relocated to a larger facility in the same road in July 1917 and became affiliated with the Lewisham Military Hospital two months later.

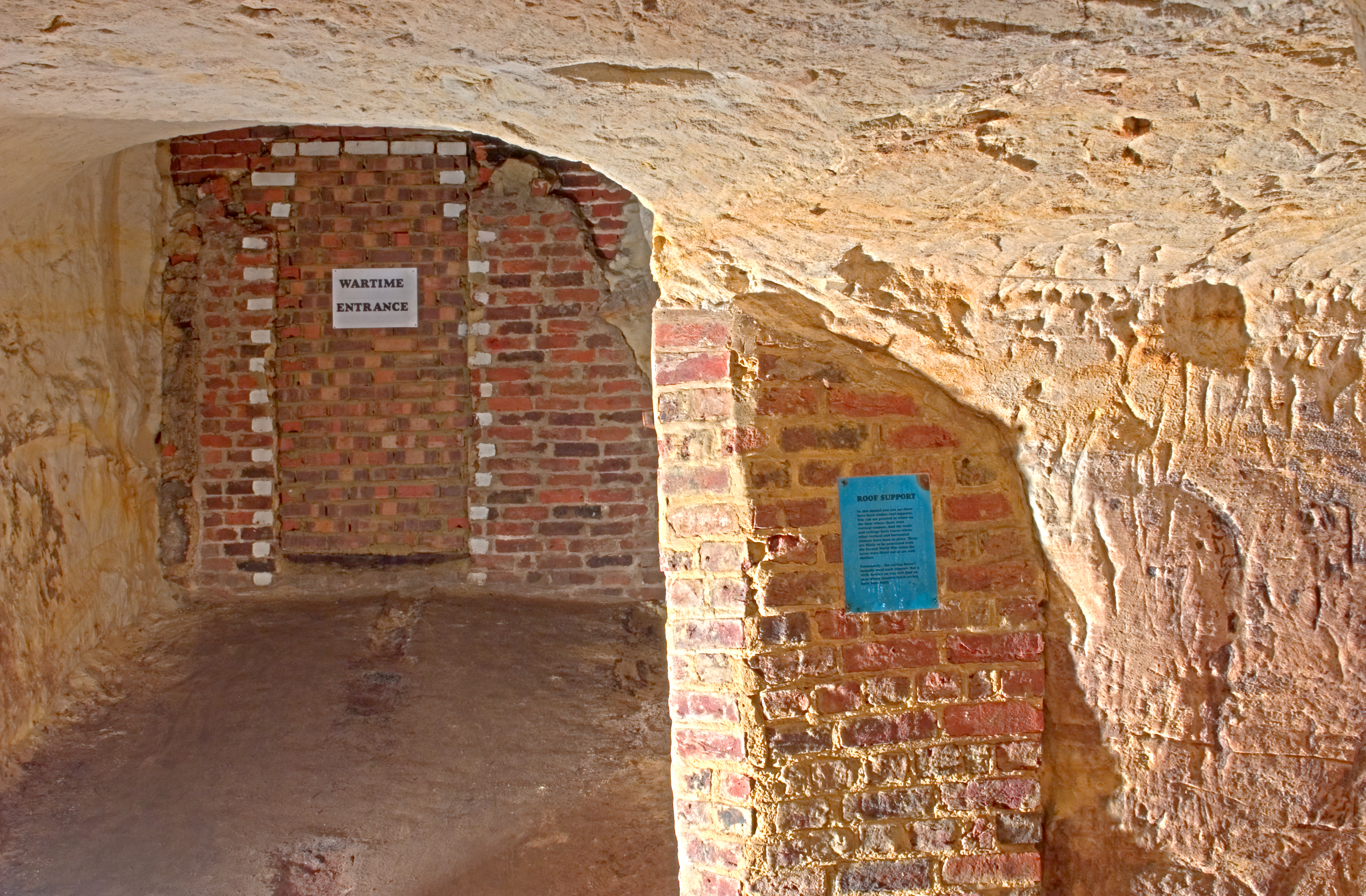
Bricked-up entrance to a Second World War air raid shelter, Tunnel Road

Some 5,000 evacuees from London were sent to the Reigate and Redhill area, at the start of the Second World War in September 1939, but by February of the following year around 2000 had returned home. The caves beneath Reigate Castle were converted for use as public air raid shelters and the first bombing raid on the town took place on 15 August 1940. There was a succession of raids in November 1940, including on the 7th when Colley Hill and Reigate Hill were attacked. Towards the end of the war, in 1944, the Tea House café on top of Reigate Hill was destroyed by a V-1 flying bomb. In total 71 civilians died through enemy action within Reigate Municipal Borough.

For much of the war, Reigate was the headquarters of the South-eastern Command of the British Army. The command was partly housed in purpose-built tunnels beneath Reigate Hill, excavated in 1939 by Welsh miners. The complex consisted of four large underground halls, linked by a network of passageways dug through the chalk. The entrances to the tunnels were destroyed in 1968, after several people had been injured in unauthorised attempts to access the site.

During the Second World War, the defence of the town was primarily the responsibility of the 8th Surrey Battalion of the Home Guard, although the East Surrey Water Company and the London Passenger Transport Board formed separate units to defend local infrastructure. Tank traps in the castle grounds were among the defences installed in the town. Before being deployed to the Western Front, the 1st Battalion of the Hastings and Prince Edward Regiment (part of the Canadian Army, was encamped locally. (Note: Canadian servicemen were injured in September 1940, when two bombs fell at the junction of Evesham Road and West Street.) On 19 March 1945, a U.S. Air Force B17G, returning from a bombing raid in Germany, crashed into Reigate Hill in low-visibility conditions. Two memorial benches, carved in the shape of wing tips, were installed as a memorial at the crash site 70 years later.

== Geography ==
=== Topography ===
The town is in the Vale of Holmesdale, below the North Downs escarpment; the average elevation in the centre is 80 m (262 ft) above OD. The area is drained by the Wallace Brook and its tributaries, which feed the river Mole.

=== Geology ===
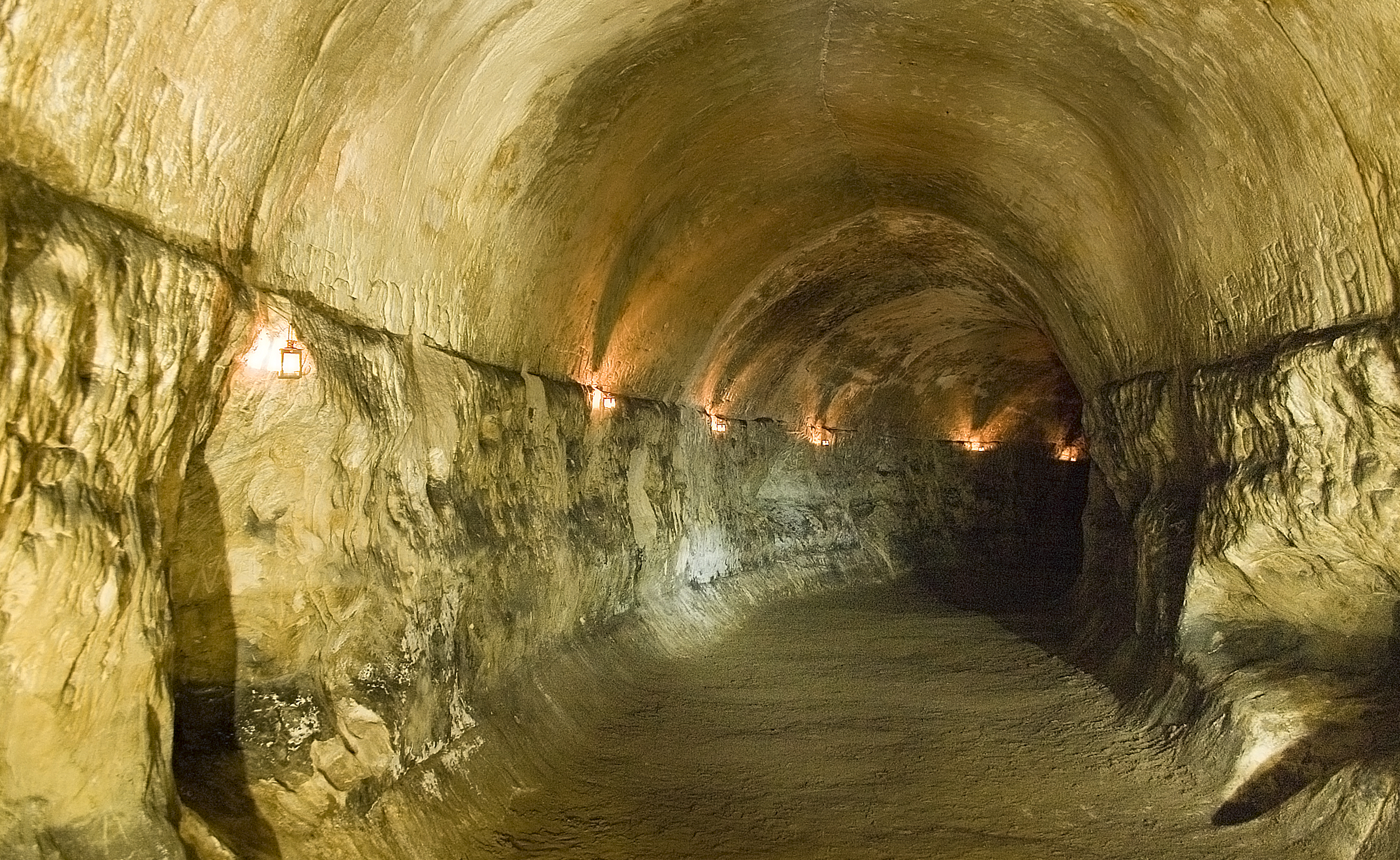
One of the tunnels excavated through the Folkestone Beds beneath Reigate Castle

Woodhatch lies on the Weald Clay, a sedimentary rock primarily consisting of mudstone that was deposited in the early Cretaceous. Much of Reigate is on the strata of the Lower Greensand Group. This group is multi-layered and includes the sandy Hythe Beds overlain by the clayey Sandgate Beds, which together form the high ground of Priory Park. Reigate Heath and the town centre are on quartz-rich Folkestone Beds and the water-filled part of the castle moat is dug into narrow band of clay present in the sandstone. To the north of the railway line is the Gault Formation, a stiff, blue-black, shaly clay, deposited in a deep-water marine environment. At the base of the North Downs is a thin outcrop of Upper Greensand, above which lies the Chalk Group.

Weald clay was dug for brickmaking at Brown's Brickyard in Woodhatch. Building sand was excavated from Barnards Pit, to the west of the town, and at Wray Common Road to the east. Seams of silver sand which occur in the Folkestone Beds were quarried for glass making and the caves beneath the castle may originally have been excavated for this purpose, before being used as cellars. There is also evidence of ironstone extraction in the town, although this practice is thought to have ceased by 1650.

Reigate Stone was mined from the Upper Greensand from medieval times until the mid-20th century and was used in the construction of several local buildings, including the castle, Reigate Priory and St Mary's Church. To the north of the town are the remains of several old chalk pits and lime is thought to have been produced at a site at the base of Colley Hill, although the age of the workings is uncertain.

=== Demography and housing ===
In the 2011 Census, the population of the Reigate built-up area, including Woodhatch, was 22,123.

2011 Census households
	Population	Households	% Owned outright	% Owned with a loan	Hectares
Reigate and Woodhatch	22,123	9,036	34.5	38.5	316
Regional average			35.1	32.5	

2011 Census homes
	Detached	Semi-detached	Terraced	Flats and apartments	Caravans / mobile homes / houseboats	Shared between households
Reigate and Woodhatch	2,487	2,853	1,378	2607	6	9

Across the South East region, 28% of homes were detached houses and 22.6% were apartments.

== Governance ==
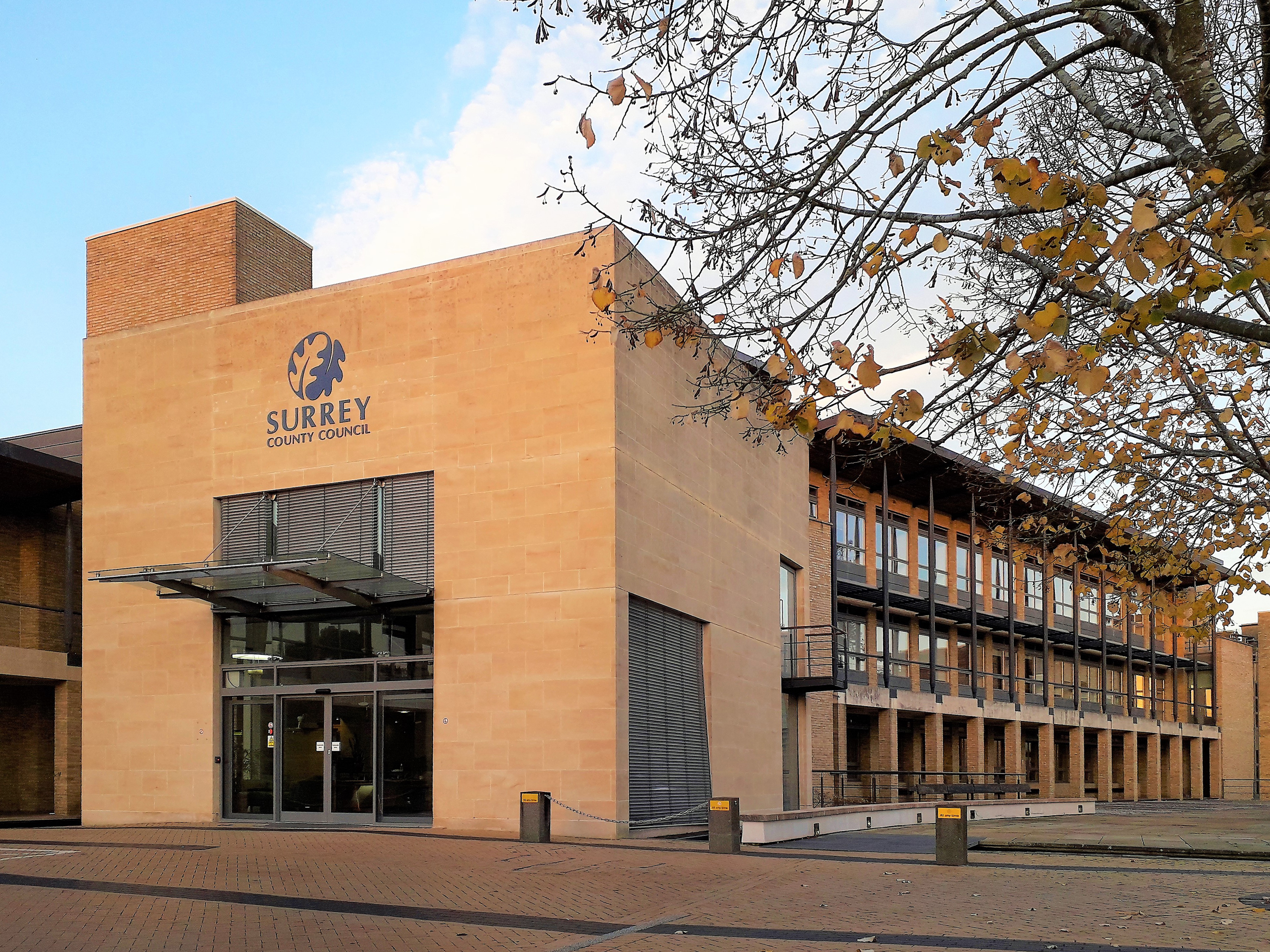
Woodhatch Place

The town is in the parliamentary constituency of Reigate and has been represented at Westminster since July 2024 by the Conservative MP, Rebecca Paul. A previous long-term MP, George Gardiner, was elected in 1974, but defected to the Referendum Party two months before the 1997 general election. Geoffrey Howe, later briefly deputy prime minister under Margaret Thatcher, represented the town between 1970 and 1974.

In January 2021, Surrey County Council moved its headquarters from Kingston upon Thames to Woodhatch Place at 11 Cockshott Hill, in the Woodhatch area of Reigate. Two councillors represent the town, who are elected every four years:

Election	Member	Ward
2021	Victor Lewanski	Reigate
2021	Catherine Baart	Earlswood and Reigate South

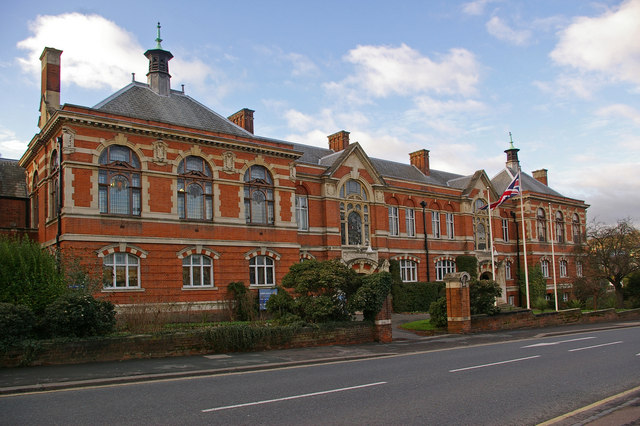
Reigate Town Hall

Six councillors sit on Reigate and Banstead borough council, which operates a council-elected-in-thirds system, allowing electors to vote for one candidate in three out of every four years:

Election	Member	Ward
2014	Michael Blacker	Reigate
2018	Victor Lewanski	Reigate
2023	Kate Fairhurst	Reigate
2016	James King	South Park and Woodhatch
2021	Paul Chandler	South Park and Woodhatch
2022	Andrew Proudfoot	South Park and Woodhatch

== Economy ==
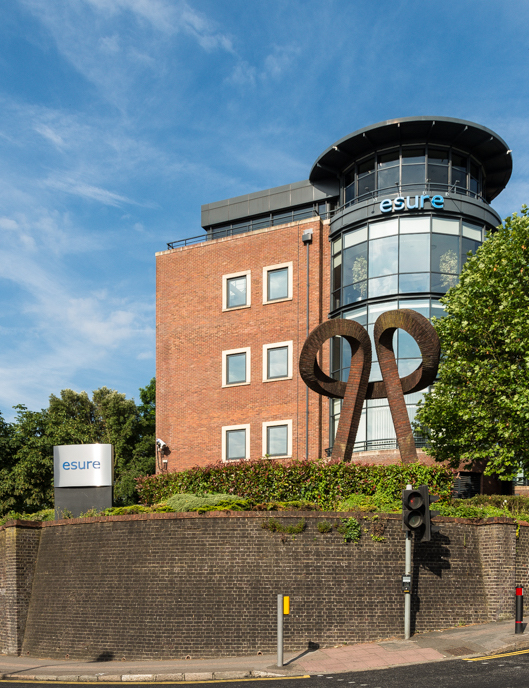
The Observatory; the former Redland plc headquarters is now occupied by esure

The airline Air Europe had its head office in Europe House in Reigate. Redland plc, the FTSE 100 building materials company, was headquartered in the town before its acquisition by Lafarge; its former headquarters are now occupied by the insurance company esure.

Canon UK had its headquarters on the southern outskirts of Reigate. The building, opened by Prince Philip, Duke of Edinburgh in 2000, has won numerous design and 'green' awards.

The European headquarters of Kimberly-Clark are on London Road in the town, just south of Reigate railway station. Further along London Road towards the town centre can be found the former European headquarters of Willis Towers Watson, prior to the merger with Willis, when the global and British headquarters relocated to Lime Street in London.

Pilgrim Brewery was founded in 1982 and moved to West Street in 1984. It was the first new brewery to be established in Surrey for over a century.

== Education ==
=== Maintained schools ===
Dovers Green School and Wray Common Primary School are members of the Greensand Multi-Academy Trust. Sandcross Primary School is part of the Everychild Trust.

Reigate Parish Church Primary School was founded as the Reigate National School. Originally in West Street, it moved to London Road in 1854 and then to Blackborough Road in 1995.

Reigate Priory Junior School traces its origins to a non-denominational school, founded in 1852 in the High Street. It moved to Holmesdale Road in the 1860s and in 1993 moved to the priory, taking over the classrooms previously used by Reigate Priory Middle School. The school educates children between the ages of 7 and 11 and is due to move to new premises on Cockshott Hill in 2023.

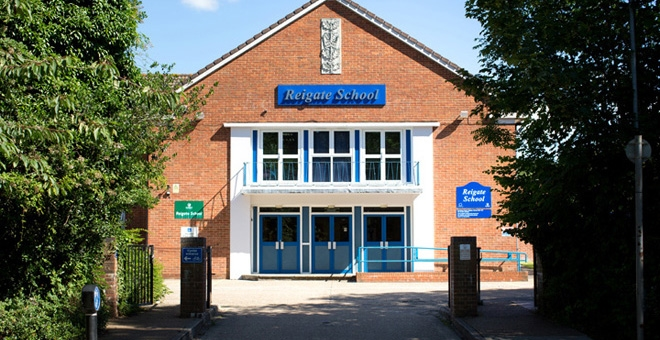
Main entrance of Reigate School

Reigate School is a secondary school in Woodhatch, educating children aged 11 to 16. It is part of the Greensand Multi-Academy Trust. It opened as the Woodhatch County Secondary School in September 1958.

The Royal Alexandra and Albert School traces its origins to an orphanage for children of Dissenters, founded in Hoxton, London in 1759. The orphanage expanded rapidly and, by 1769, had 28 boys and 25 girls between the ages of six and nine in its care; it relocated several times during the following two centuries. In 1943, it was renamed the Royal Alexandra School and was based on a 180-acre (73 ha) site at Duxhurst, near Salfords. A separate institution, the Royal Albert Orphan Asylum was founded near Bagshot in 1864 and admitted its first 100 children in December of that year. It was renamed the Royal Albert School in 1942. The management of the Royal Alexandra and the Royal Albert Schools was merged in 1948, and the new organisation purchased the Gatton Park estate. The following year, an Act of Parliament was passed to formally amalgamate the two institutions. Boarding accommodation was constructed at Gatton Park in 1950 and pupils were relocated from the Bagshot and Duxhurst sites in stages between 1948 and 1954. Today, the Royal Alexandra and Albert School is a maintained boarding school, educating 1,125 children between the ages of seven and 18.

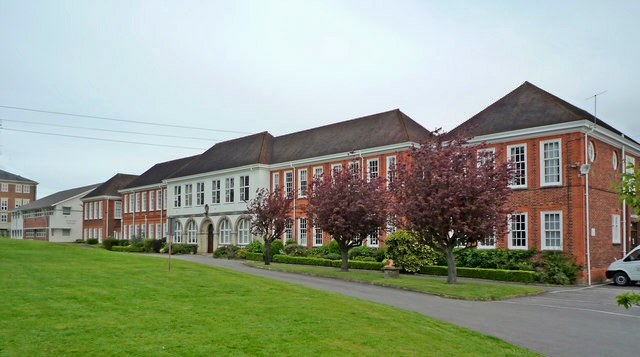
Reigate College

Reigate College is a sixth form college for students aged 16 to 19. It opened in 1976 on Castlefield Road, to the east of the town centre. The main building, constructed in 1927, was previously occupied by the Reigate County School for Girls and was designed by the architecture firm Jarvis and Porter.

=== Independent schools ===
Micklefield School was founded in 1910 and takes its name from its original location, Micklefield House in Evesham Road. It moved to its current site in Somers Road, to the north of the town centre, in 1925. In 2021, Micklefield is a co-educational, independent day school for children aged 2 to 11.

Reigate St Mary's School was founded in 1950 as the choir school for St Mary's Church. Initially for boys only, it became co-educational in 2003, when it was made the principal feeder school for Reigate Grammar School. In 2021, Reigate St Mary's is a day school for children aged 2 to 11.

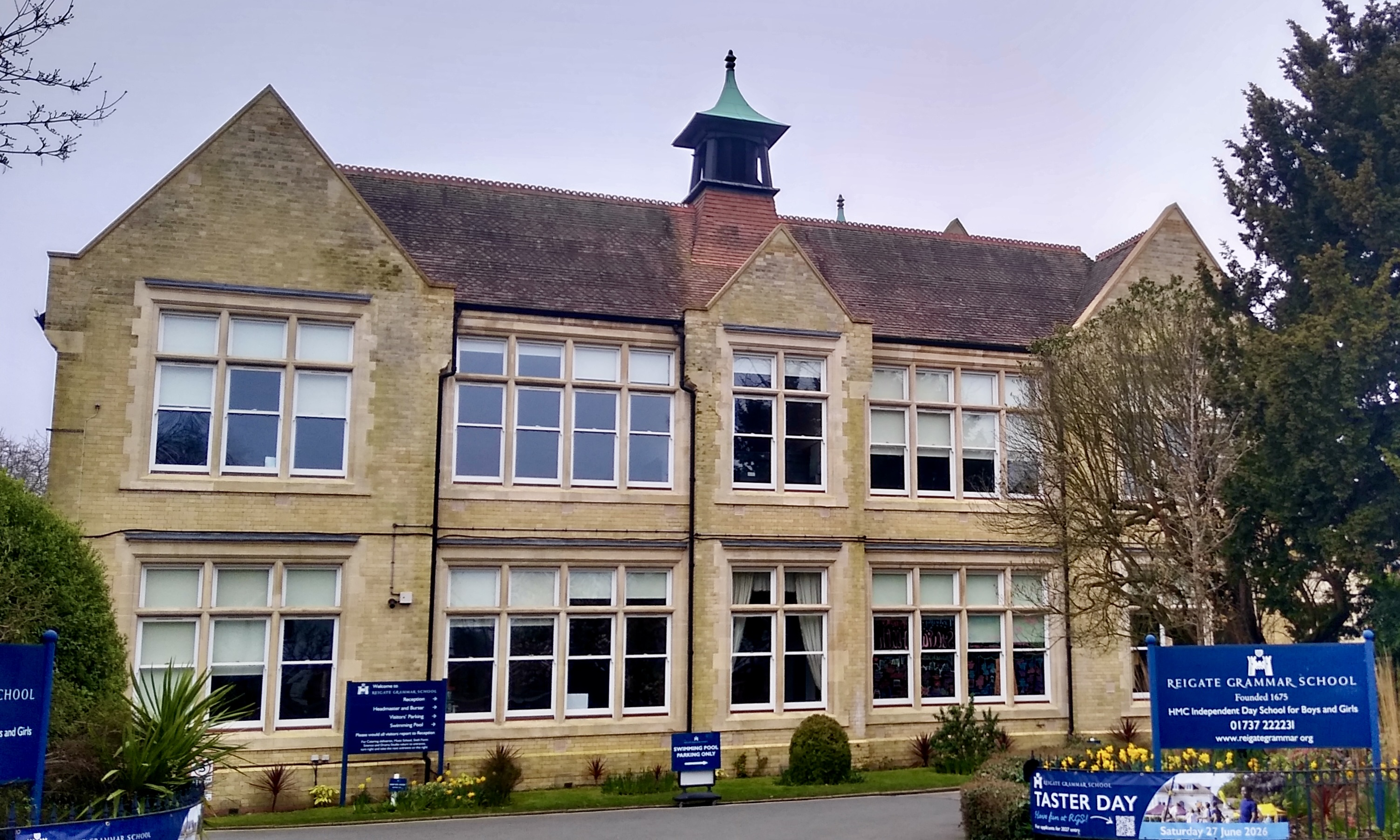
The town's grammar school

Reigate Grammar School traces its origins to 1675, when Henry Smith, an Alderman of the City of London, left a bequest of £150 for the purchase of land for a "free school". The first master, Revd John Williamson, was the vicar of Reigate and for the first two centuries, several headmasters were also parish priests. The school became a grammar school in 1861 and around this time many of the original buildings were replaced. The school was taken over by Surrey County Council under the Education Act 1944, but became independent in 1976. In the same year, girls were admitted to the sixth form and the school became fully co-educational in 1993. It merged with Reigate St Mary's Prep School and Chinthurst School in 2003 and 2017; as of 2021, the three schools together educate around 1,500 pupils aged from 3 to 18. An international division was created in 2017 to work in partnership with the Kaiyuan Education Fund, which aims to establish up to five schools in China.

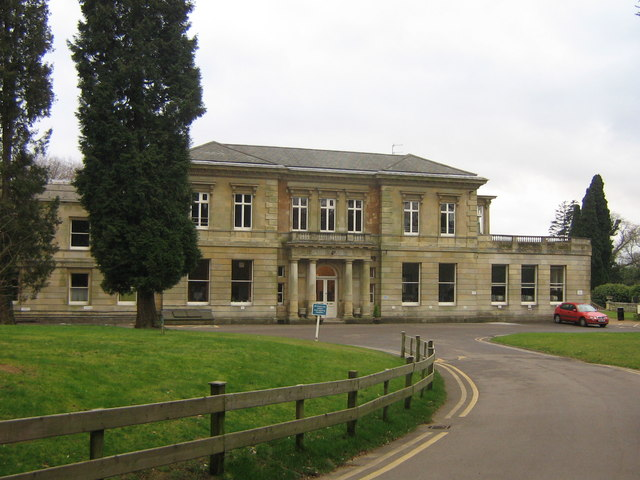
Dunottar School

Dunottar School was founded in 1926 and is named after Dunnottar Castle in Aberdeenshire, where the Scottish Crown Jewels were kept between 1651 and 1660. In 1933, the school moved to its current site, the former High Trees house, which had been built in 1867. In 2021, Dunottar is an independent day school for children aged 11 to 18. It became part of United Learning in 2014.

=== Other schools ===
Reigate Valley College at Sidlow, just south of the town, is a former pupil referral unit that educates pupils who have had behavioural issues in mainstream schools. There are two schools in the town for students with special educational needs: Brooklands School on Wray Park Road and Moon Hall College at Flanchford Bridge near Leigh.

== Public services ==
=== Utilities ===
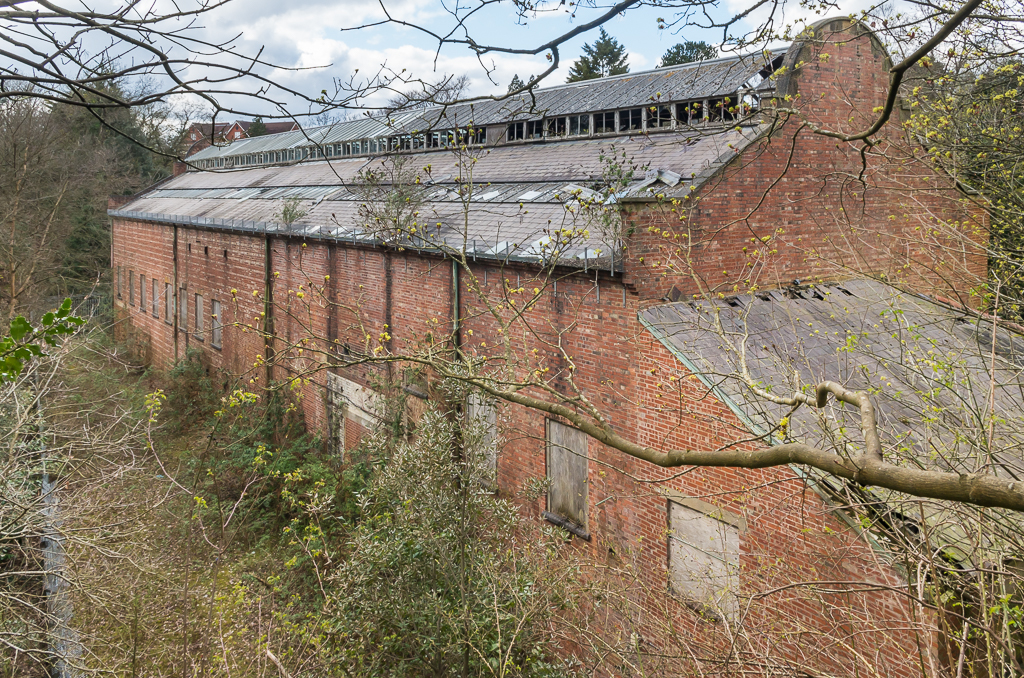
The former Reigate Corporation electricity works, on Wray Common Road

An electricity generating station was authorised by the Reigate Electric Lighting Order 1897 and constructed in a former sand quarry next to the railway line off Wray Common Road. On opening it had an installed capacity of 230W but, by the time of its closure in 1936, the maximum power output had risen to 2.7MW. Under the Electricity (Supply) Act 1926, Reigate was connected to the National Grid, initially to a 33kV supply ring, which linked the town to Croydon, Dorking, Epsom and Leatherhead. In 1939, the ring was connected to the Wimbledon-Woking main via a 132kV substation at Leatherhead.

Reigate Water Works Company was established in 1858. It opened a plant on Littleton Lane the following year, to supply drinking water to the town from the Wallace Brook. It was purchased by the East Surrey Water Company in 1896, which closed the Reigate works after extending its mains network to the town from Caterham. (Note: The Colley Hill Water Tower was built in 1911 by the Sutton District Water Company, following its acquisition of the Kingswood and District Water Company.) The first sewerage system in Reigate was installed in 1876 and included a main outfall sewer running under Bell Street via Woodhatch to the treatment works at Earlswood Common.

Reigate Gas Company was formed in 1838 and opened a gasworks on London Road a year later. Initially it was contracted to supply gas for 28 street lights in the town centre but, by 1860, increasing domestic demand necessitated the opening of a larger facility at the north end of Nutley Lane. In 1921, the Reigate company was taken over by the Redhill Gas Company, which had been formed in 1865.

=== Emergency services ===
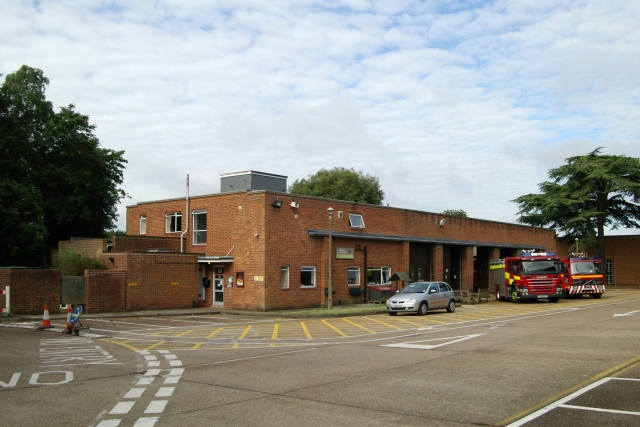
The fire station

The borough police force was founded in 1864 and initially consisted of a superintendent, a sergeant and eight constables. The original police station was in West Street, but was moved to the High Street in around 1866 and to the Municipal Buildings around the turn of the century. A new police station was opened in Reigate Road in 1972, coinciding with the merger of the Borough force with the Surrey Constabulary.

In 1809, two fire engines were presented to the vestry, which was charged with appointing a group of six men to operate it when needed. The brigade was expanded to 12 members in 1854. A new fire station, with a four-storey tower and a pagoda style roof, opened next to the new town hall in Castlefield Road in 1901. The brigade moved to Croydon Road in 1955. In 2021, the fire authority for Reigate is Surrey County Council and the statutory fire service is Surrey Fire and Rescue Service. The Ambulance Community Response Post, located at the fire station, is run by the South East Coast Ambulance Service.

=== Healthcare ===
The nearest accident and emergency department is at East Surrey Hospital, 2.3 mi (3.7 km) away. As of 2023, the GP surgery is in Yorke Road.

== Transport ==
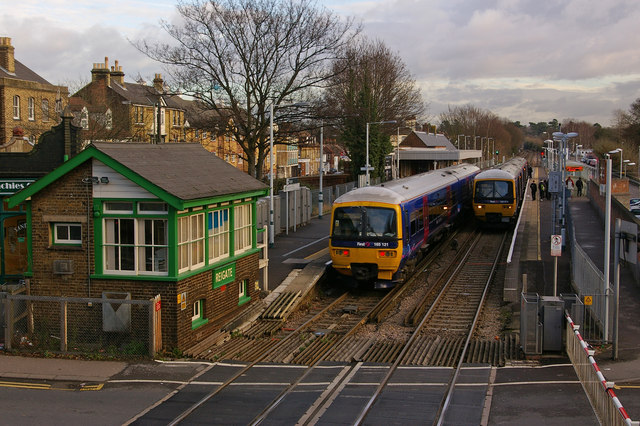
Two GWR trains calling at the station

Reigate railway station is sited a short distance to the north of the town centre; it is served by two train operating companies:

- Southern runs services to London Victoria, via Redhill and East Croydon
- Great Western Railway operates services between Reading, Guildford, Redhill and Gatwick Airport.

Reigate is linked by bus routes to Redhill, East Surrey Hospital, Gatwick Airport and the surrounding settlements in east Surrey. Operators are Metrobus, London General, Compass Travel, Cruisers and Buses 4U.

The Surrey Cycleway passes through Woodhatch. The Greensand Way, a 108 mi (174 km) long-distance footpath, from Haslemere in Surrey to Hamstreet in Kent, passes through Reigate Park to the south of the town centre. The North Downs Way, between Farnham and Dover, runs from west to east across Colley Hill and Reigate Hill.

== Religion ==
=== Church of St Mary Magdalene ===
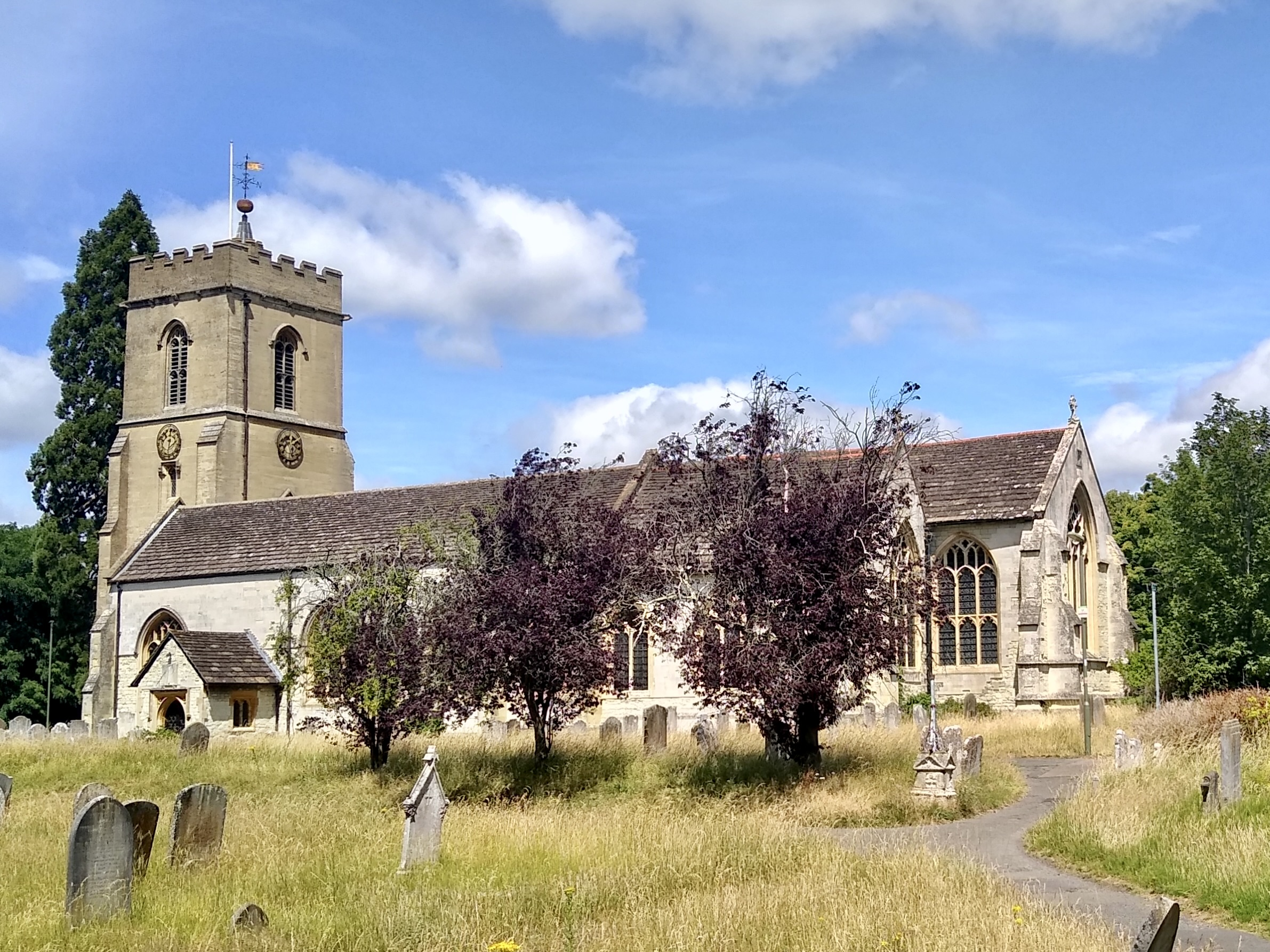
Church of St Mary Magdalene

The first record of a church at Reigate is from the late 12th century, when the church of Crechesfeld was presented to the Priory of St Mary Overie by Hamelin and Isabel de Warenne, the Earl and Countess of Surrey. At the time of the gift, the church is thought to have consisted of a nave, chancel and possibly a central tower. The oldest parts of today's Church of St Mary Magdalene date from c. 1200.

The building was extended several times in the late medieval period, including the additions of the north and south aisles in the mid-late 13th century, the south chancel chapel in the 14th century and the relocation of the tower to the west end in the first half of the 15th century. Two phases of reconstruction took place in Victorian times. In 1845, the architect, Henry Woodyer, was responsible for renewing the local Reigate Stone walls and, in 1874–7, George Gilbert Scott Jr. installed new roofing and refaced the tower in Bath Stone.

The medieval rood screen, separating the chancel from the nave, was restored by Woodyer, who was also responsible for much of the current stained glass. There are several 17th- and 18th-century monuments inside the church, the largest of which is a memorial to Richard Labroke (d. 1730) who is depicted in Roman dress, flanked by the figures of Justice and Truth.

=== Reigate Mill Church ===
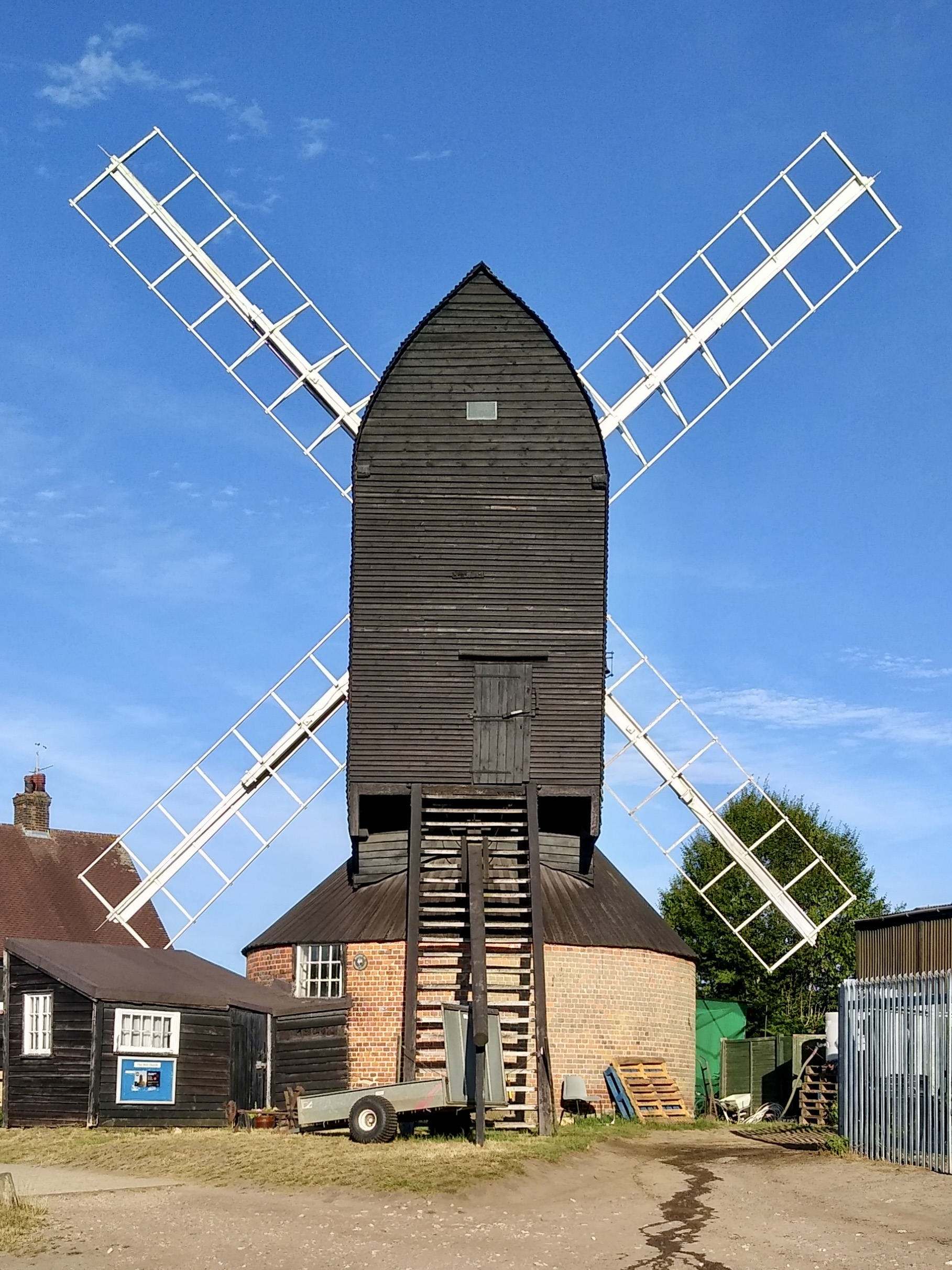
Reigate Mill Church

Reigate Heath Windmill was built c. 1765 and was last worked by wind in 1862. The weatherboarded upper section of the post mill holds the sails and sits above the brick roundhouse below. The roundhouse was converted into a chapel of ease to the Church of St Mary Magdalen in 1880 and services are held in the building during the summer months. It is thought to be the only windmill to be used as a church in England.

=== Reigate Heath Church ===
Reigate Heath Church, on Flanchford Road, was built in 1907 as a chapel of ease to St Mary Magdalen. It is constructed from corrugated galvanised iron and is typical of the tin tabernacles, built around the same time.

=== St Mark's Church ===
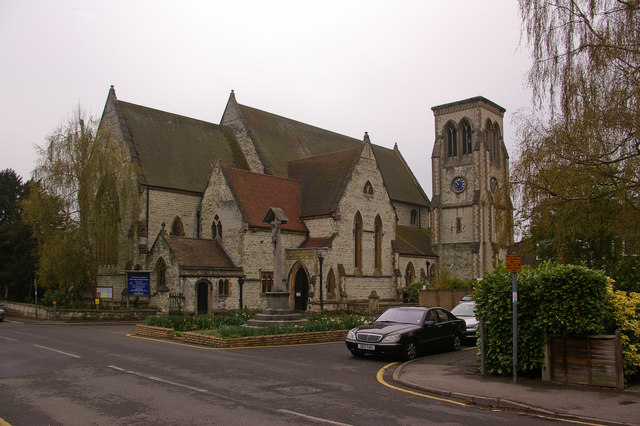
St Mark's Church

St Mark's Church, in Alma Road, was opened in 1860 to serve a new area of housing, under construction to the north of the railway station. It was designed by the architects firm, Field & Hilton, and is built in Reigate stone. The tower and spire were added in 1863, but the spire was demolished in 1919. The church was heavily damaged during the Second World War, necessitating the demolition of the south transept. Most of the windows were destroyed by bomb blasts and a new East Window, designed by Francis Spear, was installed in 1955.

=== St Philip's Church ===
St Philip's Church, which lies to the north-west of the town centre, was built in 1863, originally as a chapel of ease to St Mark's Church. The pulpit dates from 1898 and the reredos was installed in 1919. Following the First World War, the east end of the church was reordered to raise the floor level and the chancel was enlarged into the nave in 1957.

=== St Luke's Church ===
St Luke's Church, to the south of the town, was opened in 1871. It is constructed from Reigate Stone and is built in the Gothic style. The west end was damaged during a storm in the 1960s and the affected wall was replaced by a clear-glazed window. The church was extended to the west, with the addition of an annex, which provides accommodation for the Winter Night Shelter.

=== Reigate Methodist Church ===
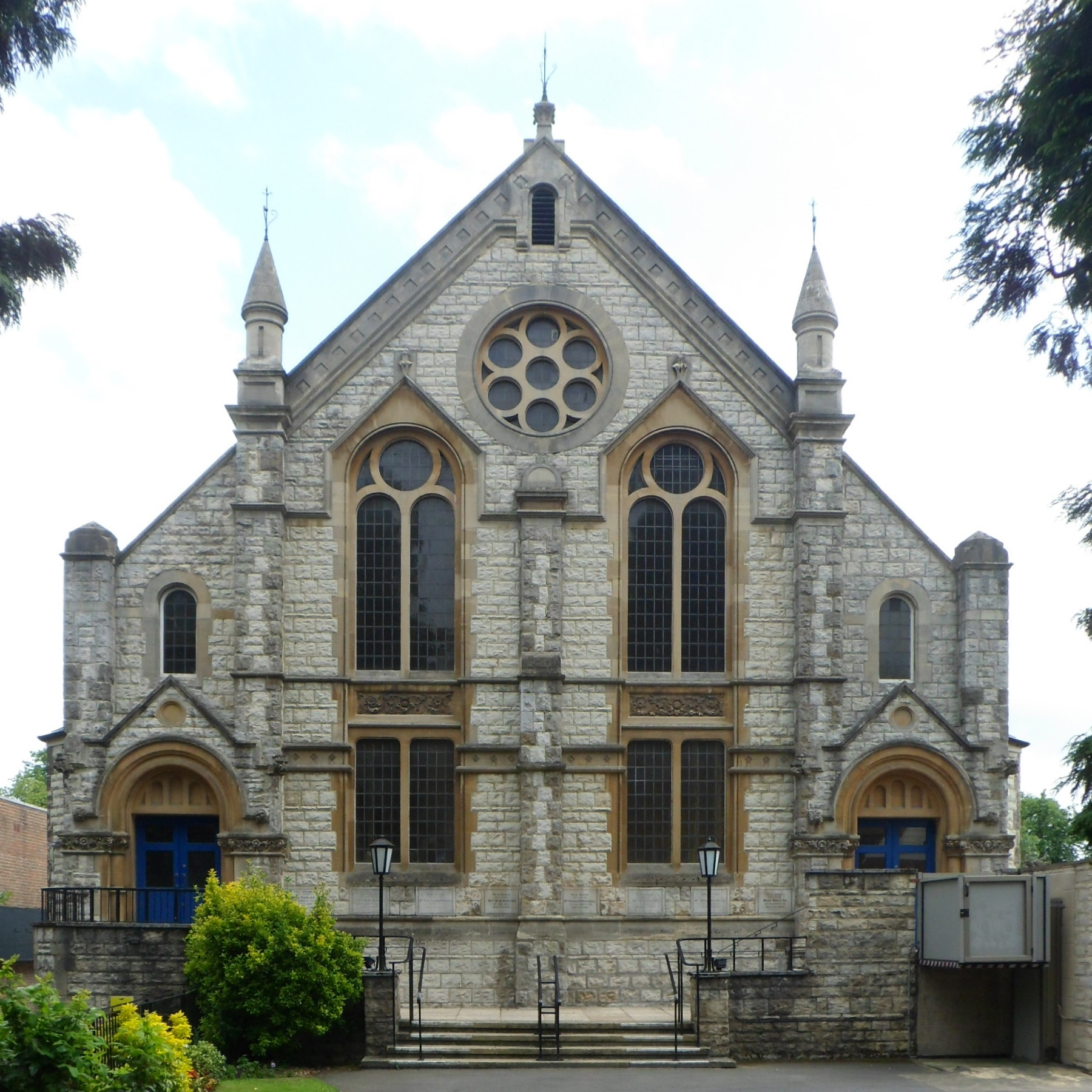
Reigate Methodist Church

Although John Wesley visited Reigate four times between 1770 and 1775, the first Methodist chapel was not established in the town until 1858. The current church, in the High Street, was built in 1884.

=== Catholic Church of the Holy Family ===
The Catholic Church of the Holy Family was built in Yorke Road, on land donated by a local benefactor. It was consecrated in 1939. A mass centre was established in a wooden building in Woodhatch, but was closed in 2003 after almost 50 years of use.

== Notable buildings and landmarks ==
=== Cranston Library ===
The Cranston Library was opened in 1701 and is the oldest public lending library in England. It was intended primarily for the use of the clergy of the Archdeaconry of Ewell, but its remit was expanded in 1708, to maintain a collection of books "for the use and perusal of the Freeholders, Vicar and Inhabitants" of Reigate Parish "and of the Gentlemen and Clergymen inhabiting parts thereunto adjacent." The library is named after its founder, Andrew Cranston, who was the Vicar of Reigate from 1697 to 1708. It is housed on the first floor of the vestry of the Church of St Mary Magdalene. The collection includes over 2000 books, most of which date from the 17th and 18th centuries.

=== Town hall ===
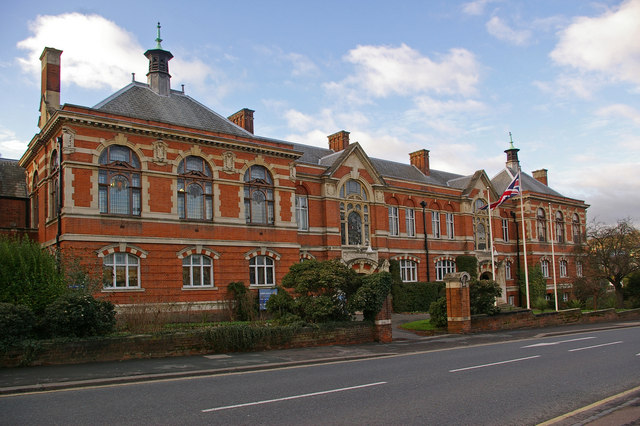
Town Hall, Castlefield Road

The current town hall was completed in 1901 to replace the old town hall in the High Street. It was designed by Macintosh and Newman in the Arts and Crafts style and was originally known as the Municipal Buildings. On opening, it also housed the police station and courts, but the police moved to new premises in Reigate Road in 1943 and the courts service vacated the building in the early 1970s. The town hall has been the headquarters of Reigate and Banstead Borough Council, since its inception on 1 April 1974.

=== Old Town Hall ===
The old town hall, at the east end of the High Street, was constructed in around 1728. It was built on the site of a chapel, dedicated to St Thomas Becket that was existence before 1330. Following the Reformation, the chapel became a market house. It was demolished in around 1785 and was replaced by the current red brick structure. The building served as the headquarters of Reigate Municipal Borough Council from its formation in 1863 until the borough council moved to the new town hall in Castlefield Road in 1901. Randal Vogan purchased the old town hall in 1922 and presented it to the borough council. (Note: Randal Vogan's generosity to Reigate is commemorated in two local street names: Randal Crescent and Vogan Close.)

=== Reigate Fort ===
Reigate Fort, on Reigate Hill, is one of 13 London Defence Positions, built in the 1890s. They were primarily designed as infantry redoubts, to be used in the event of an invasion by the French. The Reigate Fort was completed in 1898 and is one of the largest in the 72 mi (116 km) defensive line. It was defended by an earth rampart and had a clear view south over Reigate. Among the surviving buildings is a magazine, which would have been used for storing ammunition. Reigate Fort was declared redundant in 1907 and the land was sold. During the First World War, it was used as an ammunition store and is thought to have been used as a communications station for the British Army South East Command in the Second World War. The fort was restored in the early 2000s and is open to the public.

=== Reigate Hill Footbridge ===
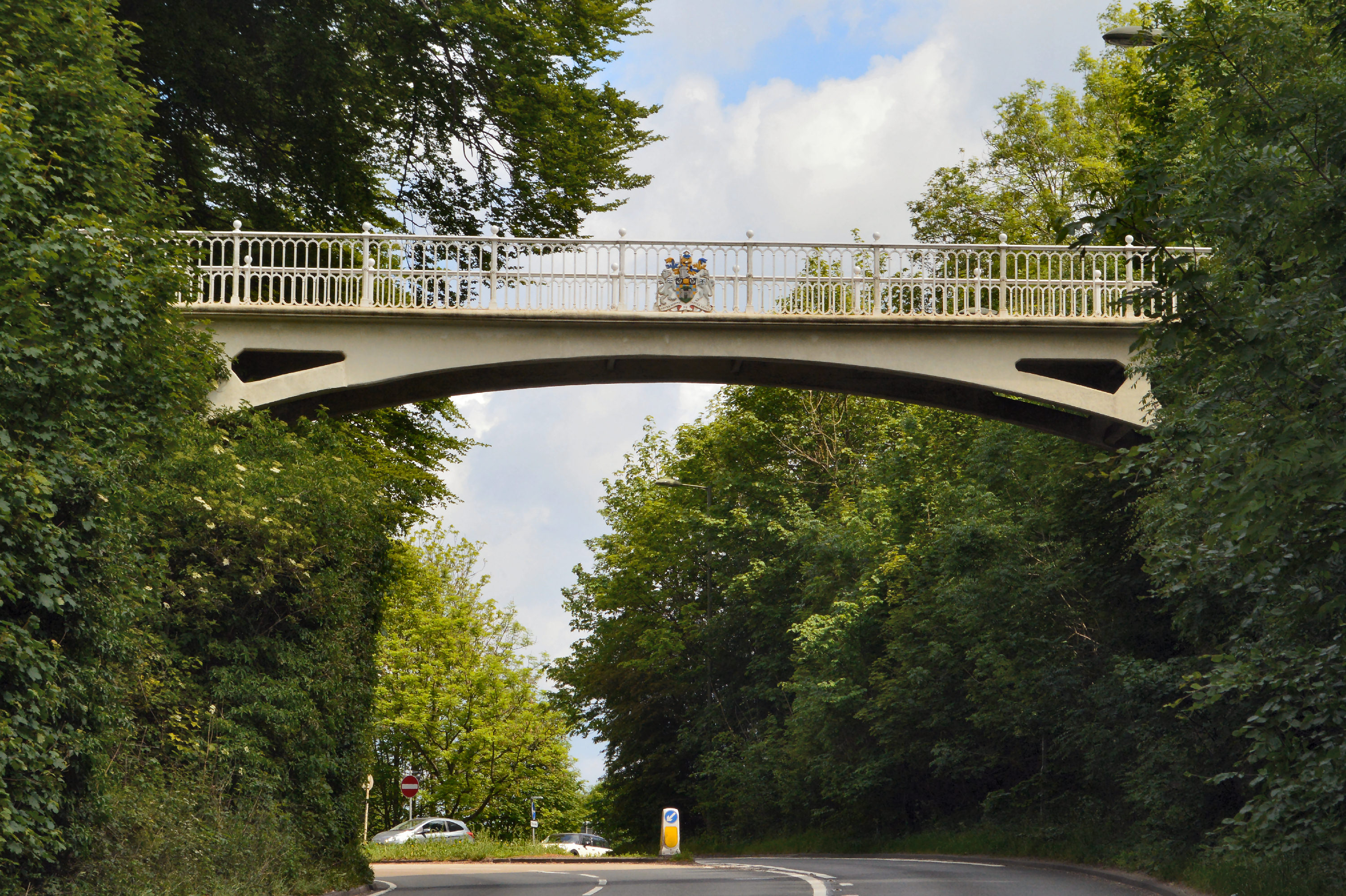
Reigate Hill footbridge

Reigate Hill Footbridge carries the North Downs Way over the A217 to the north of the town. It was completed in 1910 and has a span of 97 ft (30 m). It was built using the Hennebique method of construction and is one of the earliest reinforced concrete bridges in England. It replaced an earlier chain suspension bridge, which was built in 1825.

=== Wray Common Windmill ===
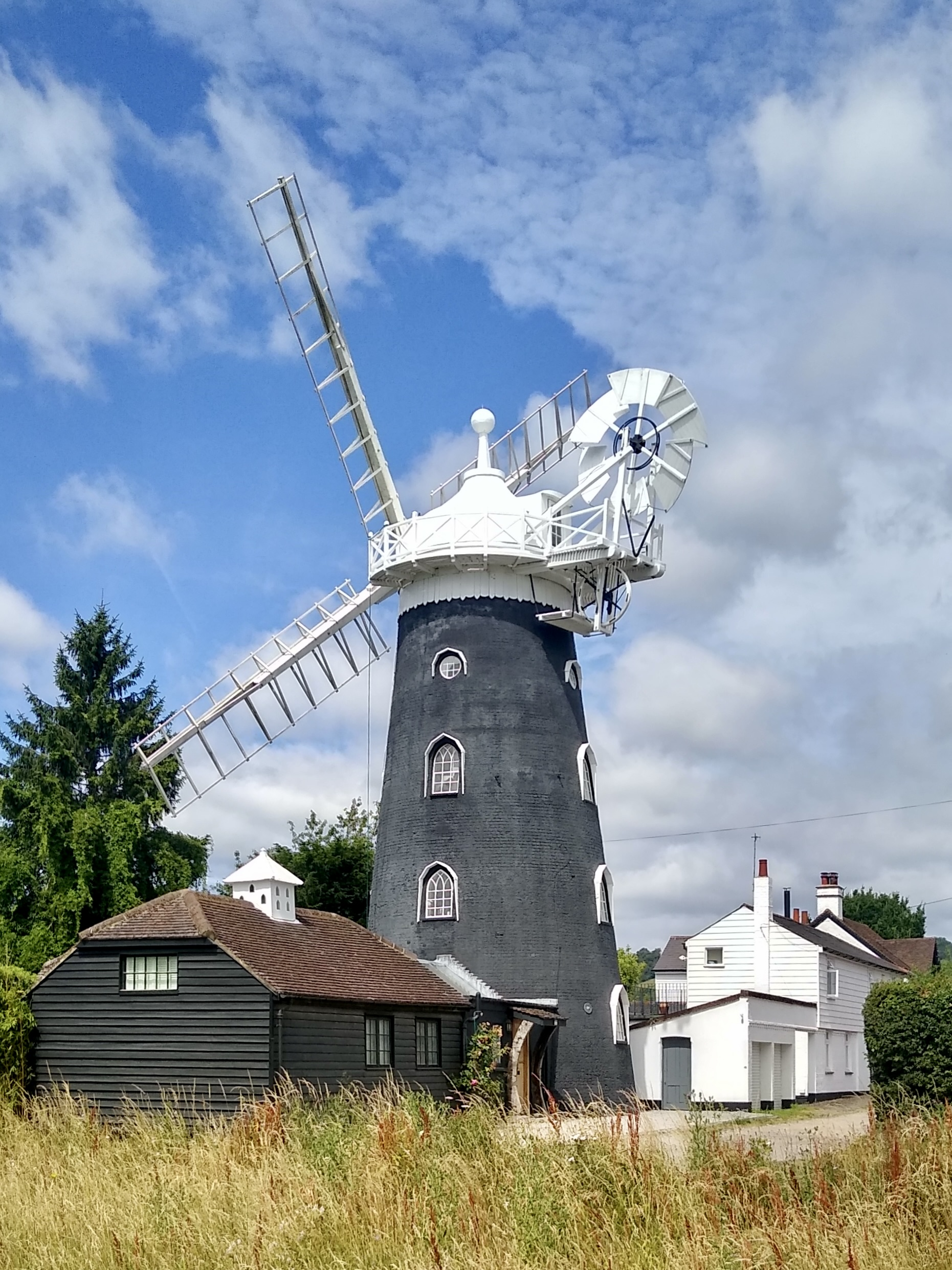
Wray Common Windmill

The windmill was built in 1824 and is to the north-east of the town centre. It is a tower mill, constructed of tarred bricks with a metal cap. The mill was used to grind corn until 1895, when it became an agricultural store. It was converted into a four-storey private residence in the 1960s. The building underwent a programme of restoration between 2004 and 2007, which included the installation of new, non-functioning sails.

== Parks and open spaces ==
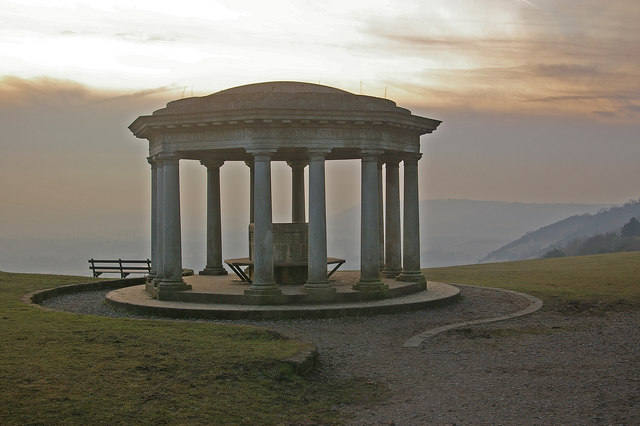
The Inglis Memorial, Colley Hill

Castle Gardens were laid out in the 1870s and cover an area of about 5 acres (2.0 ha). They were leased to the borough council by Lord Somers in 1873, but the freehold was not acquired by the council until 1921. A stone pyramid on top of the motte acts as a sally port to the Barons' Cave below.

Colley Hill, which lies to the north-west of the town, is part of the North Downs escarpment. 2.5 acres (1.0 ha) were donated to the borough council in 1910 and the remainder was purchased by the National Trust in 1913. The Inglis Memorial, originally a drinking fountain for horses, was given to the Borough of Reigate by Robert Inglis in 1909. The ceiling of the memorial is decorated with an ornate blue and gold mosaic.

Lower Gatton Park, around 1.9 mi (3 km) north of Reigate, is a 580-acre (234 ha) area of parkland on the south-facing lower slopes of the North Downs. It has its origins as a medieval deer park, which was created from the demesne lands of the manor of Gatton. It was landscaped by Capability Brown in the 1760s and 1770s, and includes an 27-acre (11 ha) ornamental lake. The park is open to the public on the first Sunday of each month from February to October.

The southern part of Priory Park was purchased by Randal Vogan in 1920, who donated the land to the borough council "to be preserved in its natural beauty for the use and quiet enjoyment of the public".|name=Vogan}} The remainder of the 140-acre (58 ha) priory grounds were acquired by the borough council in 1948. In 2007, the borough council began a restoration project, partly funded by a £4.2m lottery grant. The pavilion, designed by the architect, Dominique Perrault, was constructed as part of the project and houses a café. The park offers a children's play area, tennis courts and a skate park, as well as walking trails, formal gardens and a lake.

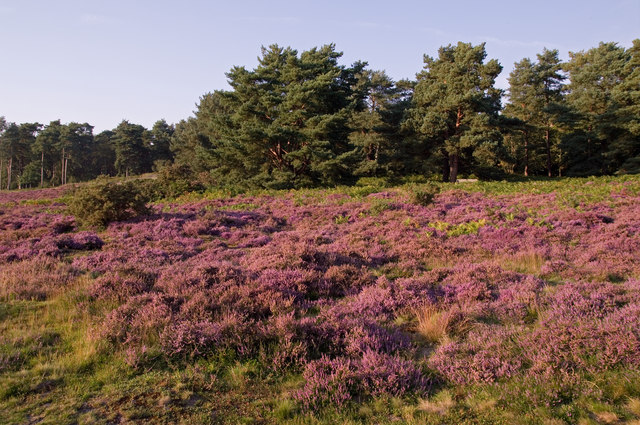
Heather on Reigate Heath

Reigate Heath is a 160-acre (65 ha) Site of Special Scientific Interest to the west of the town centre. The primary habitats are open heath and acid grassland, where the dominant species are common heather, bell heather and wavy hair-grass. Petty whin, soft trefoil and bird's-foot fenugreek are also found in these areas. The site also includes Alder woodland, home to species such as the common bluebell, marsh violet, marsh pennywort and the rare white sedge. At the eastern edge of the heath is an area of marshy meadow, a habitat not found elsewhere in Surrey, which supports meadowsweet, wild angelica, marsh marigolds and the southern marsh orchid.

South Park, to the west of Woodhatch, is a 10.5-acre (4.25 ha) recreation ground managed by the South Park Sports Association. Facilities include sports pitches and a children's playground. A new pump track for mountain bike and BMX riders, funded by two £20,000 grants, was opened in December 2021. The park has been protected by the Fields in Trust charity since October 1934.

== Culture ==
=== Art ===
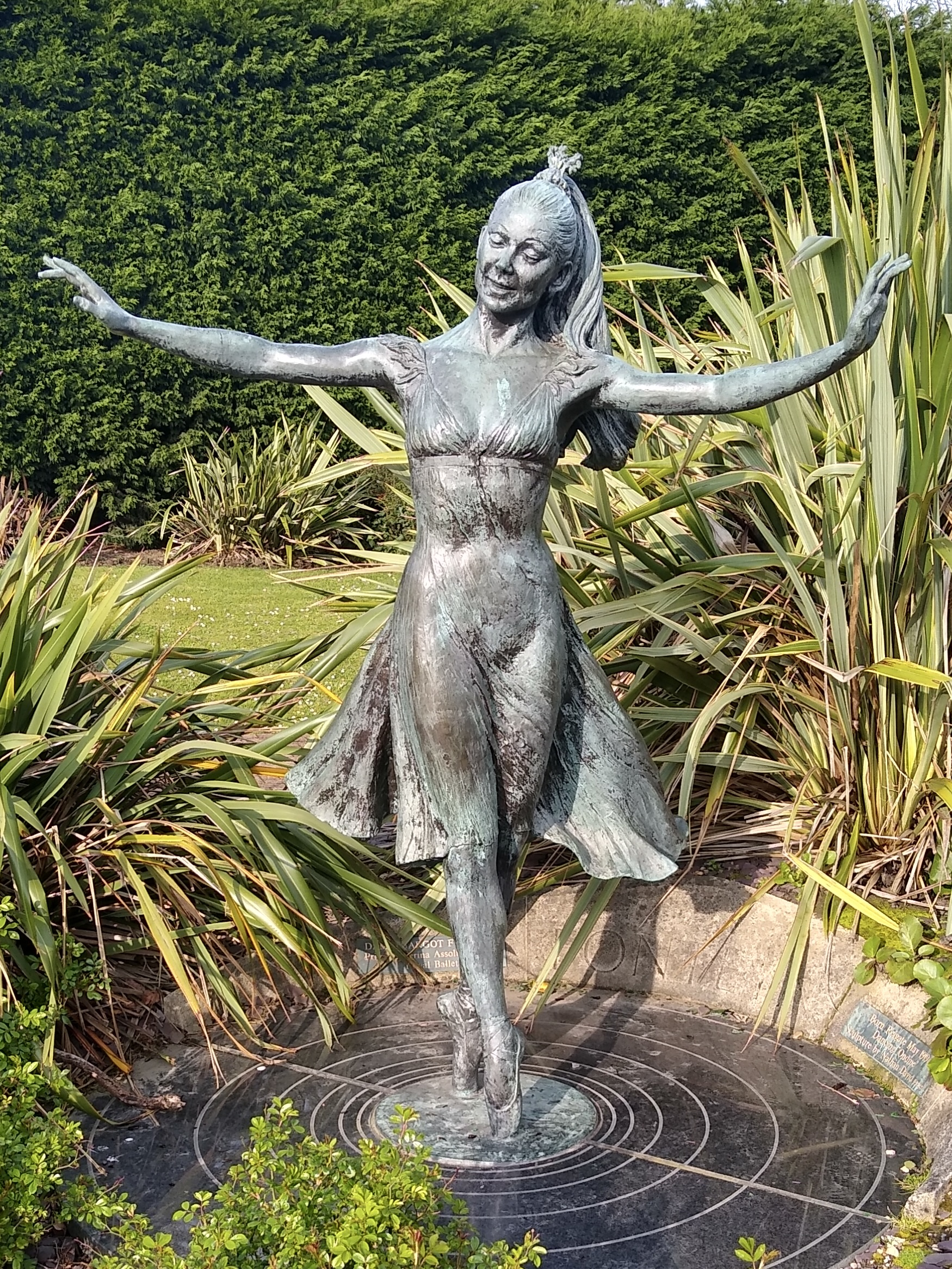
Statue of Margot Fonteyn

Reigate Priory Museum holds an early-16th century portrait of John Lymden, the final Prior of Reigate. The Town Hall holds several artworks, including paintings by Henry Tanworth Wells (1828-1903), George Leon Little (1862-1941) and George Hooper (1910-94).

Landscapes depicting scenes of the Reigate area by the artists Alfred Walter Williams (1823-1905), James Thomas Linnell (1826-1905) and Albert Ernest Bottomley (1873-1950) are held by Leicester Museum and Art Gallery, the Royal Pavilion and Museums Trust, Brighton, and Derby Museum and Art Gallery respectively.

Among the works of public art in the town is a statue of the ballet dancer, Margot Fonteyn, by the artist Nathan David, which was installed at the south end of London Road in 1980. (Note: The statue marks the site of the house, where she was born in 1919.)

=== In literature ===
Reigate is the setting for the Sherlock Holmes short story "The Adventure of the Reigate Squire", (also known as "The Adventure of the Reigate Squires" and "The Adventure of the Reigate Puzzle"). It is one of twelve stories featured in The Memoirs of Sherlock Holmes by Sir Arthur Conan Doyle.

== Sport ==
=== Football ===
Reigate Priory F.C. was founded in 1870, just seven years after The Football Association was created. It has played its home games at its ground in Park Lane for the entirety of its history.

South Park F.C. was founded in 1897 and has been a member of the Redhill & District Football League since its inception. The club initially played its home games in upper South Park, between Crescent Road and Church Road. In the late 1920s, it moved to its current premises in Whitehall Lane.

=== Cricket ===
Reigate Priory Cricket Club was founded in 1852, but it is believed that the sport has been played in the town since the 1770s. (Note: Thomas White, the batsman responsible for the so-called "wide bat controversy" at a 1771 match between Chertsey and the Hambledon Club, is thought to have lived in Reigate for much of his life.) The first recorded match at the club ground took place in 1853 between teams from East Surrey and West Sussex.

=== Golf ===
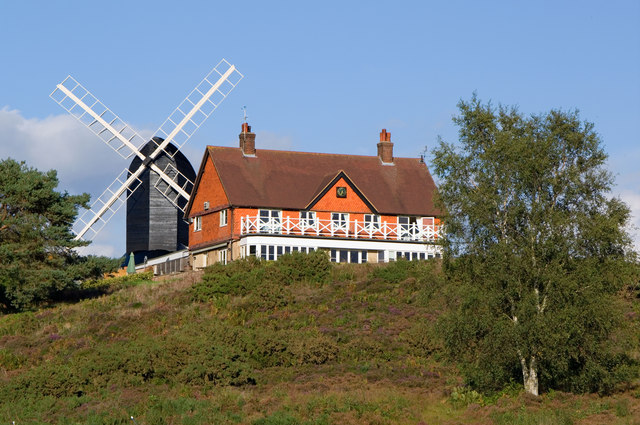
Reigate Heath Golf Course clubhouse and windmill church

Reigate Heath Golf Club was founded in 1895. Permission to create a nine-hole course on the heath was granted on the condition that male and female club members had equal rights. The course was formally opened on 20 February 1897; the clubhouse was completed shortly afterwards, but was extensively remodelled in 1969.

The 18-hole Reigate Hill Golf Club course was laid out as a par-72 course by the designer, David Williams. The club, at Gatton Bottom, was officially opened in November 1995 by professional golfers David Gilford and Andrew Murray.

=== Rugby union ===
Old Reigatian R.F.C. was founded in 1927. Initially the club played its home games at St Alban's Road but, after one year, it relocated to Home Farm, Merstham. It moved to its current ground on Park Lane in 1946 and the current clubhouse opened in 2012. As of 2022, the 1st XV plays in the London Two South West League.

=== Field hockey ===
Reigate Priory Hockey Club is part of the South East Hockey league structure.

== Notable people ==
- John Foxe (1516/17–87) – martyrologist, worked at Reigate Castle as tutor to the Earl of Surrey's children c. 1548–59
- John Parsons (1639–1717) – businessman and politician, Lord Mayor of London in 1703, lived at Reigate Priory from 1681 until his death
- Ann Alexander (1774/5–1861) – banker, lived for much of her life in Reigate
- George William Alexander (1802–90) – banker, philanthropist, son of Ann Alexander, lived at Woodhatch from 1853 until his death
- William Harrison Ainsworth (1805–82) – historical novelist, lived at Reigate for the latter part of his life
- George Luxford (1807–54) – botanist, lived in Reigate until 1834, published Flora of the Neighbourhood of Reigate in 1838
- Anne Manning (1807–79) – novelist, lived at Reigate Hill from 1850 to 1878
- James Cudworth (1817–99) – railway engineer, lived in Reigate from 1879 to 1899
- Francis Frith (1822–98) – photographer, founded his publishing company in Reigate in 1860
- Edward Frankland (1825–99) – organometallic chemist, set up his own independent laboratory on Reigate Hill in 1885
- Margaret Crosfield (1859–1952) – geologist, lived for the majority of her life in the town
- Edward Ayearst Reeves (1862–1945) – geographer, died in his Reigate home
- Howard Talbot (1865-1928) - composer and conductor, died at Reigate
- Fred Streeter (1879–1975) – horticulturalist and broadcaster, took his first job at Reigate Hill at the age of 12 and worked in the town until 1897
- H.M. Bateman (1887–1970) – cartoonist and illustrator, lived in Reigate for 14 years from 1918
- Margot Fonteyn (1919-91) - ballerina, born in Reigate
- Cliff Michelmore (1919–2016) – broadcaster, lived in Reigate for much of his working life
- Bob Doe (1920–2010) – Battle of Britain flying ace, born in Reigate
- Ray Alan (1930–2010) – ventriloquist and writer, lived in Reigate towards the end of his life
- Fatboy Slim (b. 1963) – musician and DJ, raised in Reigate and attended Reigate Grammar School
- Piers Morgan (b. 1965) – broadcaster, journalist and writer, born in Reigate
- Tom Chilton (b. 1985) – racing driver, born in Reigate
- Max Chilton (b. 1991) – racing driver, born in Reigate and attended Reigate St Mary's School
- Guy Lawrence (b. 1991) and Howard Lawrence (b. 1994) - the electronic music duo Disclosure; they grew up in the town and attended Reigate College
- Dylan Llewellyn (b. 1992) - actor born and currently lives in Reigate, notably starred in Derry Girls as James

== Twin towns ==
The borough is twinned with:

- Brunoy, Île-de-France, France
- Eschweiler, North Rhine-Westphalia, Germany.

== See also ==
- Geology of Surrey
- List of public art in Surrey
