= George William Alexander =

English philanthropist

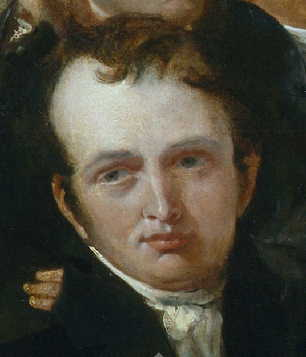
- from The Anti-Slavery Society Convention, 1840, by Benjamin Robert Haydon
- Born: 1802; London
- Died: 1890
- Occupation: financier
- Known for: Abolitionist
- Title: Treasurer of the British and Foreign Anti-Slavery Society.
- Spouses: Sarah Cleverly Horsnaill; Catherine Horsnaill
- Children: Three daughters and two sons
- Mother: Ann Alexander

George William Alexander (1802–1890) was an English financier and philanthropist. He was the founding treasurer of the British and Foreign Anti-Slavery Society in 1839. The American statesman Frederick Douglass said that he "has spent more than an American fortune in promoting the anti-slavery cause ..."

== Biography ==
Alexander was born in London. He was the eldest of nine children in an upwardly mobile Quaker family. When he was aged fourteen his father died, and Alexander had to work hard to continue his education and assist his mother, Ann Alexander, who had taken on the leadership of the bill-broking company, Alexander and Co. She ran the company and changed its name to A. M. Alexander. In 1823, when George became an adult, he became a partner in his mother's business and the name became A. and G. W. Alexander. He was still a minority shareholder and it was only in 1828 that he and his mother divided the profits equally. This continued until 1831 when his mother's share reduced as new partners were brought into the business.

The Society for the Abolition of the Slave Trade was principally a Quaker society founded in the eighteenth century by Thomas Clarkson. The slave trade had been abolished throughout the British Empire by the Slave Trade Act 1807. In August 1833 the British government passed the Slavery Abolition Act 1833, advocated by William Wilberforce, which abolished slavery in the British Empire from August 1834, when some 800,000 people in the British empire became free.

There nevertheless remained a need for a society that could continue to campaign for anti-slavery worldwide, and the British and Foreign Anti-Slavery Society was accordingly founded in 1839. One of its first significant deeds was to organise the World Anti-Slavery Convention in 1840:

"The Convention assembled in London at the Free-mason's Hall, on Friday, 12 June. Our expectations, we confess, were high, and the reality did not disappoint them." A very large and detailed picture of the proceedings was commissioned that today is in the National Portrait Gallery. This very large picture shows Alexander as treasurer of the new Society. The picture captures the meeting in 1840, but it was not complete until 1841. The new society's aim was "The universal extinction of slavery and the slave trade and the protection of the rights and interests of the enfranchised population in the British possessions and of all persons captured as slaves."

Alexander is to the far left of this painting of the 1840 Anti-Slavery Convention. Move your cursor to identify him or click the icon to enlarge

Alexander reported on his visits in 1839, with James Whitehorn, to Sweden and the Netherlands to discuss the conditions of slaves in the Dutch colonies and in Suriname. In Suriname, he reported, there were over 100,000 slaves with an annual attrition rate of twenty per cent. The convention prepared open letters of protest to the respective sovereigns.

Alexander lived in the Quaker community in Stoke Newington Church Street, in a very well regarded group of houses known as Paradise Row. Here he was visited in 1850 by Alphonse de Lamartine, and in 1853 by Harriet Beecher Stowe. His and the society's interests were no longer confined to the British empire and as treasurer he appears to have given freely of his own money. The American freed slave and later abolitionist and statesman, Frederick Douglass, wrote in 1855 after hearing Alexander give a speech in Britain, "George William Alexander ... has spent more than an American fortune in promoting the anti-slavery cause in different sections of the world." The Society's balance sheet in 1854 showed that Alexander was still treasurer and that income was £766 whilst expenditure was £856, with £321 "due to the treasurer".

He travelled on behalf of the society in an effort to encourage other countries to abolish slavery, visiting Spain, France, the Netherlands and Denmark. In 1846, Alexander attended another World convention in London. This time the subject was temperance.

His growing wealth enabled him to have his house rebuilt by 1870; the building later became known as Kennaway House.

Alexander's company is the longest surviving discount house in the UK and was still extant in 1995, as Alexanders Discount plc.

== Sources ==
- Letters on the Slave-Trade, Slavery and Emancipation, originally published in 1842, but republished in 1969. ISBN 0-8371-1730-5
- Sixty Years Against Slavery, published in 1900 by the Anti-Slavery Society, but credited to Alexander
- He is mentioned by name in Thackeray's novel Vanity Fair
