= Wray Common Mill, Reigate =

Windmill in Reigate, Surrey, England

Wray Common Mill
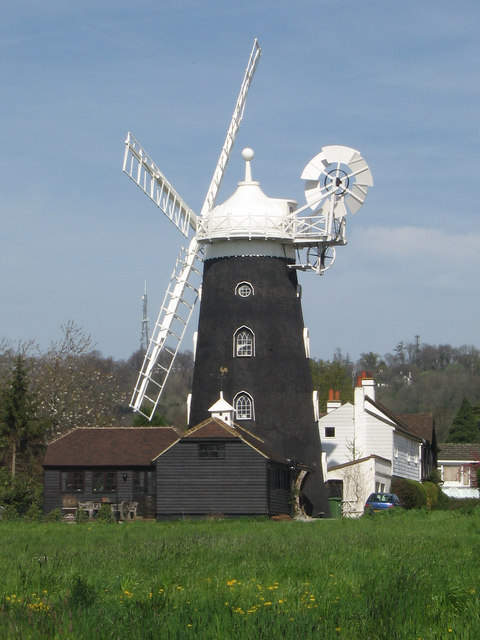
- The converted mill in 2008
- Interactive map of Wray Common Mill

Origin
- Mill name: Wray Common Mill
- Grid reference: TQ 2689 5109
- Coordinates: 51.245°N 0.183°W
- Operator: Private
- Year built: 1824

Information
- Purpose: Corn mill
- Type: Tower mill
- Storeys: Five storeys
- No. of sails: Four sails
- Type of sails: Double Patent sails
- Windshaft: Cast iron
- Winding: Fantail
- Fantail blades: Six blades
- Auxiliary power: Steam engine, later replaced by an oil engine

Wray Common Mill is a grade II* listed tower mill at Reigate, Surrey, England which has been converted to residential use.

== History ==
Wray Common Mill was built in 1824. The mill was worked by wind until 1895 when an accident resulted in a broken sail. The mill had a steam engine, later replaced by an oil engine, as auxiliary power. The shutters were removed from the sails c.1900. The condition of the sails rapidly deteriorated and a new set was fitted in 1928 by Thomas Hunt, the Soham millwright. At this time all machinery except the Windshaft and Brake Wheel was removed.

== Residential Use ==
Wray Common Mill was converted into residential accommodation in 1967. The mill fell into a state of disrepair in the late 1990s, and a new owner started restoration in 2004. It now features four bedrooms, a large kitchen, reception and a wine cellar. It was listed for sale in November 2008 for £995,000.

== Restoration ==
The cap was removed on 26 August 2004. A new cap was constructed, the building stripped to a bare shell and defects made good, the old tar was stripped, and a new coat applied to the exterior of the tower. The new cap was craned onto the mill in 2005. An application for Listed Building permission to replace the sails was made in 2006. The sails were fitted in December 2007, the restoration of the mill's external appearance to more closely match the mill in its working days was done in consultation of Bonwick Milling Heritage Consultancy. In a break with tradition, a modern method of producing laminated timber beams was used in making the sails. As a result of the work, the mill was removed from the Buildings at Risk Register in 2006.

== Description ==
Wray Common Mill is a five-storey brick tower mill with an ogee cap with a gallery. It has four double Patent sails carried on a cast iron windshaft. The cap is winded by a fantail. The cast iron Brake Wheel alone remains of the machinery, although it is known that the millstones were driven overdrift. The tower is 20 feet (6.10 m) diameter at the base and 12 feet (3.66 m) diameter at the curb, and 45 feet (13.72 m) high to the curb.

== Millers ==
- Joseph Coulstock 1824–1832
- Edward LArmer c.1850
- Robert Budgen 1855–1857
- Joseph Henry Cooke 1874
- Mrs M Cooke 1895
