= List of windmills in Surrey =

Extant (red) and former (blue) windmills in Surrey.
1 Buckland, 2 Capel, 3 Charlwood, 4 Ewhurst, 5 Frimley Green, 6 Outwood, 7 Reigate, 8 Tadworth, 9 Wray Common

A list of all windmills and windmill sites which lie in the current ceremonial county of Surrey.

== Locations ==
=== A, B ===
Location	Name of mill and grid reference	Type	Maps	First mention or built	Last mention or demise	Photograph
Alfold	Alfold Mill; Laker's Green Mill; Tickner's Heath Mill; Robbin's Mill; Dunsfold Mill; TQ 033 359	Smock	1871	1841	Probably built after 1813. Mill Field marked on 1841 Tithe map, first mention of a miller in 1845 Six Home Counties Directory. Working until c. 1870. Demolished c. 1913.	
Ash		Post		1332	The Abbot of Chertsey ordered a new windmill to be built at Ash in 1332.	
Banstead	Hundred Acres Mill; TQ 262 615	Post	1816	1505	Field names in the C16th indicate the possibility of an earlier mill. Demolished c. 1877.	
Belmont	The Folly Mill; TQ 253 622	Smock	1823	1823	Markeds as a folly on 1823 map. Windmill may have been erected post-1840. Demolished c. 1890 .	
Birtley	Birtley Mill; TQ 019 435			1834	Built to pump water into the Wey and Arun Canal. Demolished in 1853 .	
Blackheath	Tangley Way, Blackheath, near Guildford	Smock		After 1923	Designed by E Lancaster Burns for generating electricity. Out of use by the 1970s.	
Bletchingley	Cox Hill Mill				Moved to Ifield, Sussex c. 1870	
Buckland	Buckland Windmill; TQ 220 508		Smock		A saw mill, built in 1860s or 1870s. Restored 1995-2003.	

=== C ===
Location	Name of mill and grid reference	Type	Maps	First mention or built	Last mention or demise	Photograph
Capel	Clark's Green Mill; TQ 176 398	Post	1733; 1749; 1762; 1777; 1789	1649	Marked on a map of the manor of Dorking dated 1649. Demolished in 1774.	
Capel	Shiremark Mill; TQ 173 377	Smock		1774	Incorporated timbers from Clark's Green Mill. Working until c.1919. Burnt down 1970.	
Carshalton	TQ 269 630		1816	1816	Marked on the 1" to a mile Ordnance Survey map, 1816 .	
Caterham	TQ 329 554				Demolished before 1736.	
Caterham	Caterham Common Mill; TQ 325 563	Post		1696; 1762; 1793	Standing in 1795. Probably gone by 1838, possibly demolished c. 1851.	
Charlwood	Stanhill Mill; TQ 238 417				Blown down 13 January 1703.	
Charlwood	Little Park Farm Mill; TQ 243 398				Blown down 13 January 1703.	
Charlwood	Norwood Hill Mill; TQ 244 437		1729; 1750	1729	1750	
Charlwood	Charlwood Common Mill; TQ 245 409	Post	1762	1762	1762	
Charlwood	Charlwood Common Mill; TQ 245 409	Smock		1804	Burnt down February 1901. The base survived and was house converted in 1934.	
Charlwood	Lowfield Heath Mill; TQ 245 409	Post Mill		1989	Windmill World	
Chelsham	Chelsham Mill; TQ 350 577	Post	1762; 1770; 1823	1762	Burnt down c. 1840.	
Chiddingfold	SU 964 357		1762; 1789	1760	Stood 400 yards (370 m) north east of Chiddingfold Church.	
Chiddingfold	Hungry Corner Mill; SU 952 339	Post		1668	Demolished c.1813.	
Chiddingfold	Hungry Corner Mill; SU 952 339	Smock	1823; 1871	1813	Cap blown off c. 1874, demolished c. 1876. Base survives, used as a store.	
Chipstead	Mugswell Mill		1790	1772	1790	
Chipstead	Mugswell Mill; TQ 258 548	Post		1816	Working until c. 1895. Demolished c. 1912. Roundhouse survives.	
Cobham	Fairmile Mill; TQ 117 615		1816; 1823	c. 1805	Built c. 1805. Demolished in the 1850s.	
Cranleigh	Windmill Field; TQ 065 376				Gone by 1843.	
Cranleigh	Cranleigh Common Mill; TQ 048 395	Tower	1753	1703	Replaced by smock mill c. 1800.	
Cranleigh	Cranleigh Common Mill; Killick's Mill; TQ 036 403	Smock		c. 1800	Demolished in February 1917.	
Cranleigh	Cranley Mill; TQ 019 435			1833	A pumping windmill, supplied water for the Wey and Arun Canal. Demolished in 1853.	

=== D, E ===
Location	Name of mill and grid reference	Type	Maps	First mention or built	Last mention or demise	Photograph
Dorking	Popper Mill; Pupper Mill		1729; 1749	1729	1749	
Epsom Wells	early mill			15th century	15th century	
Epsom Wells		Post	1823; 1871	1796	Burnt down c. 1880	
Ewell		Tower	1816; 1853	1801	Demolished c. 1900	
Ewhurst	Hurt Wood Mill	Post	1733; 1749	1648	Standing in 1847, blown down c. 1854	
Ewhurst	Hurt Wood Mill; TQ 078 427	Tower	1871	1855	Windmill World	

=== F, G, H ===
Location	Name of mill and grid reference	Type	Maps	First mention or built	Last mention or demise	Photograph
Fetcham	Cheshire Mill	Tower	1789	1777	1804	
Frimley	early mill			1537	1537	
Frimley	Frimley Green Mill; SU 896 563	Tower	1816	1784	Windmill World	
Godstone	Tilburstow Hill Mill	Post	1762; 1777; 1790; 1871	1760	Collapsed 1805	
Godstone	Godstone Green Mill	Post	1816; 1871	c. 1810	Demolished late 1880s	
Haslemere	Grayswood Hill Mill; Oliver's Mill	Smock	1871	1785	Demolished August 1886	
Holmwood	Holmwood Mill		1762			
Holmwood	Holmwood Mill	Post	1816	1775	Demolished c. 1880	
Hookwood	Hookwood Mill	Post	1823; 1866	c. 1820	Demolished 1896	
Horley	Horley mill	Post	1762; 1777; 1789; 1816; 1871	1762	Demolished c. 1900	
Horne	Horne Mill		1823	1823	Standing in 1845, gone by 1851	
Horsell	Saw mill	Post mill		1890	c. 1910	

=== K, L ===
Location	Name of mill and grid reference	Type	Maps	First mention or built	Last mention or demise	Photograph
Kingston upon Thames	Kingston Mill		1700; 1733	1700	1733	
Leigh	Shellwood Common Mill		1729; 1750; 1762; 1789	1729	1789, later burnt down, gone by 1795	
Leigh	Shellwood Common Mill	Post	1816; 1823	1795	Standing in 1915, gone by 1925	
Limpsfield Chart		Post		1816	Demolished February 1925	
Long Ditton			1762	1762	1762	

=== M, N ===
Location	Name of mill and grid reference	Type	Maps	First mention or built	Last mention or demise	Photograph
Merstham		Post	1789; 1816; 1823; 1871	1786	Demolished 7 October 1896	
Mitcham	Mitcham Common Mill	Post		1806	Demolished 1906	
Mitcham		Horizontal				
Nutfield		Post mill		1296	1296	
Nutfield	Botterys Mill	Post		1680	Demolished December 1929	

=== O, R ===
Location	Name of mill and grid reference	Type	Maps	First mention or built	Last mention or demise	Photograph
Ockley	Emler Mill; Almer's Mill; TQ 147 395	Smock	1823	1803	Collapsed 23 November 1944; Windmill World	
Ockley	TQ 147 395	Smock			Replica for residential use. Windmill World	
Outwood	Outwood Mill; TQ 585 315	Post		1665	Windmill World	
Outwood	Outwood High Mill	Smock		1796	Collapsed 25 November 1960	
Reigate	Oatmill			1800	1800	
Reigate	Blackborough Mill		1700; 1729; 1733	1700	1733, replaced by later post mill on same site	
Reigate	Blackborough Mill, Blackberry Mill, Ganders Hatch Mill	Post		1736	Demolished 1938	
Reigate	Cockshot Hill Mill			1628	Collapsed by 1639	
Reigate	Cockshot Hill Mill	Post	1729	1729	Standing in 1826, gone by 1845	
Reigate	Cockshot Hill Mill	Post		1748	Demolished c. 1893	
Reigate	Reigate Heath Mill; TQ 235 500	Post	1753; 1762	1753	Windmill World	
Reigate	Trumpet's Hill Mill	Smock	1789; 1816; 1823; 1871	Built 1760s	Demolished 4 October 1950	
Reigate	Wray Common Mill; TQ 269 511	Tower		1824	Windmill World	

=== S ===
Location	Name of mill and grid reference	Type	Maps	First mention or built	Last mention or demise	Photograph
Shepperton	Upper Halliford			14th century	14th century	
Shepperton	Halliford			1382	1399	
Shepperton	Walton Bridge; Approximately; TQ 090 658			1597	1597	
South Beddington		Smock		1835	Burnt down 1852	
Sunbury on Thames				1311	1311	
Sunbury on Thames				1591	1603	
Sunbury on Thames	TQ 099 699			1683	Burnt down c. 1705	
Sunbury on Thames	TQ 099 699			1712	1722	
Sunbury on Thames	TQ 091 701	Smock		1819	Demolished 1900s	

=== T, W ===
Location	Name of mill and grid reference	Type	Maps	First mention or built	Last mention or demise	Photograph
Tadworth		Post		1295	1295	
Tadworth		Post		1600	1775	
Tadworth	New Mill; TQ 236 554	Post		1780	Windmill World	
Tadworth		Post		1795	Demolished 1890	
Walton-on-Thames			18th century or earlier			
Walton-on-Thames			1765	1765	1820	
Warlingham	Succombs Hill	Post		1198	1325	
Warlingham	Ashby's Mill	Smock		1865	Burnt down 24 April 1865	
Warlingham	Farleigh Mill					
West Horsley	Windmill Hill Mill	Tower	1729; 1753; 1762; 1777; 1790	1729	Demolished 1866	
Weybridge	Conduit Hill	Tower		1847	1847	
Windlesham		Post				

== Locations formerly in Surrey ==
- For windmills in Addington, Barnes, Battersea, Bermondsey, Brixton, Camberwell, Camerwell, Clapham, Coulsdon, Croydon, Dulwich, Kew, Lambeth, Newington, Norwood, Richmond, Rotherhithe, Shirley, Southwark, Streatham, Surbiton, Wandsworth and Wimbledon see List of windmills in Greater London.
- For windmills in Lowfield Heath see List of windmills in West Sussex.

== Notes ==
Unless otherwise indicated, the reference for all entries is:-

Farries, K G, and Mason, M T (1966). The Windmills of Surrey and Inner London. London: Charles Skilton Ltd.

Mills in bold are still standing, known building dates are indicated in bold. Text in italics denotes indicates that the information is not confirmed, but is likely to be the case stated.

== Maps ==
The maps quoted by date are:-

- 1594 – John Norden
- 1604 – Charles Whitewell
- 1610 - John Speed
- 1635 – Moses Glover
- 1658 - William Faithorne
- 1719 - Dr Harris
- 1729 – John Sennex
- 1733 – John Seller
- 1746 – John Rocque
- 1750 - Bowen
- 1753 – Emanuel Bowen
- 1762 – John Rocque
- 1777 – Andrews and Dury
- 1789 – Lindley and Crosley
- 1800 – Laurie and Whittle
- 1816- Ordnance Survey
- 1820 – Ordnance Survey
- 1823 - Bryant
- 1833 – Bryant and/or Greenwood
- 1850 – C Knight
- 1863 – Ordnance Survey
- 1871 - Ordnance Survey
