= Buckland =

Buckland may refer to:

== People ==
- Buckland (surname)

== Places ==
=== Australia ===
- Buckland, Queensland, a rural locality in the Central Highlands Region
- Buckland, Tasmania, a rural locality
- Buckland County, New South Wales
- Buckland River (Victoria)
- Buckland Military Training Area, Tasmania

=== Canada ===
- Rural Municipality of Buckland No. 491, Saskatchewan

=== United Kingdom ===
- Buckland, Buckinghamshire, a village and civil parish
- Buckland, Devon, two places: a village and a suburb of Newton Abbot
- Buckland, Gloucestershire, a village and civil parish
- Buckland, New Forest, Hampshire
- Buckland, Portsmouth, Hampshire, a residential area of the city of Portsmouth
- Buckland, Hertfordshire, a village and civil parish
- Buckland, Kent, a village
- Buckland, Oxfordshire, a village and civil parish
- Buckland, Surrey, a village and civil parish

=== United States ===
- Buckland, Alaska, a city
- Buckland River, Alaska
- Buckland, Massachusetts, a town
- Buckland, Ohio, a village
- Buckland, Virginia, an unincorporated community

=== Elsewhere ===
- Monte Buckland, a mountain in the Chilean part of Tierra del Fuego
- Buckland, New Zealand, a village (also two other places)
- Buckland Hill, Wales

== Arts and entertainment ==
- Buckland (Middle-earth), fictional place in The Lord of the Rings
- Buckland's Auction House, fictional workplace of Prue Halliwell in the television series Charmed

== Other uses ==
- Buckland, Braunton, North Devon, England, a historic estate
- Buckland (Buckland, North Carolina), a historic plantation house
- Buckland Station, a stagecoach station and hotel near Stagecoach, Nevada
- Buckland railway station, a former station on the North Island Main Trunk in New Zealand
- Baron Buckland, an extinct title held only by Seymour Berry, 1st Baron Buckland (1877–1928)
- Buckland Foundation, a charity endowed through the estate of Francis Trevelyan Buckland

== See also ==
- Places in England:
  - Buckland Brewer, Devon
  - Buckland Common, Buckinghamshire
  - Buckland Dinham, Somerset
  - Buckland Filleigh, Devon
  - Buckland-in-the-Moor, Devon
  - Buckland Monachorum, Devon
  - Buckland Newton, Dorset
  - Buckland St Mary, Somerset
  - East Buckland, Devon
  - West Buckland, Devon
  - West Buckland, Somerset
- Buckland Beacon, Dartmoor, Devon
- Buckland Hospital, Kent
- Buckland House, Oxfordshire
- Buckland Abbey, Devon
- Buckland Priory, Somerset
- Buckland Windmill, Surrey
