= Grimsby Lifeboat Station =

Former lifeboat station in Lincolnshire, England

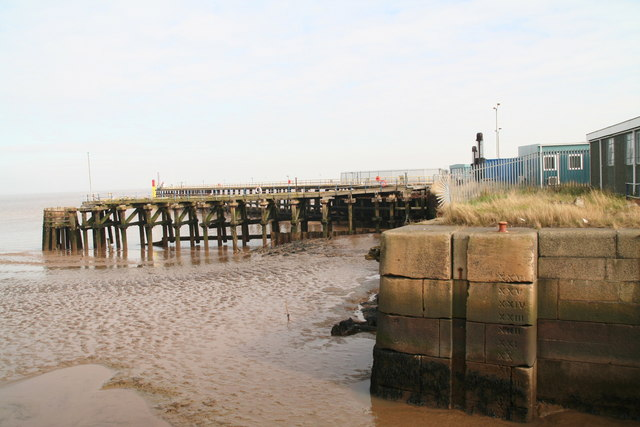
- Grimsby Fish Dock.

- Grimsby, Lincolnshire

General information
- Status: Closed
- Type: RNLI Lifeboat Station
- Location: Port of Grimsby, Grimsby, Lincolnshire, England
- Coordinates: 53°34′57.6″N 0°03′59.0″W
- Opened: 1882
- Closed: 1927

Grimsby Lifeboat Station was located at the Port of Grimsby, in the county of Lincolnshire, England.

A lifeboat was first stationed at Grimsby in 1882 by the Royal National Lifeboat Institution (RNLI) station.

With a motor lifeboat firmly established at Humber Lifeboat Station at Spurn Point, Grimsby lifeboat station was closed in 1927.

== History ==
Following difficulties in both maintaining a crew, and also with launching, the RNLI decided to close Cleethorpes Lifeboat Station and relocate to Grimsby, opening a new station there in January 1882. A boathouse and slipway were constructed on the seaward side of the Royal Dock.

The Cleethorpes lifeboat, a 33-foot (10 m) self-righting 'Pulling and Sailing' (P&S) lifeboat, one with both oars and sail, and built in 1868 by Woolfe and Sons, was transferred to the station. A gift of the Independent Order of Oddfellows Manchester Unity, she had been named Manchester Unity.

On the 7 October 1887, a new boat was provided to Grimsby, a 38-foot self-righting boat constructed by Forrestt of Limehouse, London, costing £624. She too was funded by the Independent Order of Oddfellows Manchester Unity, and was again named Manchester Unity (ON 123).

Tragedy struck when the boat was called out on the evening of 18 November 1893. Coxswain Charles Barr was thrown overboard by the violent seas before the boat had even left the harbour, and was killed when he was crushed between the lifeboat and the harbour wall. The boat was sent for repairs, but was so badly damaged that she was withdrawn from service.

A reserve boat, Reserve No.3 (ON 206) was placed on service temporarily, but was so well liked, it was made to be the permanent Grimsby lifeboat, and renamed Manchester Unity.

In 1898, a new Steam-class lifeboat, the James Stevens No.3 (ON 420), was sent to Grimsby for evaluation. She was over 56-feet long, had a top speed of 8½ knots, and cost £3,298. Initially a No.2 boat, she was able to cover a period from 1901 to 1903 as No.1, when Manchester Unity (ON 206) was loaned to Hull Trinity House for use at Spurn Point, whilst their regular boat was being repaired.

Manchester Unity was only back at Grimsby for a short time, before being replaced by the Charles Burton (ON 526) in 1904. A 38-foot non-self-righting Liverpool-class (P&S) lifeboat, the boat was built by Thames Ironworks, and named after her benefactor, the late Charles Burton. A new boathouse and roller slipway were constructed at the entrance to the No. 1 Fish Dock.

In 1911, the RNLI took over the management of the Humber Lifeboat Station from Hull Trinity House, and in 1919, the 40-foot Watson-class motor-powered lifeboat Samuel Oakes (ON 651) was placed on station. Ultimately, the requirement of a pulling and sailing lifeboat at Grimsby declined, and in 1927, Grimsby Lifeboat Station was closed.

In a 45-year period, the Grimsby lifeboat had been called 40 times, and saved 19 lives. Charles Burton (ON 526) went on to serve at Caister until 1941. A busy port location, the redundant boathouses were quickly demolished, and no evidence remains today.

In 2023, the Humber Lifeboat Station was forced to permanently abandon their base on Spurn Point due to a failing jetty, and further coastal erosion. The station was relocated to Grimsby Docks, where a temporary bad weather base already existed. The site of the current station within the docks is virtually in the same place as the 1904 boathouse. It remains to be seen if the station will one day be known as 'Grimsby Lifeboat Station'.

== Roll of honour ==
In memory of those lost whilst serving Grimsby lifeboat.

- Died when crushed between the lifeboat and the harbour wall during launch, 18 November 1893

Charles Risdale Barr, Coxswain (43)

- Died of exposure, following service to the Destroyer Violet, 23 February 1916

Robert (or Henry) Little, crew member

== Grimsby lifeboats ==
=== Grimsby No.1 station ===
| ON (Note: ON is the RNLI's Official Number of the boat.) | Name | Built | On station | Class | Comments |
|---|---|---|---|---|---|
| Pre-511 | Manchester Unity | 1868 | 1882−1887 | 33-foot Peake Self-righting (P&S) | (Note: 33-foot x 8-foot 6in (10-oared) Peake-class self-righting (P&S) lifeboat, gift of the Independent Order of Oddfellows Manchester Unity, built by Woolfe of Shadwell, London, costing £287 when new.); Previously at Cleethorpes. |
| 123 | Manchester Unity | 1887 | 1887−1893 | 38-foot Self-righting (P&S) | (Note: 38-foot x 9-foot (12-oared) self-righting (P&S) lifeboat, gift of the Independent Order of Oddfellows Manchester Unity, built by Forrestt of Limehouse, London, costing £624.); Badly damaged on 18 November 1893, and withdrawn from service. |
| 206 | Manchester Unity | 1890 | 1893−1901 | 38-foot 2in Self-righting (P&S) | (Note: 38-foot 2in x 9-foot (12-oared) self-righting (P&S) lifeboat, gift of the Independent Order of Oddfellows Manchester Unity, built by Livie of Dundee, costing £451 when new.); Previously Reserve No.3 at Harwich. Loaned to Humber in 1901. |
No.1 Station Closed 1901–1903
| 206 | Manchester Unity | 1890 | 1903−1904 | 38-foot 2in Self-righting (P&S) | |
| 526 | Charles Burton | 1904 | 1904−1927 | 38-foot Liverpool (P&S) | (Note: 38-foot x 10-foot 9in (14-oared) Liverpool-class non-self-righting (P&S) lifeboat, legacy of Mr C. T. H. Burton, built by Thames Ironworks of Blackwall, London, costing £1,044.) |

Pre ON numbers are unofficial numbers used by the Lifeboat Enthusiast Society to reference early lifeboats not included on the official RNLI list.

=== Grimsby No.2 station ===
| ON | Name | Built | On station | Class | Comments |
|---|---|---|---|---|---|
| 420 | James Stevens No.3 | 1898 | 1898−1903 | 56-foot 6in Steam | (Note: 56-foot 6in x 15-foot 9in Steam-class lifeboat, legacy of Mr J. Stevens of Birmingham, built by J. Samuel White of Cowes, costing £3,298.) |

== See also ==
- List of RNLI stations
- List of former RNLI stations
- Royal National Lifeboat Institution lifeboats
