= Killick's Mill (disambiguation) =

Killick's Mill is a Grade II* listed mill in Meopham, Kent, England.

Killick's Mill may also refer to:

- Killick's Mill, Cranleigh, a windmill in Surrey, England demolished 1917
- Killick's Mill, Strood, a windmill in Kent, England demolished by 1933
