= Humber Lifeboat Station =

RNLI lifeboat station in North East Lincolnshire, England

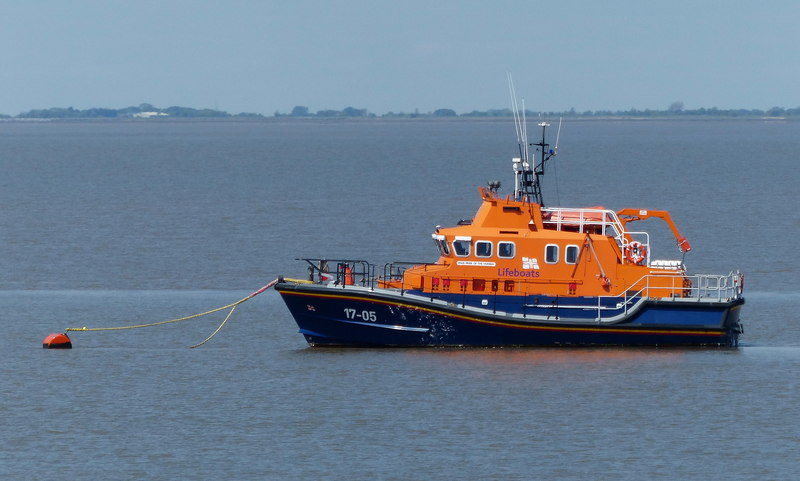
- Humber Lifeboat

- Location within Lincolnshire
- Former names: Spurn Point Lifeboat Station

General information
- Type: RNLI lifeboat station
- Location: Port of Grimsby, Wharncliffe Road N,, Grimsby, North East Lincolnshire, DN31 3QF, England
- Coordinates: 53°34′57.6″N 0°03′59.2″W
- Opened: 1810 / RNLI 1911
- Owner: Royal National Lifeboat Institution

Website
- Humber RNLI Lifeboat Station

Humber Lifeboat Station is located at Wharncliffe Rd North, within the Port of Grimsby, on the south shore of the Humber estuary, in North East Lincolnshire.

The station was opened in 1810, operated by Hull Trinity House, and was located on Spurn Point, now a tidal island, on the north side of the Humber estuary, attached to the south-east point of the East Riding of Yorkshire, by a three-mile (4.8 km) long narrow gradually moving Isthmus. Management of the station was transferred to the Royal National Lifeboat Institution (RNLI) in 1911.

The station currently operates a Severn-class All-weather lifeboat, 17-05 Pride of the Humber (ON 1216), which has been on station since 1997.

== History ==
A lifeboat station was established in 1810 at Spurn Point with a crew supplied by Hull Trinity House. Known as Spurn Point Lifeboat Station, a decommissioned gun battery emplacement, last used in 1809, was requisitioned as the main lifeboat building and was also partly converted into the Life Boat House Hotel. The crew of the lifeboat were billeted in Kilnsea, 3 miles (5 km) up the coast, until 1819 when cottages were built adjacent to the life boat house. The Life Boat House Hotel was owned and operated by the master of the crew. Apart from selling drink and provisions, the master made a side income from loading gravel and sand onto passing ships. The land and money to fund the operation had been supplied by the local lord of the manor. He petitioned Trinity House to take up the offer of the land and supply a lifeboat to use at Spurn. This they did, engaging Henry Greathead of South Shields in building a ship with ten oars.

In the early days of the rescue boat, the mood of the crew at Spurn was sullen as they were not paid too well and were at the mercy of the master who ran the inn to provide what food and drink they needed. Locals from up the coast would come to load ships with gravel and sand, which they did brandishing revolvers, threatening the crew members, who viewed the enterprise as taking away their self-sufficiency. In 1811, the master wrote to Trinity House to complain about this "Law of the Dunes" as he labelled it, to which they had no legal recourse, with the nearest officials miles away.

In December 1823, a fierce storm worked the ropes loose on the lifeboat and it capsized. It was ruined and needed replacing. Something similar occurred 60 years later in 1883, again after a particularly stormy night, the crew discovered that their lifeboat had been loosed of its moorings during the storm. This time it was safe and was later found drifting off the island of Texel, off the coast of the Netherlands.

Between 1908 and 1911, the station came under the aegis of the Humber Conservancy Board, who argued that the lifeboat station and crew should be handed over to the RNLI. For their part, the RNLI were reluctant to take on the crew as they were paid, which went against its policy of having volunteers. Eventually, these issues were sorted out and the RNLI assumed control in 1911. In 1919, the first motorised boat, the Samuel Oakes (ON 651) arrived on station, and in 1924, the station name was changed from Spurn Point to Humber Lifeboat Station.

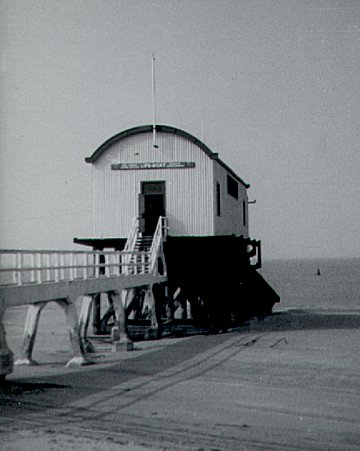
Spurn Lifeboat Station, before the lifeboats were moored afloat at the end of a jetty

The lifeboatmen were known to have taken advantage of the military railway between Spurn Point and Kilnsea as a means of quick transport up the coast to the village. They adapted a boat powered by wind to run along the line. When they met a military supply train travelling in the opposite direction, they were required to remove their sail wagon from the rails to allow the train to pass, not an easy task as the sail wagon had no working brake.

Due to the remoteness of the station, its restricted access (by road from the north) and the dangerous waters around this part of the east coast, the crew were on-site full time and were the only full-time paid RNLI All-weather lifeboat crew in the United Kingdom.

The station was one of nine RNLI lifeboat stations situated along the Yorkshire Coast and the most southerly of them all. Up until 2012, the families of the crew lived in cottages on Spurn Head adjacent to the lifeboat station, but a decision was taken to have two crews revolving through a roster and so the families moved to new accommodation in Kilnsea. As the spit of land is prone to breaches, this was also viewed as in the best interests of the families of the crew members. Latterly, the families had been housed in cottages built in 1975 to replace the row of houses first built in 1819. These were demolished when the seven new houses were built at a cost of £100,000. The retaining wall built to hold the sea back from the domestic area still survives fulfilling its intended purpose. From August 2012 to 2023, the two crews rotated through a shift of six days on and six days off.

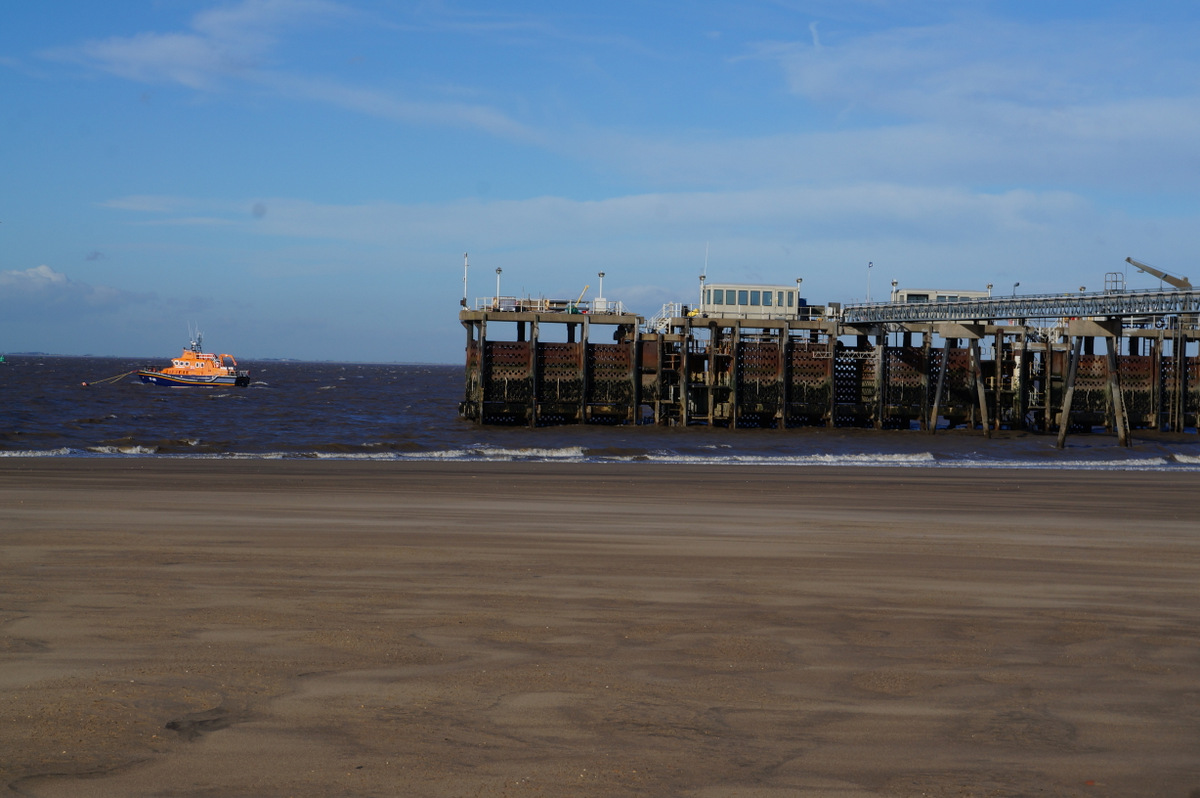
Humber Lifeboat at Spurn Jetty

The lifeboat was moored at the end of a pier that sets out into the Humber Estuary (westwards from Spurn Head) rather than a traditional launch down a ramp into the sea (which is on the eastern side of Spurn Head). This location has been described as being in the lee of bad weather, thereby providing a safer place to set off from. The crew have pushbikes to cycle down to the end of the pier and then use a boarding boat to get to the lifeboat. Despite some buildings being erected to launch the lifeboat, even from the early days, it was recognised of the difficulties in launching the boat from land, so it has been traditionally moored away from the coastline. A traditional lifeboat house with slipway was built in 1923 and used up until 1977, but it fell into disuse with bigger lifeboats arriving, that were better moored afloat. The slipway and lifeboat house were demolished in 1995.

The Humber Lifeboat has an operational area that covers the Humber estuary to Immingham Dock, south along the coastline to Skegness, northwards to Bridlington and up to a 100 miles (160 km) out to sea. This overlapped with the Cleethorpes Lifeboat to the south and the Withernsea Lifeboat to the north and to other rescue agencies along the river. The Bridlington and Skegness lifeboats were the next nearest all-weather lifeboats along the east coast.

In February 2023, issues were found following a routine inspection of the infrastructure of the station. On the grounds of the cost and health & safety reasons, and with consideration of the continuing coastal erosion and difficulties with access, the decision was taken to permanently relocate the boat and crew from Spurn Point to Grimsby, on the south side of the Humber estuary, where there was a second base for the lifeboat at Grimsby Docks, previously used temporarily in certain weather conditions. Operations were transferred in June 2023.

On 31 May 2025, the RNLI finally closed the chapter of their presence at Spurn Point, handing over the remaining station buildings to the Yorkshire Wildlife Trust.

Now with no access difficulties, and in line with all other All-weather lifeboat stations, Humber Lifeboat Station will gradually revert to a primarily volunteer crew.

First broadcast on 25 January 2026, the work of Humber lifeboat Station and crew was featured, when they hosted Guy Martin as a trainee crew member, for the TV programme Guy Martin:Proper Jobs.

== Notable rescues ==
A map showing the locations of both RNLI and independent lifeboat stations in Yorkshire

During the stations 200 year plus history, 33 RNLI gallantry medals have been awarded to the crews for their gallantry, including three gold, 13 silver and 17 bronze. Of these, Robert Cross, Coxswain for 31 years until 1943, won two gold, three silver and two bronze, as well as the George Medal.

In just 7 weeks between December 1978 and February 1979, the Humber Lifeboat launched to three medal rescues. Coxswain Brian William Bevan MBE, is the only crew member in the history of the RNLI to be presented with Bronze, Silver and Gold Medals for Gallantry at the same awards ceremony.

Exact records of the first 100 years of rescues are patchy, but between 1810 and 1854, over 800 people had been rescued from the seas around Spurn Head. Between 1911 (when the Humber Lifeboat came under RNLI control) and December 2009, the lifeboat was launched 2,268 times saving over 790 lives in the process.

- 31 October 1850 - the brig Cumberland was wrecked off the east coast at Kilnsea during a gale. The captain of the Cumberland had already been drowned by the time the Spurn lifeboat arrived and the crew of eight were forced to climb into the rigging to survive. Four were rescued, but the next day the rescue of the other four necessitated the use of rocket lines. One of the Spurn Lifeboatmen, John Branton, was lost at sea.
- 19 November 1855 - the lifeboat capsized whilst assisting the schooner Zabuia Deverell; two of the crew drowned.
- 14 February 1979 - the coaster Revi, a Panamanian registered vessel carrying silver sand, sent out a distress call when she was 30 nautical miles (56 km; 35 mi) off Spurn Point. The ship was foundering in a force ten gale and due to the huge waves at sea, (between 33 feet (10 m) and 39 feet (12 m) high) swamping the ship, she was taking on water. The crew of the City of Bradford IV put to sea at 00:15, and after several attempts in extremely rough seas, all four crew jumped from the foundering ship onto the lifeboat, with the last person to jump being the master, who was clinging to the side of the ship as she listing 45 degrees to port. The lifeboat headed back to the safety of the Humber Estuary at 02:33.
- 17 September 1989 - the crew responded to a distress call after a merchant vessel, the Fiona, stated she had been in a collision with another ship some 10 nautical miles (19 km; 12 mi) east of Spurn Point. The lifeboat Kenneth Thelwall was launched at 05:00, and when she was 5 nautical miles (9.3 km; 5.8 mi) out from the site of the Fiona, they could see the fire on the other ship involved, the Phillips Oklahoma. 16 of the 25 crew were taken off the now heavily unstable Phillips Oklahoma onto the Humber lifeboat. The coxswain of the lifeboat, Brain Bevan, later described the fire as "The worst I have ever seen at sea."
- 14 August 1990 - Two Royal Air Force Tornado GR.1 aircraft (ZA464 and ZA545) collided 10 nautical miles (19 km; 12 mi) north-east of Spurn Point. The aircrew of one aircraft from RAF Laarbruch (ZA464) ejected, but only the pilot was recovered alive. The aircrew of the other aircraft were deemed to have died, after a search by the Humber lifeboat and other agencies resulted in no-one being found.

== Station honours ==
The following are awards made at Spurn / Humber:ref name="Humber RNLI"/>

- George Medal

Robert Cross, Coxswain – 1940

- RNLI Gold Medal

Robert Cross, Coxswain – 1940

Robert Cross GM, Coxswain – 1943 (Second-Service clasp)

Brian Bevan, Superintendent Coxswain – 1979

- RNIPLS Silver Medal

James Norris, Master of the Smack Waterloo – 1839

J. M. Williams, Mate of the quarantine Cutter Bee – 1843

- RNLI Silver Medal

Edward Weldrake – 1877

Robert Cross, Coxswain – 1916

Robert Cross, Coxswain – 1925 (Second-Service clasp)

Robert Cross, Coxswain – 1939 (Third-Service clasp)

John Sanderson Major, crew member – 1940
William Jenkinson, crew member – 1940
William James Jenkin Hood, crew member – 1940
Samuel Cross, crew member – 1940
Samuel Frederick Hoopell, crew member – 1940

George Richards, Reserve Mechanic – 1943

Brian Bevan, Superintendent Coxswain – 1979

- RNLI Bronze Medal

Robert Cross, Coxswain – 1922

John Sanderson Major, Motor Mechanic – 1939

Robert Cross GM, Coxswain – 1941 (Second-Service clasp)

George Stephenson, crew member – 1943
Samuel Cross, crew member – 1943
Sidney Harman, crew member – 1943
William Major, crew member – 1943
George Shakesby, crew member – 1943

Dennis Bailey, Second Coxswain – 1979
Barry Sayers, Mechanic – 1979
Ronald Sayers, Assistant Mechanic – 1979
Michael Barry Storey, crew member – 1979
Peter Jordan, crew member – 1979
Sydney Rollinson, crew member – 1979
Dennis Bailey (Jnr), crew member – 1979
Brian Bevan, Superintendent Coxswain – 1979

Brian Bevan, Superintendent Coxswain – 1982 (Second-Service clasp)

- The Thanks of the Institution inscribed on Vellum

R. Buchan, Coxswain – 1966

Humber Lifeboat Crew – 1979

Peter Jordan, crew member – 1980
Dennis Bailey Jnr, crew member – 1980

David Steenvoorden, Acting Coxswain Superintendent – 2004

David Steenvoorden, Superintendent Coxswain – 2006

- A Framed Letter of Thanks signed by the Chairman of the Institution

Dennis Bailey, Second Coxswain – 1987

David Steenvoorden, Superintendent Coxswain – 2005

Daniel Atkinson, Assistant Mechanic – 2006

- A Collective Letter of Thanks signed by the Chairman of the Institution

Brian Bevan, Superintendent Coxswain – 1987
Dennis Bailey, Second Coxswain – 1987
Richard White, Mechanic – 1987
Peter Thorpe, Assistant Mechanic – 1987
Jack Essex, crew member – 1987
David Cape, crew member – 1987

Brian Bevan, Superintendent Coxswain – 1994
Robert White, Second Coxswain – 1994
Peter Thorpe, Mechanic – 1994
Leslie Roberts, Assistant Mechanic – 1994
Sydney Rollinson, crew members – 1994
David Steenvoorden, crew members – 1994
Christopher Barnes, crew members – 1994

David Steenvoorden, Coxswain – 2012
Stephen Purvis, crew member – 2012

- Testimonial on Vellum awarded by the Royal Humane Society

C. Alcock, Second Mechanic – 1957

- A Special Doctor’s Certificate on Vellum

Dr James Duncan Busfield – 1976

- Member, Order of the British Empire (MBE)

Brian William Bevan, Superintendent Coxswain – 1999

David Leonardus Steenvoorden – 2017

== Roll of honour ==
In memory of those lost whilst serving Spurn Point / Humber lifeboat:

- Lost on service to the brig Cumberland on 31 October 1850

John Branton

- Suffered from exposure, and died on 13 April 1853

Capt. Michael Hansley Welburn, Coxswain

- Drowned when the lifeboat capsized, on service to the schooner Zabuia Deverell on 19 November 1855

J. Combes
H. Holmes

== Humber lifeboats ==
=== Pulling and Sailing (P&S) lifeboats ===
ON (Note: ON is the RNLI's Official Number of the boat.)	Name	Built	On station	Class	Comments
–	Unnamed	1810	1810–1823	Greathead-class	(Note: 10-oared lifeboat, built by Henry Greathead of South Shields, costing £200.)
–	Unnamed	1810	1824–1853	30-foot 2in North Country	(Note: 30-foot 2in x 10-foot (10-oared) North Country lifeboat, funded by Harbour Dues, built by Thomas Mason of Hull, costing £190.)
–	Unnamed	1853	1853–1883	30-foot Peake Self-righting (P&S)	(Note: 30-foot x 9-foot 3in (10-oared) Peake-class self-righting (P&S) lifeboat, funded by Hull Trinity House, built by Hallett of Hull, costing £113.)
–	Mew?	1881	1881–1901	32-foot 6in Non-self-righting	(Note: 32-foot 6in x 9-foot 8in (10-oared) non-self-righting (P&S) lifeboat, funded by Hull Trinity House, built by John E. Cooper of Hull, costing £195.)
206	Manchester Unity	1890	1901–1903	38-foot Self-righting (P&S)	(Note: 38-foot x 9-foot (12-oared) self-righting (P&S) lifeboat, built by Livie of Dundee, costing £451 when new.); Previously Reserve No.3 at Harwich, and Manchester Unity at Grimsby. Loaned to Spurn from Grimsby when Mew was withdrawn.
631	Unnamed	1903	1903–1913	34-foot 6in Non-self-righting	(Note: 34-foot 6in x 9-foot 10in (10-oared) non-self righting lifeboat, funded by the Humber Conservancy Commissioners, built by Earles SB & Eng Co. of Kingston upon Hull, costing £700 when new.)
516	Reserve No.9	1903	1913–1919	38-foot Liverpool (P&S)	(Note: 38-foot x 10-foot (10-oared) Liverpool-class (P&S) lifeboat, gift of Mrs S. C. Guthrie of Tunbridge Wells, built by Thames Ironworks of Blackwall, London, costing £1,054 when new.); Previously Charles Deere James at St Agnes (IOS).

=== Motor lifeboats ===
ON	Op. No. (Note: Op. No. is the RNLI's Operational Number of the boat carried on the hull.)	Name	Built	On Station	Class	Comments
651	–	Samuel Oakes	1918	1919–1923	40-foot Watson	
680	–	City of Bradford	1923	1923–1929	45-foot Watson	Paid for by a fundraising effort in the City of Bradford. (Note: The City of Bradford has paid for several lifeboats (stationed at Teesmouth and Ramsgate as well as at Spurn Head) after a ship carrying wool was wrecked off the Welsh coast in the 19th century with the loss of many lives. Bradford was a prime woollen and worsted town (later city).); Renamed City of Bradford I in 1928.
709	–	City of Bradford II	1929	1929–1954	45-foot 6in Watson	She was named at Bridlington to allow people to witness the event and reach the ceremony easily; it was decided that Spurn Point was too remote.
680	–	City of Bradford I	1923	1929–1932	45-foot Watson	Humber No.2
911	–	City of Bradford III	1954	1954–1977	46-foot 9in Watson	Transferred to Lytham St Annes in 1977
828	–	The Princess Royal (Civil Service No.7)	1939	1968–1969	46-foot Watson	Humber No.2
1052	54-07	City of Bradford IV	1976	1977–1987	Arun	Funded by the Lord Mayor of Bradford's Charity Appeal 1974–1975.
1123	52-37	Kenneth Thelwall	1987	1987–1997	Arun	Named after its benefactor, Kenneth Thelwall from the East Riding of Yorkshire. Transferred to Holyhead Lifeboat Station.
1216	17-05	Pride of the Humber	1996	1997–	Severn	

=== Inshore lifeboats ===
Op. No.	Name	On station	Class	Comments
D-56	Unnamed	1964	D-class (RFD PB16)	ILB trialled in 1964, but relocated to Humber Mouth Lifeboat Station at Humberston in 1965.

== See also ==
- List of RNLI stations
- List of former RNLI stations
- Royal National Lifeboat Institution lifeboats
