= Cleethorpes Lifeboat Station =

RNLI Lifeboat station in Lincolnshire, England

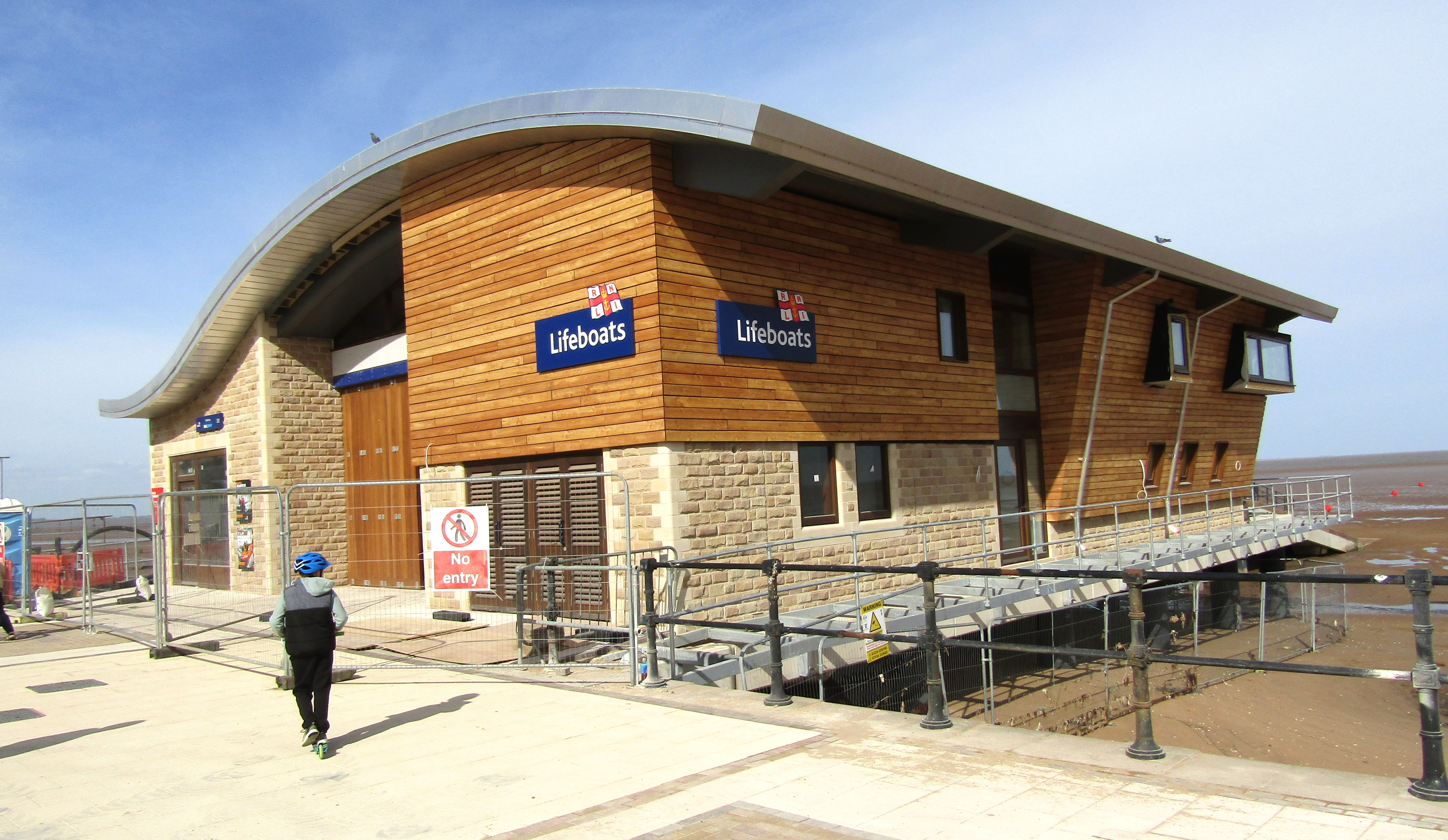
- Cleethorpes Lifeboat Station

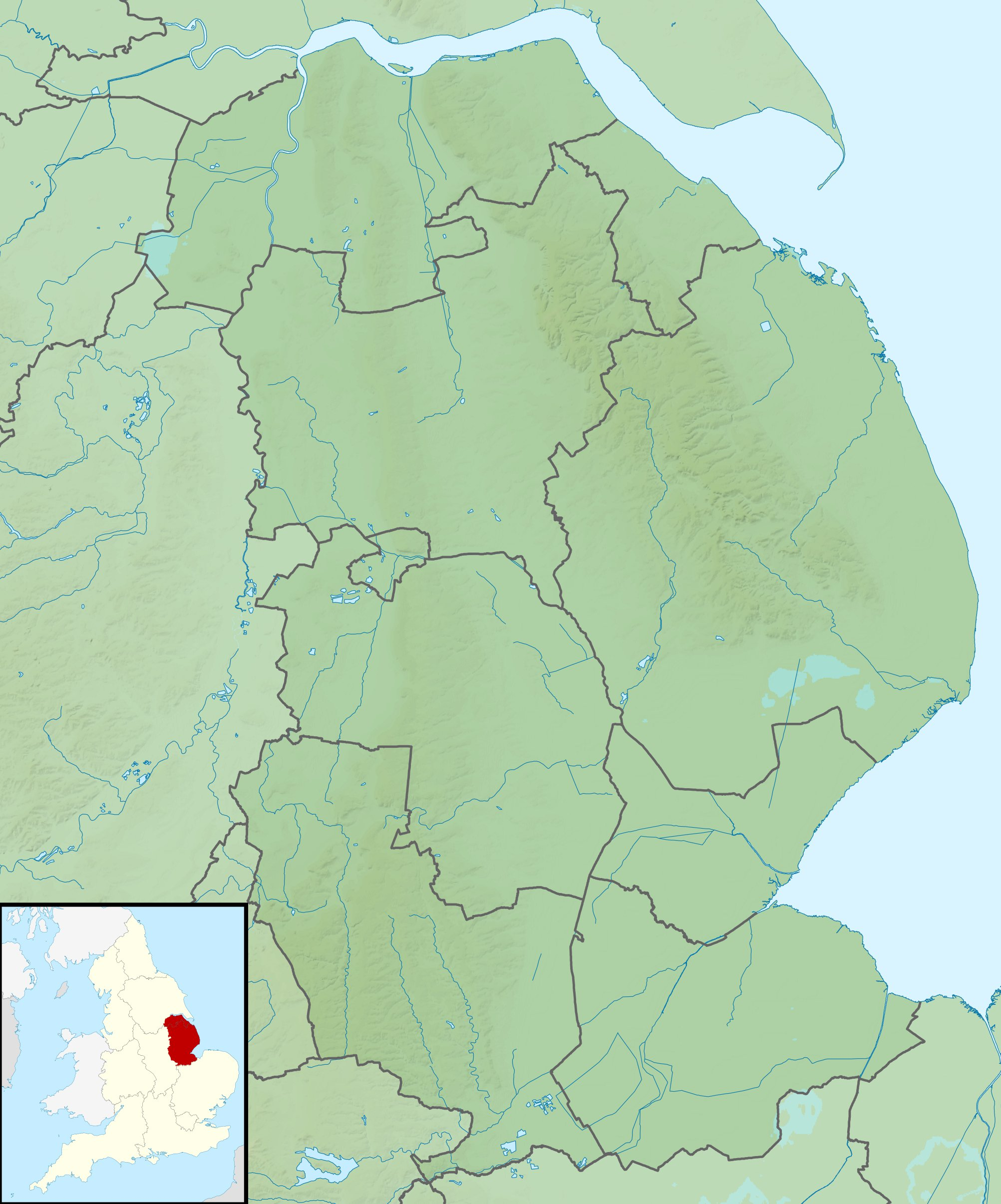
- Location within Lincolnshire
- Former names: Humber Mouth Lifeboat Station

General information
- Type: RNLI Lifeboat Station
- Location: The Promenade, Cleethorpes, Lincolnshire, DN35 8SE, England
- Coordinates: 53°33′25.2″N 0°01′23.8″W
- Opened: 1868–1882; 1987 (ILB)
- Owner: Royal National Lifeboat Institution

Website
- Cleethorpes RNLI Lifeboat Station

Cleethorpes Lifeboat Station is located on the Central Promenade, in the seaside town of Cleethorpes, which sits on the south bank of the River Humber estuary, in north east Lincolnshire.

A lifeboat was first stationed at Cleethorpes by the Royal National Lifeboat Institution (RNLI) in 1868, operating for just 14 years, before being relocated to Grimsby.

The present station was re-established in 1987, and currently operates a B-class (Atlantic 85) Inshore lifeboat, Loving You (B-942), on station since 2025, and the smaller D-class (IB1) Inshore lifeboat, James and Deanna Adams (D-889), on station since 2024.

== History ==
In 1868, the RNLI acceded to a request by local residents, that the Institution place a lifeboat at Cleethorpes. It was felt that a lifeboat was suited to Cleethorpes, as any ships running aground on the flat shore whilst trying to enter the River Humber, were usually out of reach of the rocket lines of the Rocket Brigade.

A boathouse was constructed, and a 33-foot lifeboat and carriage were provided, all funded by the Independent Order of Oddfellows Manchester Unity. Prior to its arrival, the lifeboat was exhibited at both The Crystal Palace and Windsor, before being transported to Grimsby, from where it was drawn on its carriage in a grand parade to Cleethorpes. It was reported that 70,000 attended the naming ceremony in August 1868, where the lifeboat, a 'Pulling and Sailing' (P&S) lifeboat, one with oars and sails, was duly named Manchester Unity. A demonstration of the self-righting abilities of the boat then took place.

In a severe gale of 15 November 1878, the brigantine Sea Flower of Seaham ran aground on the Hale Sand, near Donna Nook. The Donna Nook lifeboat was got ready, but before she could launch, the vessel got away again. The following day, distress signals were seen once again, but this time, the Cleethorpes lifeboat Manchester Unity was launched. Some injury and damage was sustained when the Ship's boat landed on the lifeboat, but all the crew were rescued and brought ashore.

The long flat shore, previously thought suitable for a lifeboat, was actually proving too difficult for launching, and with extra problems finding sufficient crew members, Cleethorpes lifeboat Station was closed in January 1882. The Manchester Unity was transferred to a new station established at Grimsby.

- Please see Grimsby Lifeboat Station for further information.

== 1960s onwards ==
In 1964, in response to an increasing amount of water-based leisure activity, the RNLI placed 25 small fast Inshore lifeboats around the country. These were easily launched with just a few people, ideal to respond quickly to local emergencies.

One of the stations provided with an Inshore lifeboat was Humber, across the estuary of the River Humber at Spurn Point. A D-class (RFD PB16) lifeboat (D-56) was placed on station in 1964, but the location was found to be unsuitable. On 1 August 1965, the lifeboat was transferred to the new Humber Mouth Lifeboat Station, located initially at the Humber Mouth Yacht Club at Humberston, and then at Humberston Holiday Camp from 1967. After 14 years operations, the D-class lifeboat was withdrawn in 1979, and Humber Mouth Lifeboat Station officially closed in March 1980.

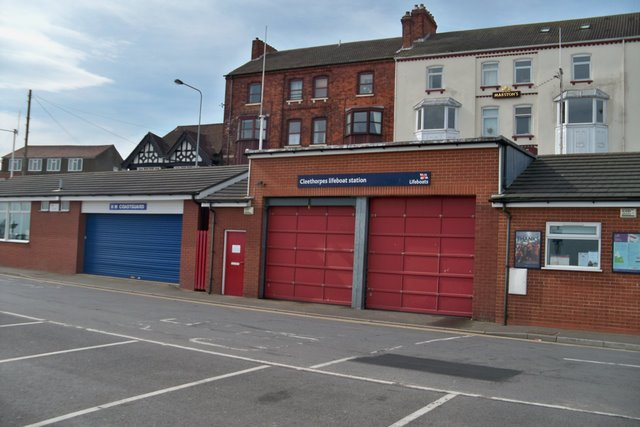
Former Cleethorpes Lifeboat House

An independent lifeboat service operated at Cleethorpes after the closure of the Humber Mouth Lifeboat Station, but an increasing number of calls prompted the reopening of an RNLI station. £45,000 was raised locally to re-establish the station, which opened on 29 June 1987, this time taking the original name of Cleethorpes Lifeboat Station.

On the 30 July 1989, the Inshore lifeboat was called to five canoeists, caught out in a sudden squall, with winds of force 7–8, on a charity paddle from Cleethorpes to Spurn Point and back, raising money for Barnardo's. After some searching in 10 ft (3.0 m) seas, the canoes were found, all five men picked up, and then with great difficulty, all transferred to the Pilot Boat Neptune. On the return, the lifeboat was alerted to the 20-foot yacht Serenus, aground near Spurn Point. A tow was set up, the boat re-floated, and the yacht and two occupants taken to Grimsby. In recognition of the courage, leadership, determination and fine seamanship, Helm David Steenvoorden, later to become Coxswain of the Humber lifeboat, was awarded the RNLI Bronze Medal. Crew members Steven Burton and Martin Kennedy were accorded 'The Thanks of the Institution inscribed on Vellum', and all three received 'The Ralph Glister Award 1989', for the most meritorious service of the year performed by a rescue boat crew.

Cleethorpes would become the sixth station to receive one of the Blue Peter lifeboats, which were funded by the appeals held on the BBC Television children's programme Blue Peter. Following the 'Pieces of Eight' appeal, Tricentrol II (D-325) was withdrawn on 22 February 1994, and replaced by Blue Peter VI (D-454). A naming ceremony was held on 16 July 1994, the lifeboat being handed over to Cleethorpes lifeboat station by Blue Peter presenter Anthea Turner, followed by a fly-past of the Air-Sea rescue helicopter from RAF Leconfield.

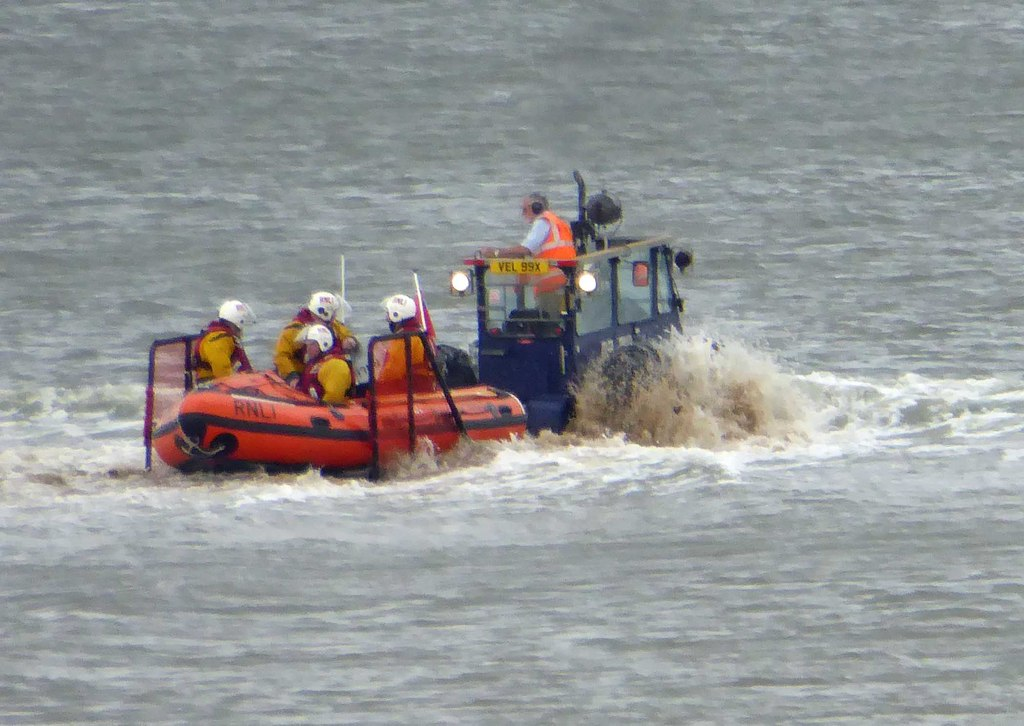
Launching Cleethorpes lifeboat James Burgess II (D-757) in 2015

In a joint rescue with both the Humber and Cleethorpes lifeboats on 26 February 2004, and with the two lifeboats from Skegness and Mablethorpe on standby, in heavy snow showers and gale-force-8 winds, two men and the fishing boat Dolland were saved. The vessel had been reported adrift off the coast at Cleethorpes. Setting out in the D-class (EA16) Blue Peter VI (D-454), Helm Gary Barlow had taken three crew aboard for stability. On arrival at the vessel, two crew went aboard the Dolland. The water was too shallow for the Humber Severn-class lifeboat to get close, and the D-class was too lightweight to make a tow, so with considerable skill and seamanship, a tow line was brought by the D-class to the vessel from the Severn-class, which could then tow the Dolland to safety. Helm Gary Barlow was awarded the RNLI Silver Medal, and the 'James Michael Bower Endowment Fund award' for this service, with crew members Shaun Sonley, Ian Sanderson and Tony Salters each awarded the RNLI Bronze Medal.

Construction of a new lifeboat station for Cleethorpes began in April 2022, with work being placed on hold in February 2023, after the collapse of the contractor Tolent. The station was finally completed in May 2025. A new B-class (Atlantic 85) is due on service in Autumn 2025, in addition to the D-class.

== Station honours ==
The following are awards made at Cleethorpes:

- RNLI Silver Medal
  Gary Barlow, Helm – 2004
- James Michael Bower Endowment Fund
  awarded by the Peninsular and Oriental Steam Navigation Company, to recipients of the RNLI Gold and Silver Medal
  Gary Barlow, Helm – 2004
- RNLI Bronze Medal
  David L. Steenvoorden, Helm – 1990
  Shaun Sonley, crew member – 2004
  Ian Sanderson, crew member – 2004
  Anthony Salters, crew member – 2004
- The Ralph Glister Award 1989
  (for the most meritorious service of the year performed by a rescue boat crew)
  David L. Steenvoorden, Helm – 1990
  Steven A. Burton, crew member – 1990
  Martin J. Kennedy, crew member – 1990
- The Thanks of the Institution inscribed on Vellum
  Steven A. Burton, crew member – 1990
  Martin J. Kennedy, crew member – 1990
- A Framed Letter of Thanks signed by the Chairman of the Institution
  Gary Barlow, crew member – 1996
  Shane Johnson, crew member – 1997
- A Collective Letter of Thanks signed by the Chairman of the Institution
  David L. Steenvoorden, Helm – 1990
  N. Holroyd, Tractor Driver – 1990
  T. Smith, Launcher – 1990
  D. W. Richardson, crew member – 1990
  M. A. Sweeney, crew member – 1990
  M. J. Kennedy, crew member – 1990
  M. N. Fowler, crew member – 1990
  S. A. Burton, crew member – 1990
  W. J. Barlow, crew member – 1990
- British Empire Medal
  Andrew Burden, Lifeboat Operations Manager – 2026KBH

== Cleethorpes lifeboats ==
=== Pulling and Sailing (P&S) lifeboat ===
ON (Note: ON is the RNLI's Official Number of the boat.)	Name	Built	On station	Class	Comments
Pre-511	Manchester Unity	1868	1868–1882	33-foot Peake Self-righting (P&S)	(Note: 33-foot x 8-foot 6in (10-oared) self-righting (P&S) lifeboat, gift of the Independent Order of Oddfellows, built by Woolfe of Shadwell, London, costing £287.); Lifeboat transferred to Grimsby. Broken up in 1887.

Station closed in 1882
Pre ON numbers are unofficial numbers used by the Lifeboat Enthusiasts' Society to reference early lifeboats not included on the official RNLI list.

=== Inshore lifeboats (Humber Mouth) ===
Op.No. (Note: Op. No. is the RNLI's Operational Number of the boat or vehicle carried on the hull.)	Name	On station	Class	Comments
D-56	Unnamed	1965–1972	D-class (RFD PB16)	
D-211	Unnamed	1973–1979	D-class (RFD PB16)	

Station Closed in 1980

=== Inshore lifeboats (Cleethorpes) ===
==== D-class ====
Op.No.	Name	On station	Class	Comments
D-325	Tricentrol II	1987–1994	D-class (EA16)	
D-454	Blue Peter VI	1994–2004	D-class (EA16)	
D-618	Blue Peter VI	2004–2012	D-class (IB1)	
D-757	James Burgess II	2012–2024	D-class (IB1)	
D-889	James and Deanna Adams	2024–	D-class (IB1)	

==== B-class ====
Op.No.	Name	On station	Class	Comments
B-942	Loving You	2025–	B-class (Atlantic 85)	

=== Launch and recovery tractors ===
Op. No.	Reg. No.	Type	On station	Comments
TW06	VRU 611S	Talus MB-764 County	2007–	
TW45Ha	T249 JNT	Talus MB-4H Hydrostatic (Mk.1)	2025–	

== See also ==
- List of RNLI stations
- List of former RNLI stations
- Royal National Lifeboat Institution lifeboats
