= Buckland, Devon =

Apart from a number of places in Devon, England, for which Buckland forms the first part of the name (see Buckland (disambiguation)), the name on its own refers to three places in Devon:

- Buckland, Braunton, a historic estate in North Devon
- Buckland is a hamlet near Thurlestone in the South Hams, at 50°16′46″N 3°51′22″W. It was listed as a manor in the Domesday Book.
- Buckland is a suburb of Newton Abbot, on the opposite side of the A380 road from the town centre, around 50°31′35″N 3°35′23″W. It is separated from Milber by Shaldon Road.
