= Hull Trinity House =

Seafaring organisation

Coordinates: 53°44′32″N 0°20′07″W

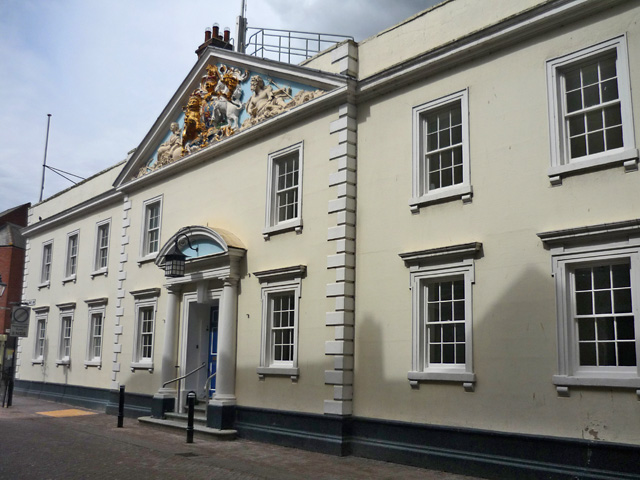
Trinity House building, built c. 1753

The Hull Trinity House, locally known as Trinity House, is a seafaring organisation consisting of a charity for seafarers, a school, and a guild of mariners. The guild originated as a religious guild providing support and almshouses for the needy, and established a school for mariners in 1787. By the 18th century it had responsibilities including management of the harbour at Hull, and buoys and pilotage in the Humber Estuary.

After the loss of many of its responsibilities as a result of the River Humber Conservancy Act 1852 (15 & 16 Vict. c. cxxx), the guild continued its work as a charity, and the provision of education, which continues to the present day.

The school, now known as Hull Trinity House Academy, is now a secondary boys' school.

The charity, Hull Trinity House Charity, supports seafarers and their families; supported by property holdings, it operates rest homes, as well as Welton Waters Activities Centre.

== History ==
The Trinity House was formally established in 1369, by the adoption of the 'first subscription deed', in which Robert Marshall (Alderman), and around fifty other people founded a guild, (Note: Allison 1969 states 56 persons, Sheahan 1864, p. 457 states 35 persons) the Guild of the Holy Trinity, similar to other religious guilds of the day – it would have masses said, attended at the Holy Trinity Church, buy candles, attend funerals, and aid any sick member of the guild. The subscription fee was 2 shillings. Initially there was no clear connection with maritime trades.

In 1457, (Note: Gillett & MacMahon 1980, p. 116 gives a date of 1464) Edward IV granted the rights of lowage and stowage (duties payable for loading and unloading), enabling the guild to build an almshouse and chapel for thirteen persons impoverished by some misfortune relating to seafaring. It is thought by Sheahan 1864, p. 458 that the guild amalgamated with a 'Shipmans Guild' in around 1457. The same year the property known as "Trinity House" was acquired from Carmelite friars. (It was rebuilt 1753.)

In 1541 Henry VIII re-affirmed the guild's right to charge lowage and stowage for the support of an almshouse with a charter, as well as the rights of a legal entity, such as the ability to sue or hold property. The charter was re-affirmed in 1547, 1554, and 1567. (Note: Sheahan 1864, p. 77 states that in 1545 during the suppression the Trinity House charity was dissolved, but was refounded in the next reign.)

In 1567 Elizabeth I granted the guild powers to settle disputes between ships' masters and seamen, and to prevent any seamen thought unfit to take charge of a vessel.

Under a 1581 charter the guild regulated the use of The Haven (late the Old harbour), and licensed pilots. It also positioned buoys and beacons in the Humber for navigation. The right to charge primage, a local import duty, was granted in the 1581 charter. By the 1600s most matters of governance and tolls relating to the Port of Hull were controlled by the Trinity House.

In 1625, Ferres, an elder brother of the guild founded an Almshouse, Ferres' Hospital; on his death it was taken over by the guild.

In 1680 Charles II appointed the guild as managers of the Haven, and affirmed the right to charge primage, set buoys, appoint pilots and make bylaws.

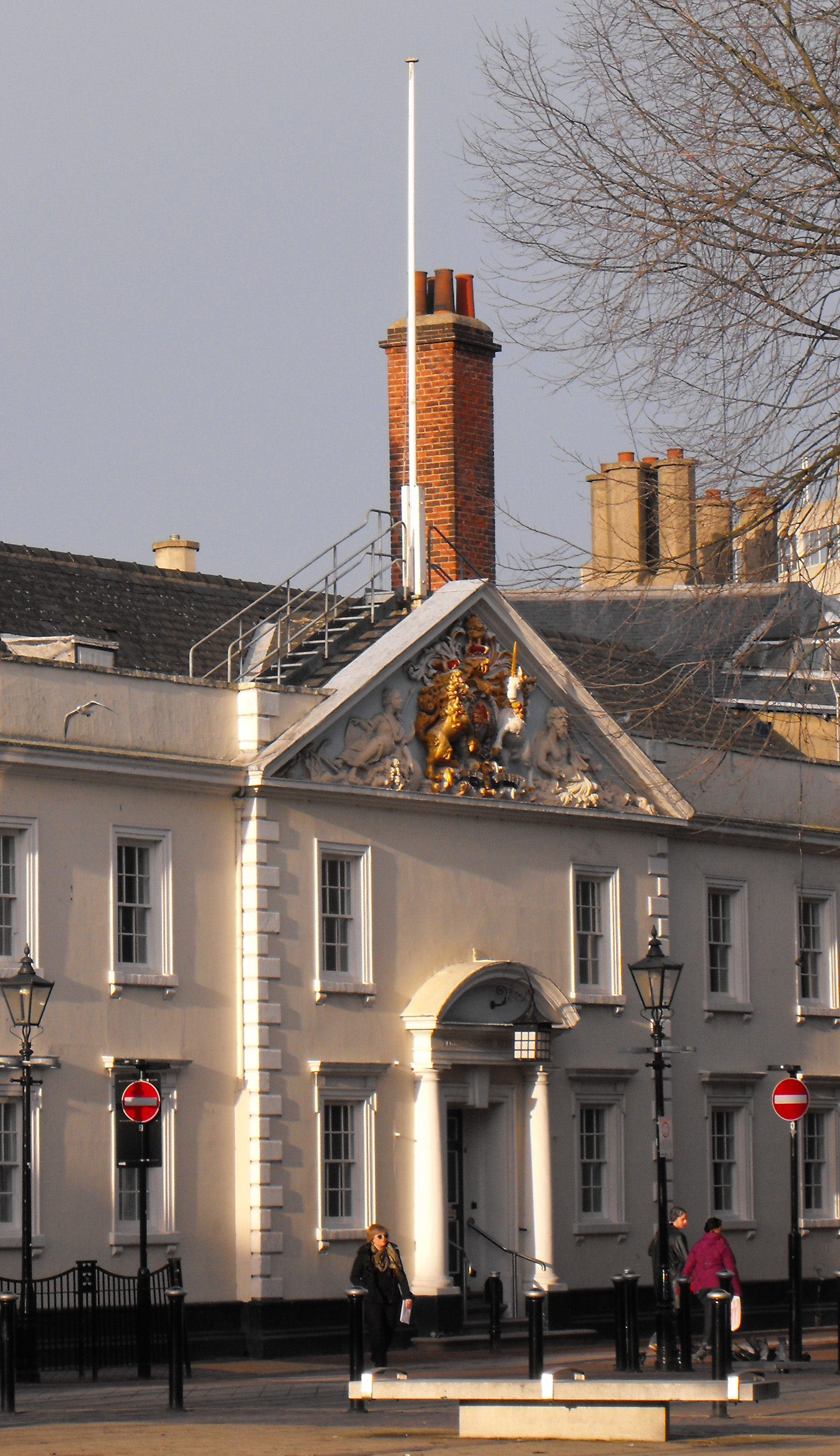
Trinity House

The Trinity House Building was rebuilt in 1753, and a guild house added in 1775 by the architect Joseph Page. The buildings were of brick, with stucco fronts, in a Tuscan style. Statues of Neptune and Britannia were installed above the main entrance, with the building forming a square around a courtyard, with almshouse rooms around it. In 1835 the guild had several other almshouses around the town.

The Trinity House became an important institution in Hull in the 17th, 18th, and 19th centuries, with some influence over civic matters, as well as supporting and opposing bills in parliament relating to the towns trade and port. The guild was cofounder of the Hull Dock Company, provided half the capital for the Humber Dock, and backed the creation of the West Dock Company (see West Dock, Kingston upon Hull). During this period members and institutions of the Trinity house were together with the Hull Corporation and other interests constant presences at visits to the town of royalty, nobles and other important persons. The guild was also the authority for other ports, such as Bridlington and the Port of Grimsby, and its members were consulted by the state on maritime matters. Waters north of Whitby were governed by a similar historic institution, Trinity House, Newcastle, which also still exists, but which has always been separate and distinct from its Hull counterpart.

During the late 16th, 17th and 18th centuries the guild both supported and opposed bills to construct lighthouses at Spurn and Flamborough; the Spurn Point Lighthouse Act 1766 (6 Geo. 3. c. 31) and the Spurn Point Lighthouse Act 1772 (12 Geo. 3. c. 29) placed lighthouse construction under the jurisdiction of the London Trinity House, whilst the Hull guild was responsible for lighting and maintenance. All responsibilities passed to the London guild in 1836.

In 1810 a lifeboat was set up at Spurn Point, funded by subscription, with a crew provided by the Trinity House. The lifeboat became the responsibility of the Humber Conservancy Board in 1908.

The guild reached the peak of its influence and power in the Napoleonic era, to the extent that it became the target of criticism and attack in the press. In 1852 the guild lost its monopoly on the Humber with the River Humber Conservancy Act 1852 (15 & 16 Vict. c. cxxx). Rights of lowage, stowage, and exclusive rights of pilotage were lost in the 19th century. The guild continued in its charitable and educational efforts after it had lost much of its power as regards shipping and pilotage.

=== Trinity House School ===
In 1785 a marine school was founded on the property of the Trinity House. A new building was constructed on the Trinity House site, adjacent to the chapel and the school opened in 1787 with 36 boys and with T. O. Rogers as master. Students were taught reading, writing, accountancy, religion, and navigation for three years after which they were apprenticed.

The school moved to a new building in 1842, and was split into lower and upper schools in 1849. By 1856 the school taught 98 boys; by the 1870s the school had 180 pupils.

By the second half of the 20th century the school ('Trinity House Navigation School') had become an independent secondary technical school. The school was modernised in 1956. In 1963 it had 180 pupils and was located at its 1842 site. A third floor was added to the school in 1973.

The school gained "specialist" status in 2008, and became an academy in 2012. In 2013 the school moved to a new site on George Street, using a refurbished former university building, the Derek Crothall building, formerly part of the University of Lincoln (ex Humberside Polytechnic) (ex Hull Nautical College until sometime in the 1980s).

In 2014 the site of the old school was approved for demolition. The site of the old school is now a car park/events area called Zebedee's Yard.

== See also ==
- Grade I listed buildings in the East Riding of Yorkshire
- Listed buildings in Kingston upon Hull (Myton Ward)

== Sources ==
- Allison, K. J., ed. (1969), "The Trinity House", A History of the County of York East Riding, vol. 1, the City of Kingston Upon Hull, pp. 397–407
- Allison, K. J., ed. (1969a), "Education", A History of the County of York East Riding, vol. 1, the City of Kingston Upon Hull, pp. 348–370
- Gillett, Edward; MacMahon, Kenneth A. (1980), A History of Hull, Oxford University Press, ISBN 0-19-713436-X
- Parsons, Edward (1835), The tourist's companion, or, The history of the scenes and places on the route by the rail-road and steam-packet from Leeds and Selby to Hull
- Sheahan, James Joseph (1864), General and concise history and description of the town and port of Kingston-Upon-Hull, Simpson, Marshall and Co. (London)

=== Further reading ===
- Harvey, A. S. (1950), The Trinity House of Kingston Upon Hull
- Jackson, Gordon (1972), Hull in the Eighteenth Century: A study in economic and social history, Oxford University Press, ISBN 0-19-713415-7
