= Frimley Green Windmill =

English tower mill

Frimley Green Mill

Origin
- Mill location: SU 896 562
- Coordinates: 51°17′53″N 0°42′54″W
- Operator(s): Private
- Year built: Late 18th century

Information
- Purpose: Corn mill
- Type: Tower mill
- Storeys: Four storeys
- No. of sails: Four sails

Frimley Green Windmill is a Grade II listed tower mill at Frimley Green, Surrey, England, which has been converted to residential use.

== History ==
Frimley Green Windmill was first mentioned in 1784 in the ownership of a Mr Terry. It passed to Thomas Lilley in 1792 and then William Collins in 1801. In 1803, the mill passed into the ownership of the Royal Military College, Sandhurst, remaining in the hands of the military until at least 1832 and probably much later than that. The mill was disused by 1870, and the derelict shell was converted to residential use in 1914.

== Description ==
Frimley Green Windmill is a four-storey brick tower mill. Little is known of the mill, although it had at least one pair of Spring or Patent sails.

== Millers ==
- George Marshall 1792
- John Banks 1801

Reference for above:-
