= Hurt Wood Mill, Ewhurst =

Tower mill at Ewhurst, Surrey, England

Ewhurst Windmill
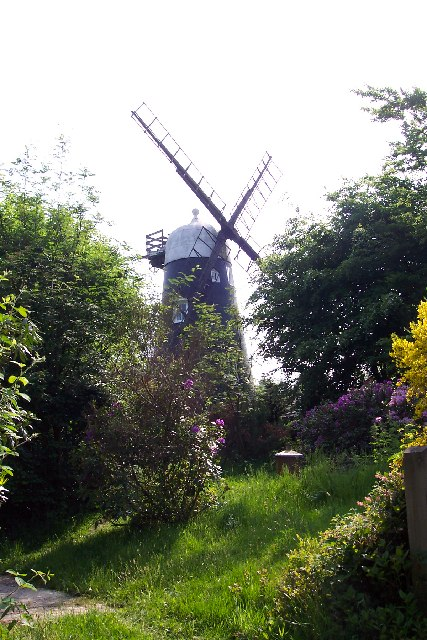
- The converted mill in 2003

Origin
- Mill name: Hurt Wood Mill
- Grid reference: TQ 078 427
- Coordinates: 51°10′23″N 0°27′32″W
- Operator: Private
- Year built: 1845

Information
- Purpose: Corn mill
- Type: Tower mill
- Storeys: Four storeys
- No. of sails: Four sails
- Type of sails: Patent sails
- Windshaft: Cast iron
- Winding: Fantail

Listed Building – Grade II
- Official name: Ewhurst Windmill
- Designated: 9 March 1960
- Reference no.: 1190554

Hurt Wood Mill is a grade II* listed tower mill at Ewhurst, Surrey, England, which has been converted to residential use.

== History ==
Hurt Wood Mill was built in 1845, replacing a post mill that had been blown down. The post mill was standing in 1648. The mill worked by wind until c1885 and the sails and fantail were removed shortly afterwards. The mill house was converted at some point, with two new sails being fitted in 1914. In 1937 four new sails and two new stocks were fitted by Neve's, the Heathfield millwrights.

== Description ==
Hurt Wood Mill is a four-storey brick tower mill with an ogee cap. It had four Patent sails carried on a cast iron windshaft. The cap was winded by a fantail. The clasp arm Brake Wheel is wooden. When the mill was a working mill, it had sails that rotated anticlockwise, but those fitted in 1937 would have rotated clockwise had they been a working set.

== Millers ==
- Richard Evelyn - 1648 (post mill)
- George Hard and Daniel Randell 1705
- John Twist 1718
- Edward Bennet 1730s
- William Bray and William Lassam 1748
- Jacob Lassam
- Mary White 1843
- David Lassam 1845 (tower mill)
- H Joyes 1855

References for above:-

== Culture and media ==
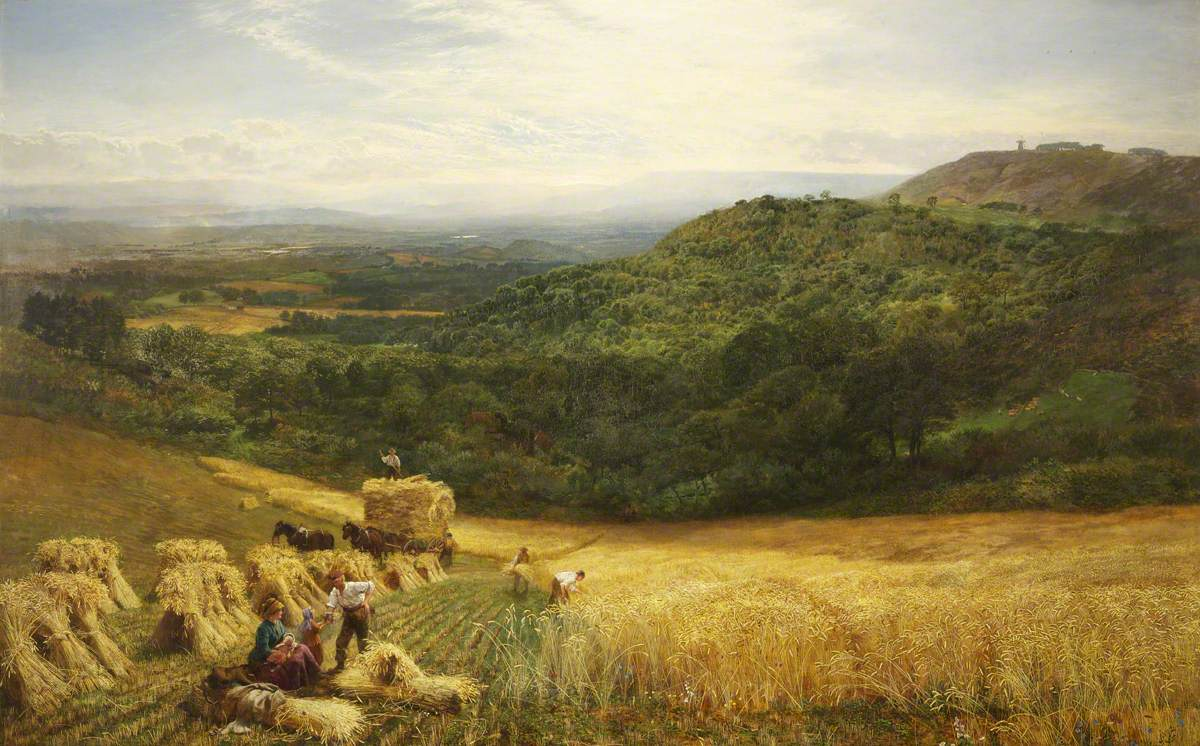
Harvest Time

Hurt Wood Mill appears on the crest of a hill in the painting, Harvest Time, by George Vicat Cole (1833–1893), which is now in Bristol City Museum and Art Gallery. It also appeared in an episode of The Tomorrow People titled The Doomsday Men.
