= Buckland Beacon =

Granite tor on Dartmoor in Devon, England

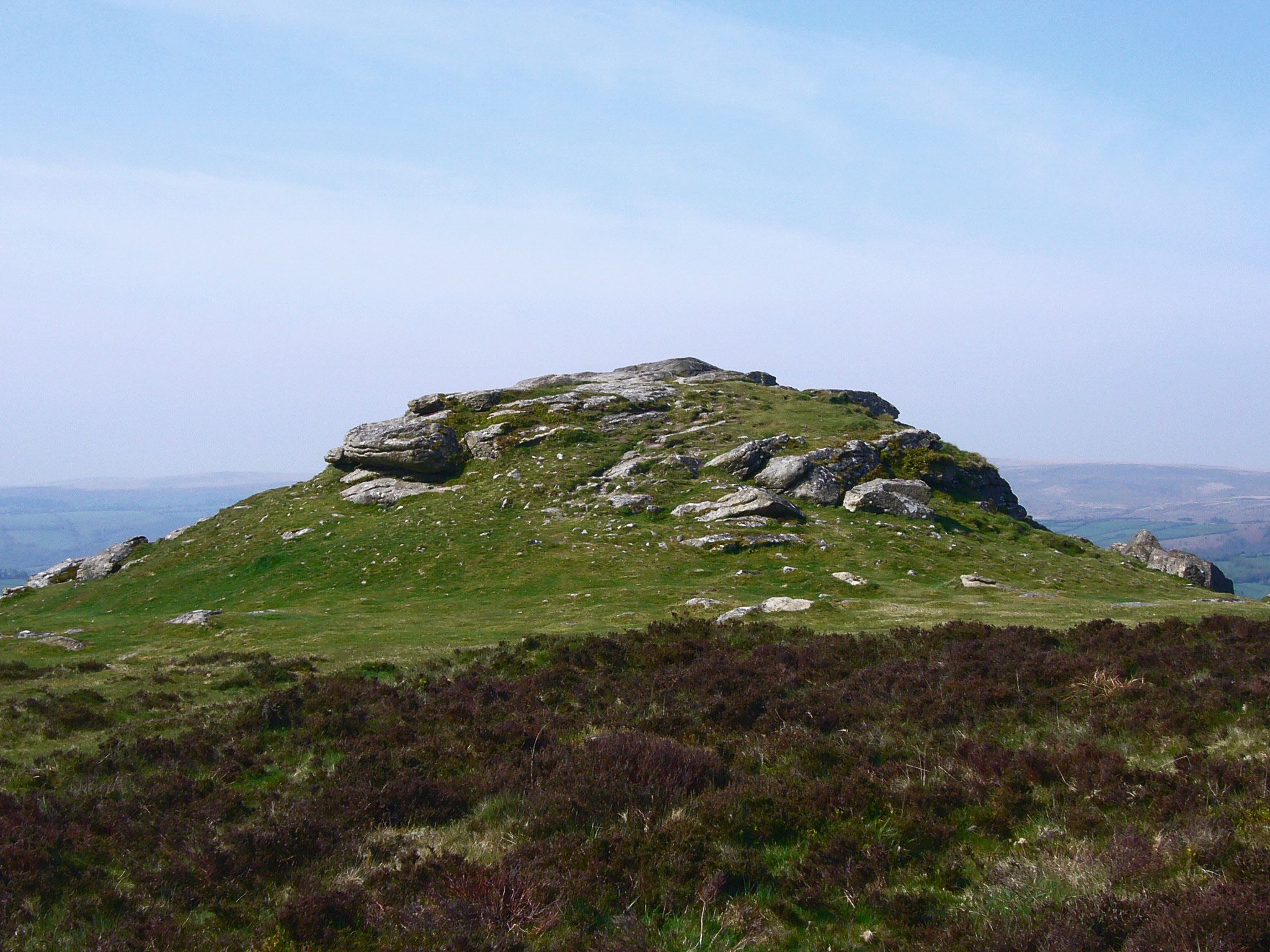

Highest point
- Elevation: 382 m (1,253 ft)
- Coordinates: 50°32′39″N 3°47′12″W

Geography
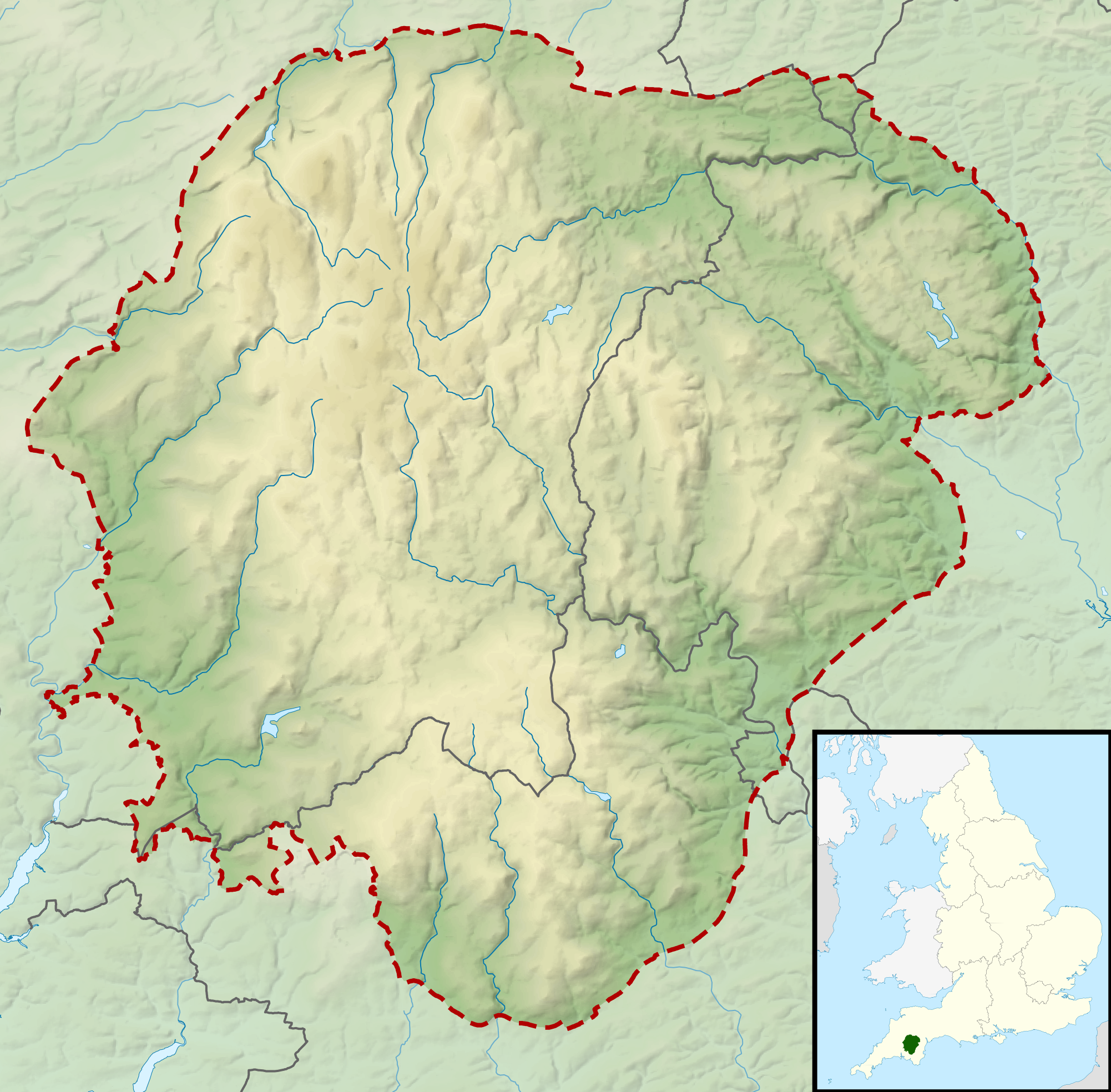
- Location within Dartmoor
- Location: Dartmoor, England
- OS grid: SX734731
- Topo map: OS Explorer OL28: Dartmoor

Climbing
- Easiest route: From Cold East Cross

Buckland Beacon is a granite tor and conical beacon, near to the village of Buckland-in-the-Moor on Dartmoor, England. It is well known for its Ten Commandments Stones, which are inscribed on its south eastern edge. It stands at 382 metres (1,253 ft) above sea level, overlooking the Dart Valley.

The elevated position meant that it was the location of a fire beacon to warn of danger, and the tor takes its name from this role.

== The Ten Commandments stones ==
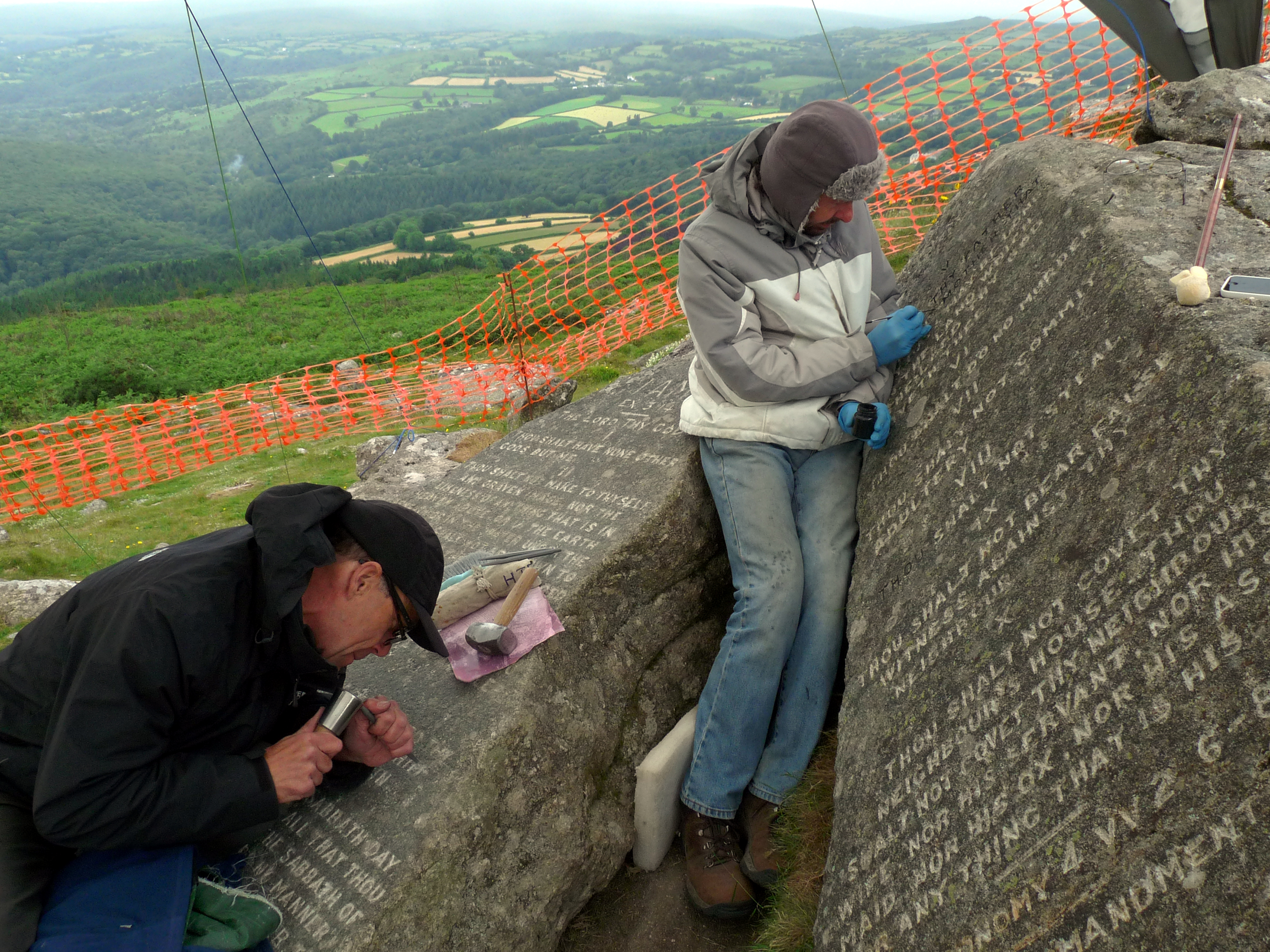
Stonemasons recutting the words on the Ten Commandments rocks in 2016

Buckland Beacon is famous for a number of the rocks around its base having been faced and cut with the wording of the Ten Commandments.

These were commissioned in 1927 by the land owner William Whitley, then resident at Wellstor, and Lord of Buckland Manor, and completed in 1928. The carving was done by local sculptor WA Clement, who worked directly from the current prayer book.

Mr Whitley ordered the Ten Commandments to be carved after he learned of plans to revise the Book of Common Prayer. The proposed revisions would have aligned the Church of England more closely with Catholic teachings and practices. Whitley was a dedicated Protestant, and opposed the changes.

The changes were defeated twice in the House of Commons, and the dates of these defeats in Parliament are also inscribed into the rocks, along with the verse from a hymn, and John 13:34. Also featured are the start and end dates of the carving work - December 15th 1927 - June 14th 1928.

The lettering has suffered from weathering, resulting in it needing to be recut a number of times. Most recently it was recut in 2016, at the cost of £16,000.

== Jubilee stone ==
In addition to the Ten Commandments, there is a further carved rock on the summit of the tor, called the Jubilee Stone.

The Jubilee Stone was inscribed in celebration of the Silver Jubilee of George V and reads:

1282 FT

BUCKLAND BEACON
A BEACON FIRE – ONE OF A CHAIN-
WAS LIT HERE BY THE PARISHIONERS
OF BUCKLAND-IN’THE-MOOR
IN CELEBRATION OF THEIR
MAJESTIES SILVER JUBILEE
MAY 6TH 1935
AND ALL OF THE PEOPLE SHOUTED

AND SAID GOD SAVE THE KING

Unlike the Ten Commandments rocks, the Jubilee Stone has not been upkept, and is now barely visible.

It is also notable that the inscription states 1282ft, which is nearly 50 feet (15 m) shorter than the actual height of the beacon recorded by Ordnance Survey.

The beacon was also used for chains of fire beacons for the millennium celebrations in 2000, and for subsequent jubilees, including those of Queen Elizabeth II.
