= New Mill, Tadworth =

Windmill in Tadworth, Surrey, England

Tadworth Windmill
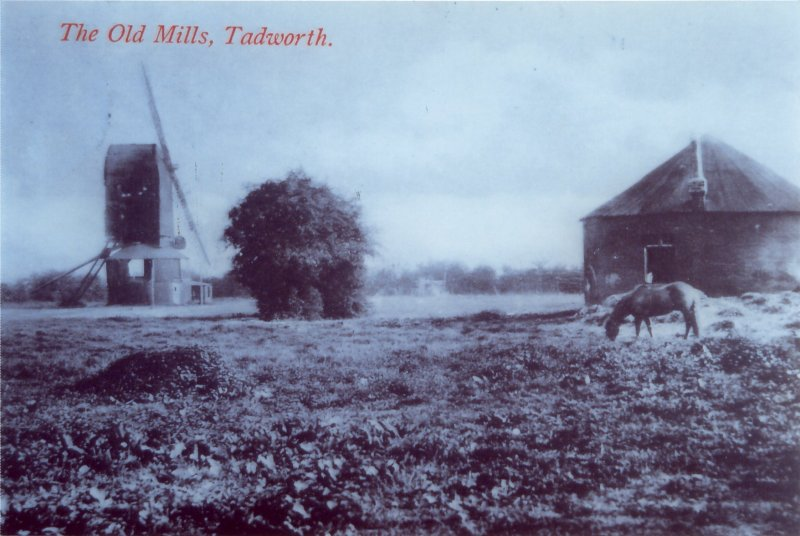
- The mill c.1910, with the roundhouse of the other mill in the foreground
- Interactive map of Tadworth Windmill

Origin
- Mill name: New Mill
- Grid reference: TQ 236 555
- Coordinates: 51.285°N 0.229°W
- Operator: Private
- Year built: c1762

Information
- Purpose: Corn mill
- Type: Post mill
- Roundhouse storeys: Two storeys
- No. of sails: Four sails
- Type of sails: Spring Patent sails
- Windshaft: Cast iron
- Winding: Tailpole
- No. of pairs of millstones: Two pairs
- Other information: Tallest surviving post mill in Surrey

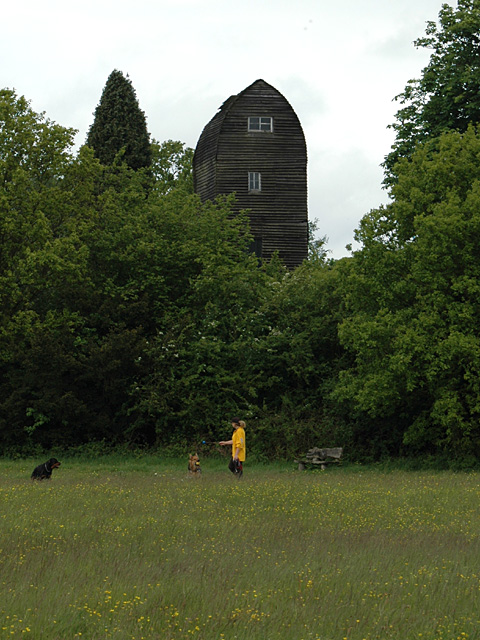
The mill in 2005

New Mill is a grade II listed post mill at Tadworth, Surrey, England which is on the Buildings at Risk Register.

== History ==
It is not known when New Mill was built, but is thought to have been in the mid eighteenth century. A windmill was recorded at Walton-on-the-Hill in 1295, the earliest in Surrey. A windmill at Tadworth was sold in 1600 and a windmill on Banstead Common was mentioned in a survey of the Manor of Banstead for Sir Nicholas Carew in 1680. An Act of Parliament in 1755 mentions the windmill, which was marked on Rocque's map of 1762. The mill lost two sails in 1893, and worked by wind until 1902, latterly assisted by a steam engine. Another post mill stood close by until 1890.

The second pair of sails fell off in a drought in 1921. The mill was damaged by a bomb in 1941 and again by a flying bomb in 1944. Repairs were carried out in 1950. Recently, concerns have been raised about the condition of the mill, and basic repairs are planned. In January 2009, Reigate and Banstead Council agreed to spend £37,000 on urgent repairs to the mill, which had been placed on the Buildings at Risk Register. An urgent works notice was served on the owner, giving the council the authority to carry out the work itself and claim back the cost from the owner of the mill.

== Description ==
New Mill is a post mill on a two-storey roundhouse, the only such roundhouse in Surrey. It had four Spring Patent sails fixed to a cast iron windshaft.

Its 8-foot (2.44 m) diameter Brake Wheel of cast iron has 120 teeth. It drove two pairs of millstones in the breast via spur gearing; its Spur Wheel has a 3-foot-6-inch (1.07 m) diameter. Winding is by tailpole.

== Millers ==
- John May 1780 - 1789
- George May 1789 -
- John Smith 1795 - 1831, 1834
- Mrs E Smith 1845
- J H Smith 1874 - 1878
- E W Smith 1887 - 1903

References for above:-
