= Buckland, Surrey =

Village and civil parish in Surrey, England

Coordinates: 51°14′38″N 0°15′18″W

Buckland
- Village and civil parish
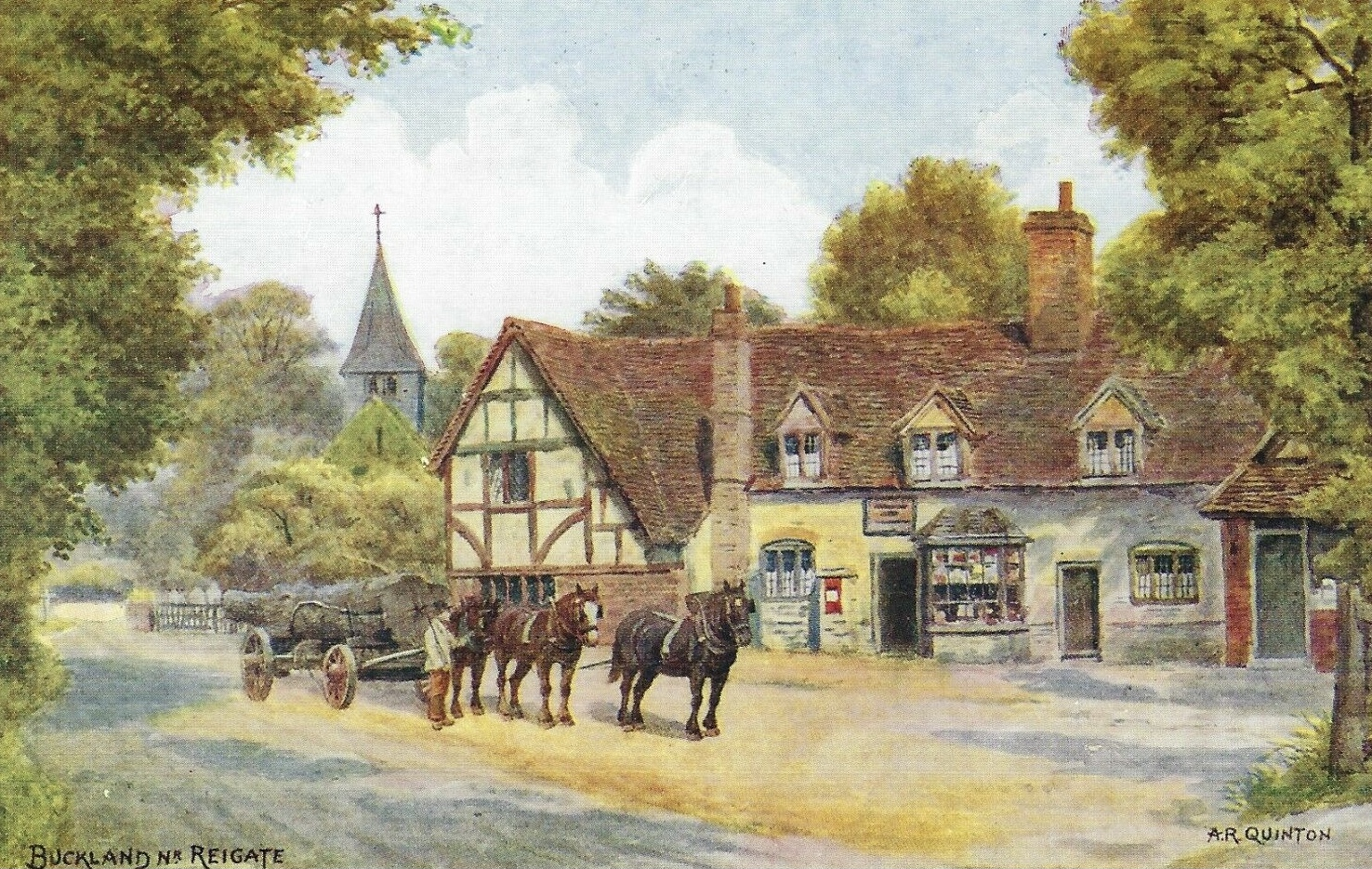
- A view in the village, c. 1920

- Location within Surrey
- Area: 5.51 km^{2} (2.13 sq mi)
- Population: 562 (Civil Parish 2011)
  - Density: 102/km^{2} (260/sq mi)
- OS grid reference: TQ2251
- Civil parish: Buckland
- District: Mole Valley
- Shire county: Surrey
- Region: South East
- Country: England
- Sovereign state: United Kingdom
- Post town: Betchworth
- Postcode district: RH3
- Dialling code: 01737
- Police: Surrey
- Fire: Surrey
- Ambulance: South East Coast
- UK Parliament: Dorking and Horley

Buckland is a village and civil parish in the Mole Valley district of Surrey, England, between Dorking and Reigate, its nearest towns. The civil parish is bordered by the North Downs escarpment in the north. The area contains a number of sand pits.

== Geography ==
Buckland is in the Mole Valley district of Surrey, 2 mi (3.2 km) east of Reigate and 4 mi (6.4 km) west of Dorking. The village is at the northern edge of the Weald, at the foot of the North Downs.

The south of the civil parish, which includes the village centre, is on the strata of the Lower Greensand Group. Sand is quarried from the Folkestone Beds and silver sand occurs in seams between Buckland and Reigate. The Gault clay forms a 0.5 mi-wide (0.80 km) band, running from east to west, to the north of the village centre. Fossils of Serpula antiquata, Neohibolites listeri and Euhoplites species have been found in this stratum. Hearthstone was quarried from the Upper Greensand at the base of the North Downs until the early 20th century. This layer contains fossils of bivalve species, including several from the genus Pecten.

== History ==
The earliest surviving record of Buckland is the Domesday Book of 1086, in which it appears as Bochelant. The settlement is recorded as Boclande in 1225, Boclond in 1225, Bukelonde in 1293 and Bukkelond in 1448. The name is generally agreed to mean "land held by book or charter".

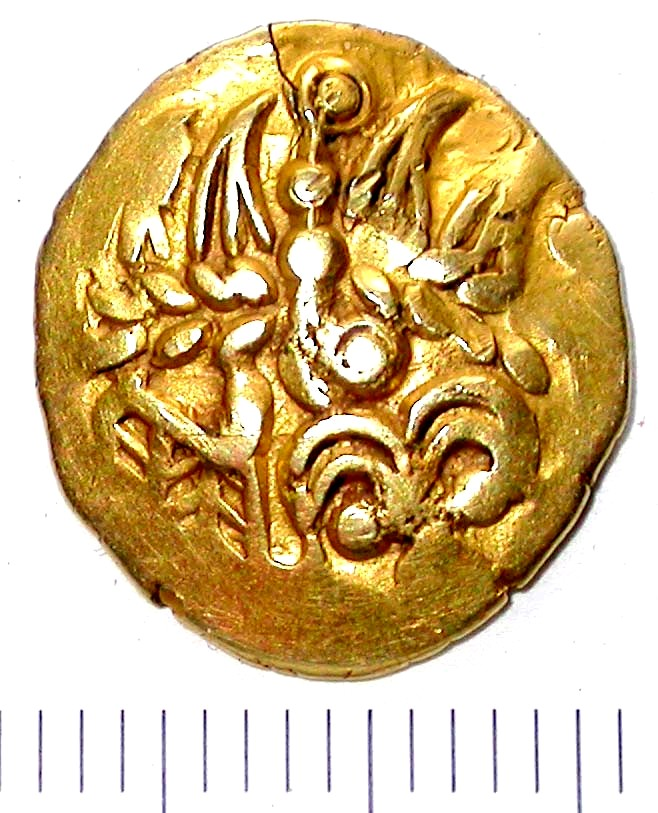
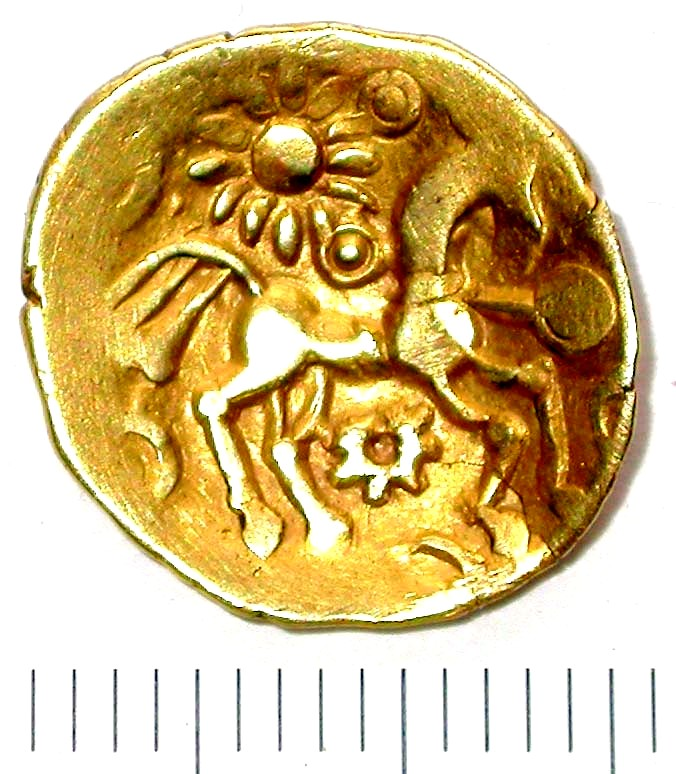
The front (left) and back faces of a gold, Iron Age quarter stater coin, found in Buckland in 1995 and dated to c. 60 – c. 20 BCE

The earliest evidence of human activity in the village is a flint axe fragment from the Neolithic. A side-looped spearhead from the Middle Bronze Age, dated to c. 1400 – c. 1200 BCE, was found by workmen in 1907.

In 1086, the manor was held by John, a lesser tenant of Richard of Tonbridge. Buckland had a church, watermill and thirty-five heads of household. Of these, seventeen farmed the land owned by the feudal lord, and ten were serfs.

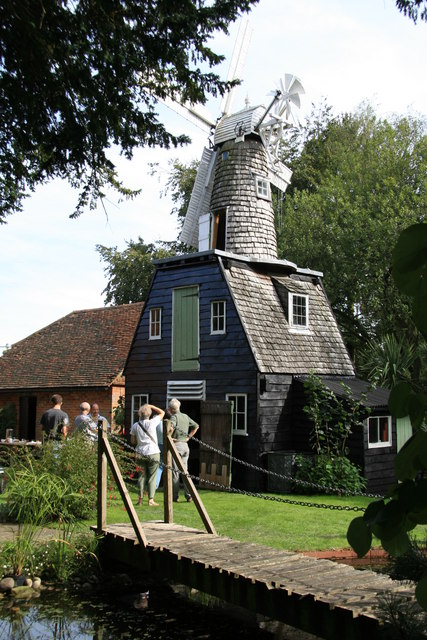
Buckland Mill

The village church of St Mary the Virgin was built in 1380. It is a Grade II listed building. The church was rebuilt in 1859-60, under the supervision of the architect, Henry Woodyer. A new, wider chancel arch was constructed and a new organ chamber and vestry added on the north side. Some of the timbers removed during Woodyer's work, may have been reused in the construction of Buckland Windmill, also Grade II listed, and now a tourist focal point.

The barn on The Green dates from the early 17th century. The timber-framed structure, which was restored in the 20th century, has a tower at the south end, topped by a weathervane. The barn was used as a temporary church during the Woodyer reconstruction work and was converted to a private house in the early 1980s.

The first school in Buckland, a National school, was founded in 1822. Its replacement, designed by Woodyer, opened in 1862. It closed in 1981 and the building is now a private house.

Buckland War Memorial, on the village green, was erected in 1920 and was unveiled in July of that year by Percival Marling VC. Designed by Ebbutt and Sons of Croydon, it is constructed in rough Cornish granite in the form of a wheel-head cross.

=== Local legend ===
Buckland is also the location of the source of the Shag Brook, a tributary of the River Mole. Local legend says the brook was the home of a monstrous horse (in some versions a gorilla), called the "Buckland Shag". This beast would drag travellers from the nearby coaching road and devour them on the Shag Stone, a large boulder in the brook with a blood red vein of iron ore running through it. The monster was exorcised by the local parson, Willoughby Bertie, and the stone was removed from the brook c. 1757.

The legend of the Buckland Shag was revived in 1986 by a local morris side, The Buckland Shag Morris Men.

== Amenities ==
Buckland has a village store and a pub, The Pheasant, on the Reigate Road.

== Transport ==
The A25 runs east–west through the parish. The nearest railway station is Betchworth on the North Downs Line, 1 mile (1.6 km) WNW of the village centre.

== Governance ==
Surrey County Council, elected every four years, has one representative from Buckland for Dorking Rural. Two councillors sit on the Mole Valley District Council.

== Demography and housing ==
2011 Census Homes
Output area	Detached	Semi-detached	Terraced	Flats and apartments	Caravans/temporary/mobile homes	shared between households
(Civil Parish)	118	76	13	25	4	0

The average level of accommodation in the region composed of detached houses was 28%, the average that was apartments was 22.6%.

2011 Census Key Statistics
Output area	Population	Households	% Owned outright	% Owned with a loan	hectares
(Civil Parish)	562	236	39.8%	30.5%	551

The proportion of households in the civil parish who owned their home outright compares to the regional average of 35.1%. The proportion who owned their home with a loan compares to the regional average of 32.5%. The remaining % is made up of rented dwellings (plus a negligible % of households living rent-free).
