= Buckland Windmill =

Historic windmill in Surrey, England

Buckland Mill
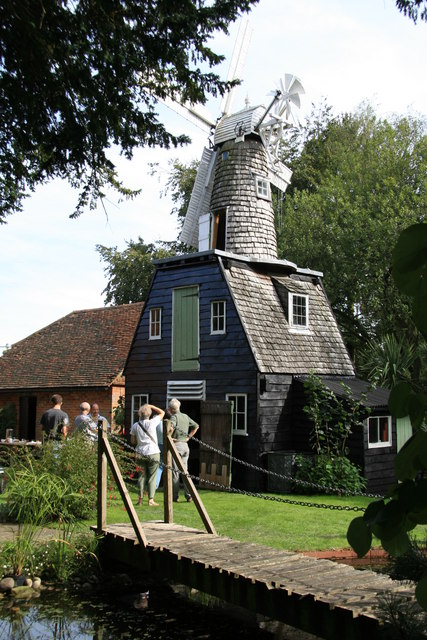
- The mill in 2006

Origin
- Mill name: Buckland Mill
- Grid reference: TQ 221 507
- Coordinates: 51.242627°N 0.252694°W
- Operator: Private
- Year built: Mid-19th century

Information
- Purpose: Saw mill
- Type: smock mill
- Storeys: Two-storey smock
- Base storeys: Single-storey base
- Smock sides: Circular smock
- No. of sails: Four sails
- Type of sails: Patent sails
- Winding: Fantail
- Fantail blades: Six blades

Buckland Windmill is a grade II listed smock mill at Buckland, Surrey, England which has been restored to working order. It is the only surviving wind saw mill in the United Kingdom.

== History ==
Buckland Windmill was built by William Cooper, the Henfield millwright, sometime in the 1860s or 1870s. It stands in the grounds of a house that was lived in by the carpenters of the Buckland Court Estate. The windmill was discovered in 1995, with a mature yew tree standing very close to it. When the owners contacted the Society for the Protection of Ancient Buildings for advice, they were surprised to find that it existed, because the mill had been missed by Ken Farries and Martin Mason, and omitted from their comprehensive work on windmills in the county.

== Restoration ==
The restoration of the mill took place over a number of years, starting in 1995-97 when the building was repaired and made weatherproof. In 1999-2001 the cap frame was constructed and the sails refitted. From 2003, the mill was put into working order. The work was funded by grants from the BAA (Environmental Grants Scheme), at Gatwick, Department for Environment, Food and Rural Affairs (Rural Enterprise Scheme), Mole Valley District Council and Surrey Historic Buildings Trust. The millwrights were Tony Hole, of Dorothea Restorations and Vincent Pargeter, who was responsible for the sails. The restored mill turned by wind for the first time in February 2004.

== Awards ==
The restoration of the mill was recognised by awards from the Surrey Historic Buildings Trust in March 2004 and the Surrey Industrial History Group in July 2004.

== Description ==
Buckland Windmill is a small circular smock mill built on a two-storey building. It has a small cap and is powered by four Patent sails. The cap is winded by a fantail.
