= Silver sand =

White sand used in gardening

Silver sand is a fine white sand used in gardening. It consists largely of quartz particles that are not coated with iron oxides. Iron oxides colour sand from yellows to rich browns. Silver sand is also used as a constituent of mortar for laying light coloured pavers.
