= Westcott, Surrey =

Village in Surrey, England

Coordinates: 51.224°N 0.362°W

Westcott
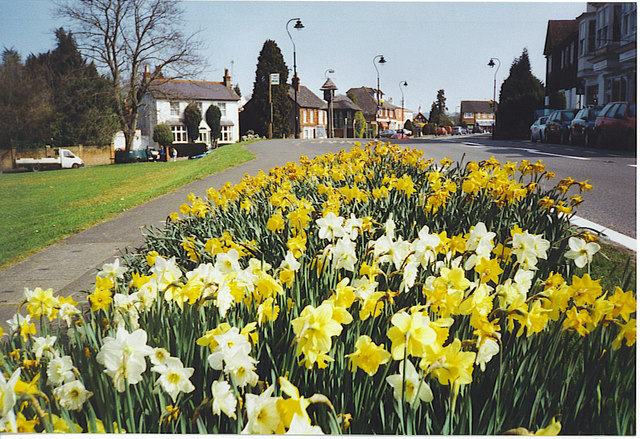
- Village green area with flowers

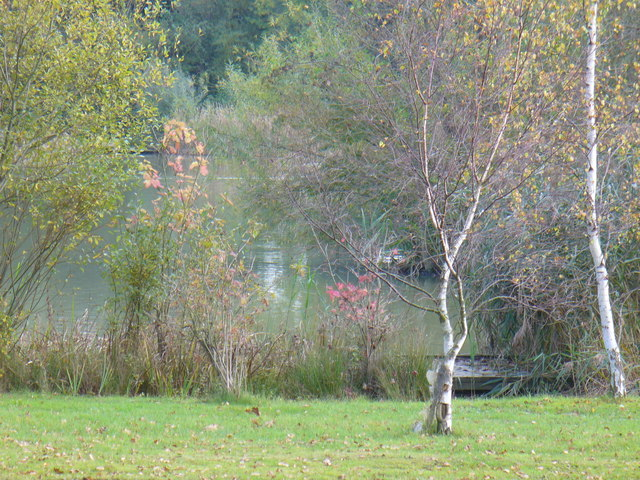
- A dammed part of the Pipp Brook forms the Lake at Westcott

- Location within Surrey
- Population: 2,251 (2011 census)
- OS grid reference: TQ1448
- District: Mole Valley
- Shire county: Surrey
- Region: South East
- Country: England
- Sovereign state: United Kingdom
- Post town: Dorking
- Postcode district: RH4
- Dialling code: 01306
- Police: Surrey
- Fire: Surrey
- Ambulance: South East Coast
- UK Parliament: Dorking and Horley

Westcott is a village in central Surrey, England, about 1.5 miles (2.5 km) west of the centre of Dorking. It is in the Mole Valley district and the Surrey Hills Area of Outstanding Natural Beauty. The Pipp Brook, a tributary of the River Mole, runs to the north of the centre and the settlement is between Ranmore Common on the North Downs and Leith Hill on the Greensand Ridge.

== Geography ==
Westcott lies predominantly on the Lower Greensand, with the Upper Greensand and chalk of the North Downs to the north. The village is in the catchment area of the Pipp Brook which rises in Wotton Common. The stream then flows past the village centre near its northern farmland, running through Dorking and joining the River Mole at Pixham. Mag's Well, one of the sources of Pipp Brook, is in Squire's Wood, south of Westcott. It was formerly of some repute as a medicinal spring, and is strongly impregnated with iron. A building, ruined, existed over it, and in the Victorian period children still bathed in it.

The A25 road runs through the centre of Westcott and links the village to Guildford, to the west, and Dorking, to the east. There is a thatched dovecote on the village green. The weather vane on top of the dovecote has had the "N" replaced by a "T" so that it shows the letters "WEST".

== History ==
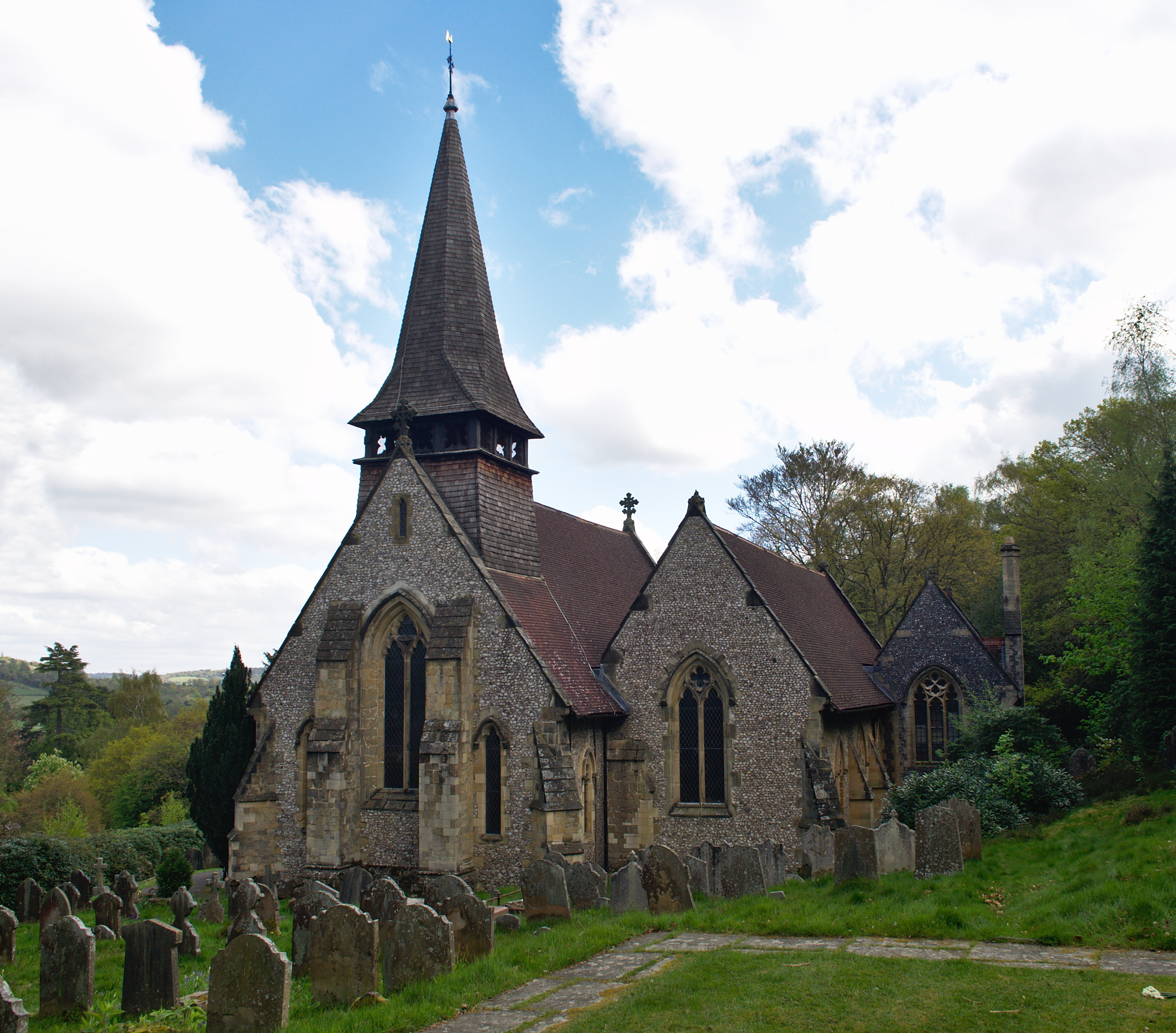
Holy Trinity Church in Westcott

The earliest surviving record of the village is from the Domesday Book of 1086, in which it appears as Wescote. In the early 13th century, it is recorded as Westcot (1202) and Westcotes (c. 1210). The name is generally agreed to refer to a group of cottages in the western part of the parish of Dorking.

The earliest evidence of human activity in Westcott is from the Mesolithic. Flint flakes and implements from this period, the Neolithic and Bronze Age have been found to the north of the village. An excavation in the same area revealed evidence of an Iron Age enclosure, which also included some items of Roman origin. A brass Roman cavalry pendant, dated to the first century CE, was discovered in the village in 1998.

In Domesday Book, the manor was held by Ralph of Fougères as tenant-in-chief. It was in the Wotton Hundred and had a population of 14 villagers, five smallholders and three slaves. Westcott included 2.5 acres (1.0 ha) of meadow, sufficient woodland for 30 swine and a watermill. It produced an annual income of 8 pounds for the lord of the manor.

Bury Hill, between Dorking and Westcott, was recorded in the 15th century. It became a manor, formed from waste (infertile land) of the manor of Milton, Dorking. James Walter bought the land in 1753, built the house there, and planted the grounds. He died 1780, after which the 3rd Viscount Grimston, his daughter's husband, succeeded him. In 1812, his son and heir, about to be created Earl of Verulam, sold the property to a wealthy Scot, Robert Barclay, and it descended to his Barclay heir in the Edwardian period, when The Nower was "a favourite place to walk for Dorking people". He was the ancestor of comedy executive/producer Humphrey Barclay.

Many pre-1800 listed buildings, including some that are thatched, are in the lanes leading off the A25, including Leslie Howard's (actor 1893–1943) Stowe Maries, built in the 1550s, in Balchins Lane. Milton Street and Westcott Street lead to several more old buildings. The Church of the Holy Trinity is Grade II listed because it was designed in 1851, by Sir George Gilbert Scott, and is made of knapped flint with ashlar quoins/dressings. Its spire has a clock, striking bell and weather vane, and there is a small western turret. Charles Barclay of Bury Hill gave equivalent to £120,702 in 2025 for it to be built, and Lady Mary Leslie the same, as an endowment. The clock was installed to commemorate the Jubilee of 1887. The parsonage was built at the expense of Barclay and the secular Westcott School was built by subscription in 1854. The infant school was also built by subscription, in 1882.

It became a chapelry of Dorking in the Victorian period. It contributed significantly to the wealth and trade of the town, principally from wool and meat from sheep farming on the North Downs within the parish bounds.

== Economy and amenities ==
The average distance travelled to work was 17 kilometres (11 mi) in 2001.

The Prince of Wales, the only remaining public house in the village, was damaged by fire in March 2023. Westcott has an art gallery, a small shop, a bicycle shop and a hairdressers. The main village grocery store, which included the post office, closed in December 2016.

Westcott Church of England primary school celebrated its 150th anniversary in 2004. In 2010, it was merged with Abinger Common CEP school to create a two-campus school known as the Surrey Hills Church of England Primary School.

In 2009, a skate ramp and football goals were installed in the village park.

== Demography and housing ==
2011 Census Homes
Ward	Detached	Semi-detached	Terraced	Flats and apartments	Caravans/temporary/mobile homes/houseboats	Shared between households
Westcott	339	309	126	143	1	0

The average level of accommodation in the region composed of detached houses was 28%, the average that was apartments was 22.6%.

2011 Census Households
Ward	Population	Households	% Owned outright	% Owned with a loan	hectares
Westcott	2,251	918	39	34	978

The proportion of households who owned their home outright compares to the regional average of 35.1%. The proportion who owned their home with a loan compares to the regional average of 32.5%. The remaining % is made up of rented dwellings (plus a negligible % of households living rent-free).
