= SES Water =

British water supply company

Coordinates: 51.246050°N 0.166255°W

Sutton and East Surrey Water plc

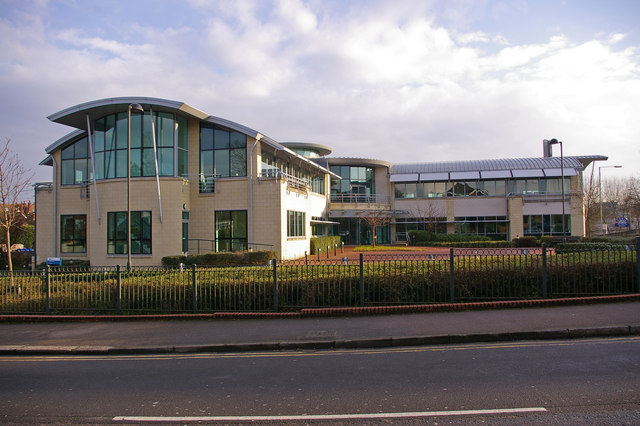
- Headquarters on London Road, Redhill
- Formerly: East Surrey Water plc (1989–1996)
- Type: Private
- Industry: Water supply services
- Founded: 1996
- Headquarters: Redhill, Surrey, England, United Kingdom
- Parent: Pennon Group (Note: SESW Holding Company Limited is wholly owned by Sutton And East Surrey Group Holdings Limited, which itself was, from 2016–2024, owned half by Osaka Gas UK, Ltd. and half by Summit Water Limited, and has been wholly owned by Pennon Group plc since 2024.)
- Website: seswater.co.uk

Sutton and East Surrey Water plc, trading as SES Water, is the UK water supply company to its designated area of east Surrey, West Sussex, west Kent and south London serving in excess of 282,000 homes and businesses and a population of approximately 675,000 people.

An area of 322 square miles (830 km^{2}), extending from Morden and South Croydon in the north to Gatwick Airport in the south, and from Cobham and Dorking in the west to Edenbridge and Bough Beech in the east forms the company's supply area.

== Corporate status ==
Sutton and East Surrey Water (trading as SES Water since 2017) is a public limited company registered in England and Wales with company number 2447875, that is not Stock Exchange listed, and is East Surrey Water plc renamed following a 1996 merger. (Note: The present incorporation was registered in 1989 as East Surrey Water plc and is a renaming following a transfer of some of its share capital and adoption of a new brand.)

In 2013, the Japanese trading company Sumitomo Corp. acquired Summit Water UK Ltd, the holding company of Sutton and East Surrey Water plc for £164.5m. Later in the year Sumitomo sold half of the holding in Summit Water to Osaka Gas Co., with the joint venture being renamed as Sumisho Osaka Gas Water UK Ltd.

In January 2024, Pennon Group (who also own South West Water, Bristol Water and Bournemouth Water) acquired SES Water from Sumitomo Corp. in a £380mn deal.

== History ==
Surrey has few surface water sources, but two major aquifers, one of chalk and the other of Lower Greensand, across the county from east to west. To the north of SES Water's area, the chalk appears as outcrops from the tertiary beds which lie on top of it, and there are springs at the Bookhams, Fetcham, Leatherhead and Sutton as a consequence. Further south, the aquifers are reached by wells, with the deepest wells used to extract water from the chalk aquifer. That at Polesden Lacey is 510 feet (155 m) deep.

The area was initially served by a number of small water companies, each supplying water to its local population. The setting up of water companies was made easier by the Waterworks Clauses Act 1847 (10 & 11 Vict. c. 17), which enabled new companies to be created by obtaining a special act, rather than needing a full act of Parliament. The new legislation meant that the powers of such companies were standardised. Sutton and East Surrey Water has been formed by a number of mergers and takeovers of these smaller companies.

=== East Surrey Water ===
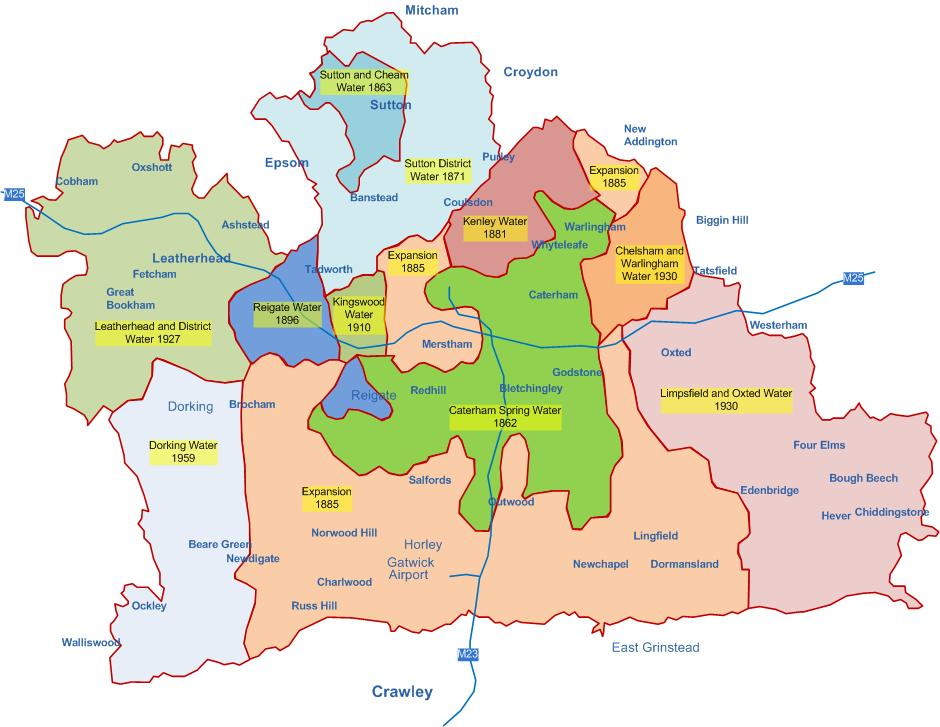
Map of the component companies that amalgamated to become Sutton and East Surrey Water

Caterham Spring Water Company's Act 1862
- Act of Parliament
- Parliament of the United Kingdom
- Long title: An Act for incorporating a Company, under the Title of "The Caterham Spring Water Company," for better supplying with Water the Inhabitants of Caterham and the Neighbourhood thereof.
- Citation: 25 & 26 Vict. c. lxxxiii

Dates
- Royal assent: 30 June 1862

Text of statute as originally enacted

The development of a public water supply in the Sutton and East Surrey area can be traced back to 1859, when a small housing development took place on Caterham Hill. The builder, a Mr. Drew, thought he would enhance the value of the development by providing a water supply, so constructed a borehole and some short lengths of water main, together with a pumping engine. However, the costs of running the plant were higher than he had anticipated, and he found a group of businessmen who were keen to buy it. Following the opening of the London and Brighton Railway in 1841, a community had been established at "Red Hill" or Warwick Town, and as it was growing fast, the businessmen were keen to supply it with water. They obtained a special act of Parliament, the Caterham Spring Water Company's Act 1862 (25 & 26 Vict. c. lxxxiii), which established the Caterham Spring Water Company, with a mandate to supply drinking water to Bletchingley, Caterham, Chaldon, Coulsdon, Earlswood, Godstone, Nutfield, Redhill, Reigate and Warlingham. Despite early struggles, the company developed, and by 1880 were supplying water to two-thirds of Redhill and a number of villages, but their water supplies were inadequate, and they looked to find other sources.

Caterham Spring Water Company's Act 1881
- Act of Parliament
- Parliament of the United Kingdom
- Long title: An Act to authorise a lease of the Kenley Waterworks to the Caterham Spring Water Company; to increase the number of directors of the Company, and to enable them to raise further money; and for other purposes.
- Citation: 44 & 45 Vict. c. ccvii

Dates
- Royal assent: 22 August 1881

Text of statute as originally enacted

East Surrey Water Act 1885
- Act of Parliament
- Parliament of the United Kingdom
- Long title: An Act to extend the District of the Caterham Spring Water Company to change their Name to authorise the company to raise additional Capital and for other purposes.
- Citation: 48 & 49 Vict. c. xxviii

Dates
- Royal assent: 21 May 1885

Text of statute as originally enacted

A little to the north, the Kenley Waterworks Company had been founded in 1869 with several wells, but the area between Caterham and Purley was at the time sparsely populated, and so there were few customers for the water. Following discussions between them, there was an amalgamation under the Caterham Spring Water Company's Act 1881 (44 & 45 Vict. c. ccvii). Parliament sanctioned an extension of their area of supply southwards to the Sussex border in 1884, and under the East Surrey Water Act 1885 (48 & 49 Vict. c. xxviii), the companies merged to become the East Surrey Water Company. They continued to expand, taking over a number of smaller water supply companies.

East Surrey Water Act 1896
- Act of Parliament
- Parliament of the United Kingdom
- Long title: An Act to authorise the transfer of certain Waterworks to the East Surrey Water Company and to extend the limits of supply of and confer further powers upon that Company and for other purposes.
- Citation: 59 & 60 Vict. c. cxxvii

Dates
- Royal assent: 20 July 1896

Text of statute as originally enacted

The Reigate Water Works Company had been established in 1858 to serve the population of Reigate, and in 1896, opted to sell its assets to East Surrey Water. The Corporation of Reigate were unaware of this, and when they learned of it, attempted to delay the parliamentary bill which would have formalised the deal. When this ploy failed, they tried to remove the town clerk from office, for his failure to notify the council of the deal. The town clerk was also a director of Reigate Water Works Company. Reigate Corporation also failed in this course of action, and so resorted to promoting a rival bill, which would have allowed them to alter the rates and charges that East Surrey Water could set. Their action caused widespread hostility in the press, and a compromise was eventually reached, with East Surrey Water making small changes to the charges for baths and additional water closets, and the East Surrey Water Act 1896 (59 & 60 Vict. c. cxxvii) was passed. Expansion continued, with capital works including 26 miles (42 km) of new mains in 1900 and 23 miles (37 km) in 1901. This included a new trunk main from Kenley through Purley to Merstham in 1900 and another from Merstham to Nutfield in 1901. A new borehole was built in Purley in both years, and the company attracted 758 new consumers in 1900 and 551 in 1901.

Leatherhead and District Waterworks Act 1883
- Act of Parliament
- Parliament of the United Kingdom
- Long title: An Act for incorporating and conferring Powers on the Leatherhead and District Waterworks Company.
- Citation: 46 & 47 Vict. c. xvii

Dates
- Royal assent: 31 May 1883
Other legislation
Repealed by	East Surrey Water Order 1963

Status: Repealed

East Surrey Water Act 1927
- Act of Parliament
- Parliament of the United Kingdom
- Long title: An Act to provide for the transfer to the East Surrey Water Company of the undertaking of the Leatherhead and District Waterworks Company to extend the area of supply of the East Surrey Water Company and authorise them to raise additional capital and for other purposes.
- Citation: 17 & 18 Geo. 5. c. civ

Dates
- Royal assent: 29 July 1927

Text of statute as originally enacted

The Leatherhead and District Water Company had been established in 1883, when the Leatherhead and District Waterworks Act 1883 (46 & 47 Vict. c. xvii) was granted which created the company, and authorised them to build wells and a pumping station on land close to the River Mole and the London, Brighton and South Coast Railway, in the parish of Fetcham, just to the west of Leatherhead. This was connected by a pipeline to two service reservoirs, both in Leatherhead, which were used to supply water to Leatherhead, Ashtead, Mickleham, Fetcham, Great Bookham, Little Bookham, Stoke D'Abernon, Church Cobham and Street Cobham, now both part of Cobham. The act received royal assent on 31 May 1883. They also drew water from a borehole in Waterway Road, where the original buildings lasted until 1992, when they were demolished to make way for housing. Leatherhead became the next area to join East Surrey Water, when it was taken over under the East Surrey Water Act 1927 (17 & 18 Geo. 5. c. civ). The act extended East Surrey Water's area of supply to include all of the area then supplied by Leatherhead and District Water, and also included the village of Effingham. A large pumping station was built in the 1930s, next to the original Waterway Road works, which was equipped with diesel pumps to transfer the water to the new Elmer Works on Hawks Hill. Diesel engines were subsequently replaced by electric motors. Elmer Works is labelled a water softening works on the 1935 Ordnance Survey map. The source of water for the Leatherhead pumping station is still a series of ten artesian wells near the millpond at Fetcham.

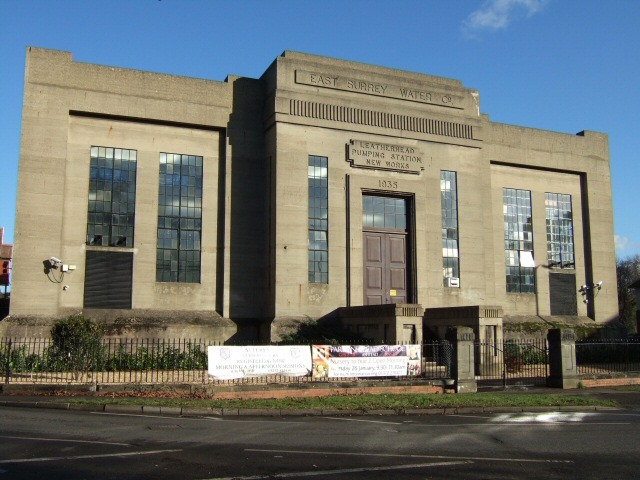
Leatherhead pumping station was built in the 1930s to pump water to Elmer Treatment Works

Limpsfield and Oxted Water Act 1888
- Act of Parliament
- Parliament of the United Kingdom
- Long title: An Act for dissolving the Limpsfield and Oxted Water Company (Limited) for re-incorporating the proprietors therein with others and for conferring powers on the Company so to be incorporated and for other purposes.
- Citation: 51 & 52 Vict. c. cvi

Dates
- Royal assent: 24 July 1888

Text of statute as originally enacted

Limpsfield and Oxted Water Act 1902
- Act of Parliament
- Parliament of the United Kingdom
- Long title: An Act to authorise the Limpsfield and Oxted Water Company to make additional waterworks to extend the limits of supply of the Company to raise additional capital to confer further powers upon the Company and for other purposes.
- Citation: 2 Edw. 7. c. xl

Dates
- Royal assent: 28 April 1902

East Surrey Water Act 1921
- Act of Parliament
- Parliament of the United Kingdom
- Long title: An Act to confer further powers on the East Surrey Water Company.
- Citation: 11 & 12 Geo. 5. c. xliii

Dates
- Royal assent: 28 July 1921

The Limpsfield and Oxted Water Company was formally established by the Limpsfield and Oxted Water Act 1888 (51 & 52 Vict. c. cvi), but was not the first company to supply water to that area, since the act gave powers to dissolve a limited company with the same name, and to incorporate the shareholders into a new company. The new company could supply water for public and private use to the villages of Limpsfield, Oxted, Titsey, Tatsfield, Edenbridge and parts of Westerham. They were empowered to build two new reservoirs (numbered 3 and 4), both located in Limpsfield, and several pipelines, and to purchase the land on which the existing works of the limited company were situated, which included two reservoirs (numbered 1 and 2), a pumping station, and a meter chamber, all of which were located in Limpsfield. The act received royal assent on 24 July 1888. The company petitioned for another act of Parliament, the Limpsfield and Oxted Water Act 1902 (2 Edw. 7. c. xl), to allow them to increase their share capital, to build another reservoir and a well or wells with an associated pumping station in Limpsfield, and to extend their area of supply to include Cowden in Kent. It was granted on 23 June 1902. The company had maintained their charges at the same level since incorporation in 1888, but applied for the East Surrey Water Act 1921 (11 & 12 Geo. 5. c. xliii) to increase charges by one third.

Chelsham and Woldingham Water (Temporary Increase of Charges) Order 1920
- Statutory Rules and Orders
- Parliament of the United Kingdom
- Citation: SR&O 1920/981

Dates
- Made: 23 June 1920
Other legislation
Made under	Statutory Undertakings (Temporary Increase of Charges) Act 1918

Chelsham and Woldingham Waterworks (Modification of Charges Order) 1923
- Statutory Rules and Orders
- Parliament of the United Kingdom
- Citation: SR&O 1923/863

Dates
- Made: 30 July 1923
Other legislation
Made under	Water Undertakings (Modifications of Charges) Act 1921

The origins of the Chelsham and Woldingham Water Company are a little more difficult to trace. In 1884 the Caterham Spring Water Company presented a bill which would give them powers to take over various water works which already existed or were in the process of construction in the parishes of Chelsham and Woldingham, and to dissolve the company which owned them once they had been taken over. However, the Chelsham and Woldingham Waterworks Company Limited were still independent in 1910, when they applied to the Board of Trade, using the provisions of the Gas and Water Works Facilities Act 1870 (33 & 34 Vict. c. 70), for an order to allow them to continue providing water to Chelsham, Woldingham, and parts of Limpsfield, Oxted and Titsey, excluding the area already serviced by Limpsfield and Oxted Water. At the time they operated a borehole and pumping station in Chelsham, together with a tank and covered reservoir in Woldingham. The Chelsham and Woldingham Water Order 1910, confirmed by the Water Orders Confirmation Act 1910 (10 Edw. 7 & 1 Geo. 5. c. xciv), stated that the supply of water did not have to be constant, and that there was no requirement to supply it at a pressure greater than could be obtained by gravitation. The company obtained the Chelsham and Woldingham Water (Temporary Increase of Charges) Order 1920 (SR&O 1920/981) to temporarily increase charges, but when a further order, the Chelsham and Woldingham Waterworks (Modification of Charges Order) 1923 (SR&O 1923/863), was obtained from the Ministry of Health, the charges were 6.6 per cent lower than the temporarily order allowed.

East Surrey Water Act 1930
- Act of Parliament
- Parliament of the United Kingdom
- Long title: An Act to provide for the transfer to the East Surrey Water Company of the undertakings of the Limpsfield and Oxted Water Company and the Chelsham and Woldingham Waterworks Company Limited to extend the area of supply of the East Surrey Water Company and authorise them to raise additional capital and for other purposes.
- Citation: 20 & 21 Geo. 5. c. lxi

Dates
- Royal assent: 4 June 1930

Text of statute as originally enacted

In 1929, East Surrey Water presented a bill to Parliament which would allow them to take over Chelsham and Woldingham Water and Limpsfield and Oxted Water. While the Limpsfield and Oxted Water Company was to be dissolved, they retained an option to alter the aims and objectives of the Chelsham and Woldingham Water Company, and for it to continue. The East Surrey Water Act 1930 (20 & 21 Geo. 5. c. lxi) extended their jurisdiction, enabling them to supply water to Chiddingstone, Hever, parts of Brasted and Penshurst, all in Kent, and Hartfield in Sussex. Following these takeovers, they had 250,000 customers, supplying them with around 6 million imperial gallons (27 Ml) of treated water per day.

Dorking has had a public water supply from 1738, when a waterworks was built by Resta Patching, a local Quaker. The works was close to Pipp Brook, accessible from Church Street, and drew water from a spring. Pumps were operated by the flow of the brook, but because the water had to be paid for, not all of the residents were happy. The spring became polluted in the mid-nineteenth century, and the works closed. There is a building on the site of the works, which contains part of one of the original pumps in its cellar, and carries a plaque stating "R P Waterworks erected 1738", but the building itself, which is Grade II listed, dates from the nineteenth century.

Dorking Water Act 1869
- Act of Parliament
- Parliament of the United Kingdom
- Long title: An Act for better supplying with Water the parish of Dorking in the county of Surrey.
- Citation: 32 & 33 Vict. c. cxxv

Dates
- Royal assent: 26 July 1869

Dorking Water Act 1900
- Act of Parliament
- Parliament of the United Kingdom
- Long title: An Act for empowering the Dorking Water Company to raise additional capital and for other purposes.
- Citation: 63 & 64 Vict. c. xxxix

Dates
- Royal assent: 25 June 1900

East Surrey Water Order 1958
- Statutory Instrument
- Parliament of the United Kingdom
- Citation: SI 1958/2060

The Dorking Water Company was formally established in 1869, following the passing of the Dorking Water Act 1869 (32 & 33 Vict. c. cxxv). They dug a 300-foot (91 m) well on Harrow Road East. A steam-driven pump was housed in a pumphouse, and pumped the water to a reservoir on Tower Hill. In 1902, a new pumping station was built on Station Road, and the old one was converted to housing in 1919. The second pumphouse was replaced by a new works with boreholes on Beech Close in 1939. The company was absorbed by East Surrey Water in 1959. The amalgamation was authorised by the East Surrey Water Order 1958 (SI 1958/2060), which came into effect on 1 January 1959. Dorking Water as a company was dissolved on 4 November 1960. Dorking museum have several documents relating to the early waterworks, including records connected with a sale of the waterworks, dating from 1848, sale of the public waterworks dating from 1850, seven maps of Dorking at 1:500 scale showing the network of water mains dating from 1868-1870, and a poster advertising the sale of machinery from the Old Waterworks dating from 1878. East Surrey Water built a new works on Beech Close in 1965, with pumping controlled by electric motors, and diesel generators to maintain operations during a power cut.

Ministry of Health Provisional Order Confirmation (East Surrey Water) Act 1935
- Act of Parliament
- Parliament of the United Kingdom
- Long title: An Act to confirm a Provisional Order of the Minister of Health relating to the East Surrey Water Company.
- Citation: 25 & 26 Geo. 5. c. lxx

Dates
- Royal assent: 2 August 1935

Text of statute as originally enacted

East Surrey Water Order 1963
- Statutory Instrument
- Parliament of the United Kingdom
- Citation: SI 1963/657
Other legislation
Made under	Water Act 1945

East Surrey Water Order 1987
- Statutory Instrument
- Parliament of the United Kingdom
- Citation: SI 1987/1434

Dates
- Made: 6 August 1987
- Commencement: 7 August 1987
Other legislation
Made under	Water Act 1945

Text of statute as originally enacted

In 1968, East Surrey Water finished building their only surface water reservoir, at Bough Beech. A dam, around 0.5 miles (0.80 km) long was built at its southern end, to create a reservoir which is about 1.25 miles (2.01 km) long. Five small streams flow through the area and into the reservoir, but this only accounts for one fifth of the water supply. The rest is pumped from the River Eden from an abstraction point at Chiddingstone, generally during the winter months. Some 50 acres (20 ha) at the northern end are set aside as a nature reserve, which is managed by the Kent Ornithological Society, while the southern end is used for fishing and sailing. Since 1999, the adjacent works has included a purpose-built education centre, which is used by large numbers of school children, and the educational programme has been awarded a Quality Badge by the Department for Education's learning outside the classroom scheme.

=== Sutton District Water ===
Sutton District Waterworks Act 1871
- Act of Parliament
- Parliament of the United Kingdom
- Long title: An Act for better supplying with water Sutton, Cheam, and other places in the county of Surrey.
- Citation: 34 & 35 Vict. c. xv

Dates
- Royal assent: 25 May 1871

Text of statute as originally enacted

Sutton District Waterworks Act 1887
- Act of Parliament
- Parliament of the United Kingdom
- Long title: An Act to authorise the Sutton District Water Company to raise further capital and for other purposes.
- Citation: 50 & 51 Vict. c. lxxxix

Dates
- Royal assent: 5 July 1887

Text of statute as originally enacted

In a quite separate development, the Sutton and Cheam Water Company was established in 1863, with offices on Carshalton Road. They built a reservoir where Ventnor Road meets Brighton Road, and laid a series of water mains within the parish of Sutton. They obtained the water from wells dug into the underlying chalk aquifer. In 1871, they promoted a bill to dissolve the company, and to re-incorporate it, either with the same or a different name. The new company would be responsible for supplying potable water to Banstead, Beddington, Carshalton, Cheam, Cuddington, Ewell, Morden, Sutton, Wallington and Woodmansterne. The principal works which they already owned were a well with a pumping station and other works in Sutton, a reservoir (designated number 1) in Sutton, a second reservoir (designated number 2) on Banstead common, pipework connecting the pumping station to reservoir 1, and pipework connecting reservoir 1 to reservoir 2. The Sutton District Waterworks Act 1871 (34 & 35 Vict. c. xv) empowered them to build reservoir number 3 at Banstead, to duplicate the pipework from the pumping station to reservoir 1, and to construct a new pipeline from reservoir 2 to reservoir 3. Among the miscellaneous provisions were the right to "break up and interfere with" streets, roads, lanes, bridges and other places, in order to install water mains. The company was renamed, becoming the Sutton District Water Company. They obtained a second act of Parliament, the Sutton District Waterworks Act 1887 (50 & 51 Vict. c. lxxxix), which allowed them to increase their capital by issuing more shares, and to supply water in bulk to various types of authorities and companies, which were not necessarily within their area of supply. In order to facilitate this, they were granted the same powers to lay water mains in private roads as they held for public roads, and there was specific provision for the supply of water meters.

Sutton District Waterworks Act 1903
- Act of Parliament
- Parliament of the United Kingdom
- Long title: An Act to authorise the Sutton District Water Company to construct additional waterworks acquire lands and raise further moneys and for other purposes.
- Citation: 3 Edw. 7. c. xviii

Dates
- Royal assent: 30 June 1903

Text of statute as originally enacted

Sutton District Waterworks Act 1906
- Act of Parliament
- Parliament of the United Kingdom
- Long title: An Act for the preservation of the sources of water supply of the Sutton District Water Company and for other purposes.
- Citation: 6 Edw. 7. c. clxxxviii

Dates
- Royal assent: 4 August 1906

Water Provisional Order Act 1910
- Act of Parliament
- Parliament of the United Kingdom
- Long title: An Act to confirm a Provisional Order made by the Board of Trade under the Gas and Water Works Facilities Act 1870 relating to Sutton District Waterworks.
- Citation: 10 Edw. 7 & 1 Geo. 5. c. xciii

Dates
- Royal assent: 3 August 1910
Other legislation
Relates to	Gas and Water Works Facilities Act 1870

Text of statute as originally enacted

Under the terms of the East Surrey Water Act 1896 (59 & 60 Vict. c. cxxvii), there was some interchange of areas of supply between the two companies, particularly in Banstead, Kingswood and Ewell. Two further acts were obtained; the Sutton District Waterworks Act 1903 (3 Edw. 7. c. xviii) and the Sutton District Waterworks Act 1906 (6 Edw. 7. c. clxxxviii), the latter prohibiting the abstraction of water by any other company within Sutton District Water's area of supply, for sale outside of that area. They next applied to the Board of Trade for the Sutton District Waterworks Order 1910, confirmed by the Water Provisional Order Act 1910 (10 Edw. 7 & 1 Geo. 5. c. xciii), which allowed them to extend their area of supply to include Kingswood. Specific mention was made of two existing pipelines supplying the area, and authorisation for the construction of a third, to a new water tower in Kingswood, was obtained. There was also a general provision to enable them to alter some or all of the provisions of the acts of Parliament they had obtained in 1871, 1887, 1903 and 1906. The water tower was built on Tower Road, Tadworth, and enabled them to supply Tadworth and the higher parts of Banstead. When it became surplus to requirements, the water tank was removed from the top and it was converted into a house.

Sutton District Waterworks Act 1915
- Act of Parliament
- Parliament of the United Kingdom
- Long title: An Act to authorise the Sutton District Water Company to raise further moneys and for other purposes.
- Citation: 5 & 6 Geo. 5. c. lvi

Dates
- Royal assent: 15 July 1915
Other legislation
Repealed by	Sutton District Water Company (Constitution and Regulation) Order 1989

Status: Repealed

Text of statute as originally enacted

Sutton District Waterworks Act 1921
- Act of Parliament
- Parliament of the United Kingdom
- Long title: An Act to authorize the Sutton District Water Company to construct additional waterworks and for other purposes.
- Citation: 11 & 12 Geo. 5. c. xxiv

Dates
- Royal assent: 1 July 1921

Sutton District Waterworks Act 1929
- Act of Parliament
- Parliament of the United Kingdom
- Long title: An Act to authorise the Sutton District Water Company to raise additional capital to confer further powers upon the Company and for other purposes.
- Citation: 20 & 21 Geo. 5. c. xxviii

Dates
- Royal assent: 26 July 1929

Another act of Parliament was obtained the Sutton District Waterworks Act 1915 (5 & 6 Geo. 5. c. lvi), and a Board of Trade order to temporarily increase charges for the water supplied was obtained – the Sutton District Water (Temporary Increase of Charges) Order 1919. They obtained a further act, the Sutton District Waterworks Act 1921 (11 & 12 Geo. 5. c. xxiv), which authorised the construction of wells and boreholes, together with a filtration plant and a softening plant on land they already owned in Cheam. From the works, a new pipeline led to a service reservoir on the east side of Cheam Warren. It included clauses to allow them to alter and vary the charges made, without the need for further sanction by Parliament, thus formalising the order of 1919, to raise additional capital, and to alter any of the provisions of all of the previous acts and orders which governed their operation. The main purpose of the Sutton District Waterworks Act 1929 (20 & 21 Geo. 5. c. xxviii) was to restructure the way in which the company was financed, and to allow them to raise additional capital. They also wanted to increase the amount of water they could abstract from the Cheam wells, by removing a provision of their 1921 act. Other changes included a provision to collect water rates in advance, to allow them to supply water to "caravans, shacks, huts, tents" and other similar structures, and to charge for water by volume when it was supplied to certain types of building.

Sutton District Water Company (Constitution and Regulation) Order 1989
- Statutory Instrument
- Parliament of the United Kingdom
- Citation: SI 1989/2379

Dates
- Made: 15 December 1989
- Laid before Parliament: 21 December 1989
- Commencement: 11 January 1990
Other legislation
Made under	Water Act 1989

Text of statute as originally enacted

By 1958, the company had three works, at Sutton, Cheam and Woodmansterne, all of which abstracted water from deep wells in the underlying chalk aquifer. The hard water was treated with lime to soften it before being pumped to the distribution network. Each pumping station had diesel and electric pumps, and Sutton works also still had backup steam engines for pumping.

=== Sutton and East Surrey Water ===
East Surrey Water and Sutton District Water merged in 1996 to become Sutton and East Surrey Water plc. It had its head office in Redhill, and moved into a new building on London Road on 2000. It is responsible for water supply to an area of 322 square miles (835 km^{2}), providing this service to a population of 655,000 and to some 17,000 businesses, including Gatwick Airport. It produces around 35 million imperial gallons (160 Ml) of treated water per day, which it delivers through 2,100 miles (3,400 km) of water mains. In order to achieve this, it maintains 31 operation service reservoirs and water towers, 23 pumping stations, eight treatment works, and has one surface reservoir, at Bough Beech, near Edenbridge, Kent. The treatment works are at Cheam, Elmer (near Leatherhead), Cliftons Lane in Reigate, Woodmansterne, Kenley, Godstone, Westwood (Clacket Lane, Tatsfield parish) and Bough Beech. In October 2021 consumers supplied by the Westwood treatment works (properties in and around Oxted) were warned to boil all drinking water because of contamination by E.coli.

Sutton and East Surrey Water are undertaking a series of major improvements, to ensure that all properties can be supplied with water from more than one works. This is being achieved in three stages, corresponding to the asset management plan (AMP) funding periods for UK water companies. Under AMP5, which covers 2010 to 2015, the capacity of Bough Beech works was increased from 45 Mld (megalitres per day) to 55 Mld, and two new trunk mains were installed. This increased the proportion of the area of supply connected to two works from 11 per cent to 36 per cent. This will be further increased to 56 per cent under AMP6, covering 2015 to 2020, by increasing the capacity of Woodmansterne works from 35 Mld to 50 Mld, upgrading Woodmansterne pumping station, and installing another four trunk mains. During AMP7, covering 2020 to 2025, they hope to have all customers supplied by more than one works, by a further upgrade to Bough Beech works, increasing its capacity from 55 Mld to 70 Mld, and installing the final two trunk mains.

=== Amalgamation timeline ===
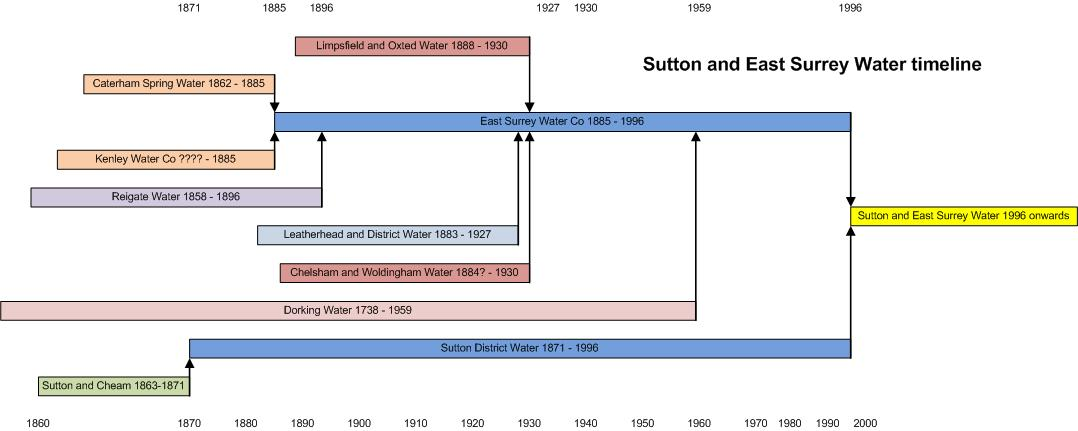

=== SES Water ===
Despite its business name remaining Sutton and East Surrey Water plc, the company began trading as SES Water in February 2017.

=== 2026 treatment works outage affecting Gatwick Airport ===
On 26 July 2026, a power outage at Bough Beech treatment works caused some customers in Kent and Surrey to experience loss of supply or low water pressure. The works began operating again later in the day, but it took longer for the network to fully recover. Both terminals of Gatwick Airport lost supply from 10am affecting toilets, causing the closure of restaurants and bars, and leading to flight delays. Gatwick Airport management stated that SES Water became aware of the water outage several hours before the airport, but they were not warned which would have enabling them to take contingency measures.

== Bibliography ==
- Evans, L D; Gledhill, E G B (1958). "Water Supply in the Borough" (PDF). Epson and Ewell History Explorer. Archived (PDF) from the original on 6 May 2016.
- Malden, H E, ed. (1911). A History of the County of Surrey. Victoria County History. Vol. 3. British History Online. Archived from the original on 17 June 2016.
- Museum (2012). "Catalogue of Series-R (records)" (PDF). Dorking Museum. Archived (PDF) from the original on 30 October 2015.
- SIHG (1999). Surrey's Industrial Past (PDF). Surrey Industrial History Group. ISBN 978-0-9523918-8-3. Archived (PDF) from the original on 19 October 2016.
- Sonden, Lester; Murphy, Alison (22 April 2016). "Resilience to Climate Change" (PDF). Consumer Council for Water (London and South East Committee). Archived (PDF) from the original on 21 October 2016.
- Stock Exchange (1990). Register of Defunct Companies 2nd Ed. Macmillan. ISBN 978-1-349-11273-9.
- Tarplee, Peter (2009). "Early Water, Gas and Electricity supplies in Surrey". Leatherhead Local History Society. Archived from the original on 14 September 2015.
