= List of Masters of Requests of England and Scotland =

The Master of Requests was a Great Officer of State in the kingdoms of England and Scotland.

== Masters of Requests (England) ==
In England the office was created in the 15th century and abolished in 1685. For main article, see Master of Requests (England).

Masters of Requests Ordinary

- 1471–1480: William Hatteclyffe
- 1514: Sir Thomas More
- 1540–1554: Sir Edward Carne
- 1550–1553: John Cock
- 1552–1553: John Lucas
- 1553–1558: John Throckmorton
- 1553–1558: Sir Thomas White
- 1558–?1587: Thomas Seckford (died 1587)
- 1558–1571: Walter Haddon
- 1571–1573: Thomas Wilson
- 1576–1589: Valentine Dale
- 1579–1581: Sir William Gerard
- 1582–1584: David Lewis
- 1585–1600: John Herbert
- 1586–1596: Ralph Rokeby
- 1590–?1595: William Aubrey (died 1595)
- 1596–1606: Julius Caesar
- 1600–1616: Roger Wilbraham
- 1617–1622: Sir Christopher Perkins
- 1608–1609: Sir Thomas Smith
- 1609–1614: Sir Ralph (or Roger) Winwood
- 1614–1616: Sir Richard Williamson
- 1616 - No of Masters of Requests increased from 2 to 4
- 1616–1640: Sidney Montagu
- 1616–1618: Sir Robert Naunton
- 1616–1619: Sir Lionel Cranfield
- 1618–1641: Sir Ralph Freeman
- 1619–1622: Sir John Suckling
- 1622–1641: Sir Edward Powell, 1st Baronet
- 1622–1625: John Coke
- 1625–1641: Sir Thomas Aylesbury, 1st Baronet
- 1640–1641: Robert Mason
- Appointed by King Charles I at Oxford
- 1643: Arthur Duck
- 1644–1645: Edmund Pierce
- Appointed by Oliver Cromwell
- 1657: Nathaniel Bacon (died 1660)
- Restoration of the Monarchy
- 1660–1664: Sir Richard Fanshawe, 1st Baronet
- 1660–1667: Sir Ralph Freeman (resworn, died 1667)
- 1660–1662: Robert Mason (resworn, died 1662)
- 1660–1675: Gervase Holles (died 1675)
- 1662–1675: Thomas Beverley (died 1675)
- 1664–1679: Sir John Birkenhead (died 1679)
- 1667–1685: Sir Charles Cotterell
- 1675–1685: William Glascock
- 1675–1685: Thomas Povey
- 1679–1681: William Fanshawe
- 1681–1685: Charles Morley
- 1685 Office abolished

Masters of Requests Extraordinary - partial list

- 1591–1596: Julius Caesar
- 1630–1640: Robert Mason
- 1660: Sir Edmund Pierce

== Masters of Requests (Scotland) ==
In Scotland the office first appeared in the reign of King James V. Its functions in Scotland differed from those of the offices in England and France and included the receiving of petitions from subjects and presenting them for consideration by the Scottish Privy Council. After 1603, the Scottish Master of Requests acted as an intermediary between the Council in Scotland and the King in England. Although not named as an Officer of State in 1579, he was "to have acces in the counsalehouse and be present in tyme of counsale". In 1592, however, he was included with the Secretary, the Lord Justice Clerk, the Lord Advocate and the Lord Clerk Register who "being ordinar officaris of the estait as also senatouris of the college of justice" could not attend council on a daily basis.

The Master of Requests sat in the Scottish Parliament as an officer of State from 1604 to 1633, but his office was not revived at the Restoration, its duties being taken over by the Secretary.

Masters of Requests Ordinary - partial list

- 1577-1606: Mark Kerr, 1st Earl of Lothian
- 1606: Robert Kerr, 2nd Earl of Lothian
- 1614: Sir William Alexander (died 1640)

== See also ==
- Master of Requests (France)
