= Betchworth =

Village and parish in Surrey, England

Coordinates: 51.233°N 0.266°W

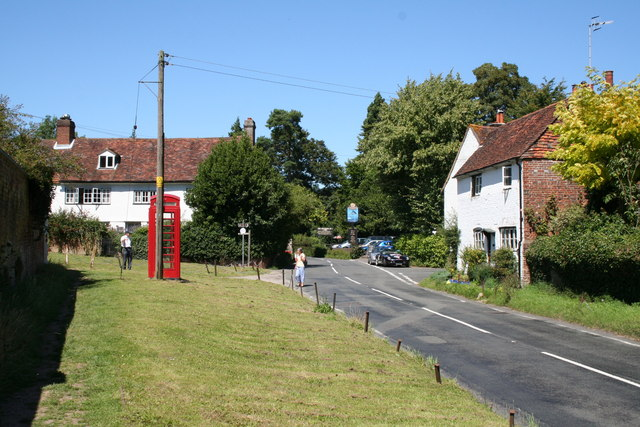
- The Street, Betchworth

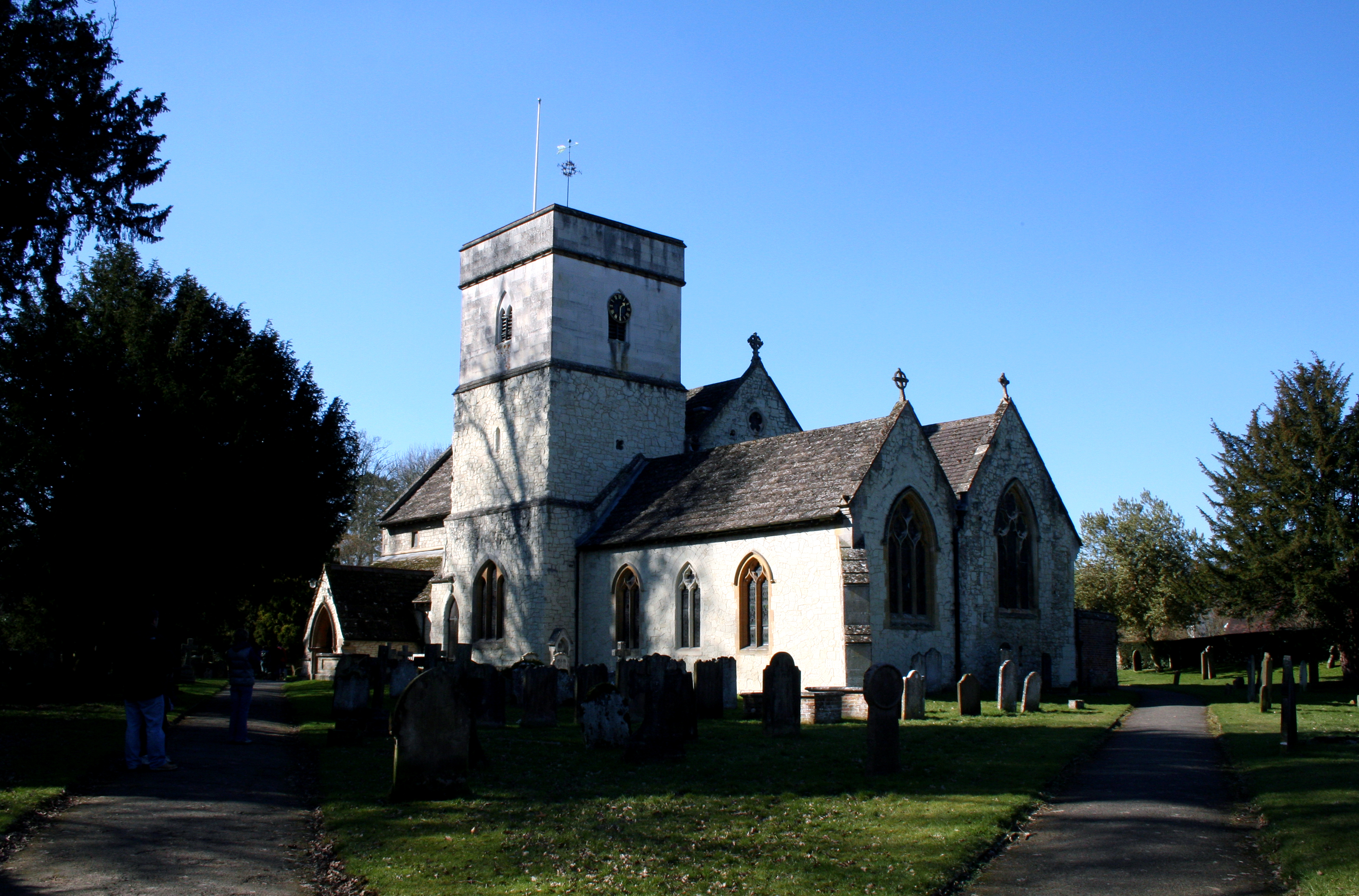
- The Grade I-listed St Michael's Church

- Location within Surrey
- Area: 9.91 km^{2} (3.83 sq mi)
- Population: 1,052 (Civil Parish 2011)
  - Density: 106/km^{2} (270/sq mi)
- OS grid reference: TQ2150
- Civil parish: Betchworth
- District: Mole Valley
- Shire county: Surrey
- Region: South East
- Country: England
- Sovereign state: United Kingdom
- Post town: BETCHWORTH
- Postcode district: RH3
- Dialling code: 01737
- Police: Surrey
- Fire: Surrey
- Ambulance: South East Coast
- UK Parliament: Dorking & Horley

Betchworth is a village and civil parish in the Mole Valley district of Surrey, England. The village centre is on the north bank of the River Mole and south of the A25 road, almost 3 miles (4.8 km) east of Dorking and 3 miles (4.8 km) west of Reigate. London is 19.5 miles (31.4 km) north of the village.

Service sector occupations dominate Betchworth's economy (Note: In 2001, 34.3% of the population worked in middle or higher professional occupations, see Economy) – its station and road links make it a part of the London commuter belt – combined with crop agriculture and services for a relatively large retired proportion of the population. A former lime quarry, rebuilt manor house and Grade I-listed church are within its boundaries.

== History ==
=== Toponymy ===
State records show the name as Becesworde (11th century), Beceswrde (12th century) and Bechesworth (13th century). The name is generally agreed to mean a "farm or enclosure belonging to a person or family called Becci".

=== Pre-Roman settlement ===
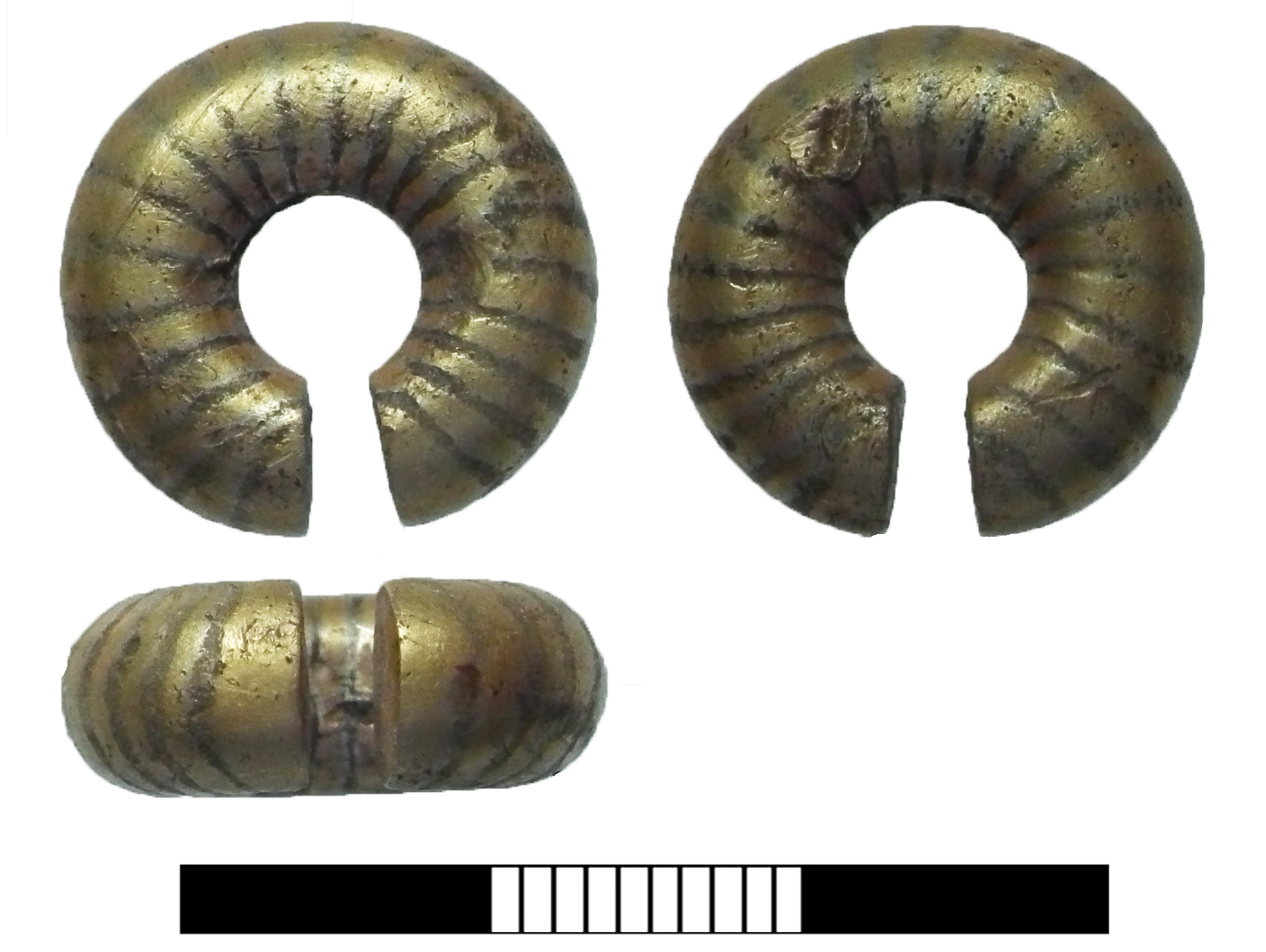
A gold, Bronze Age penannular ring, dating from c. 1150 – c. 800 BCE. It was found in Betchworth in 2014 and is now held by Dorking Museum.

Bronze Age artefacts have been found at Betchworth only since 1944. No Roman villas, farms or camps have been found.

=== Medieval period ===
Betchworth lay within the Wotton hundred and appears in two entries (Note: Malden states it is uncertain if the part with Thorncroft Manor is still in the parish or is part of Dorking Parish) in the Domesday Book of 1086 as Becesworde, held by Richard Fitz Gilbert, Richard de Tonebrige. In the Domesday survey its assets were: 27 villagers/smallholders, 15 slaves, two hides; one church, two mills worth £1 10 s, 12 ploughlands, 11 acres (4.5 ha) of meadow, pasture for five swine and woodland and herbage/woodland worth 81 hogs. To its overlords it rendered in total £7 10s. A distinct part named Thorncroft is mentioned in the first listing which was split by five overlords in 1066 before the conquest, Lewis (1848) and Malden (1911) say this relates to the formerly detached part in the west that is now between Brockham and Dorking.

Part of the village was reclassified in the 13th century. Subsequently, the east of the village became part of Reigate hundred. Ownership of Betchworth Manor passed to Hamelin de Warenne, Earl of Surrey, who did villein service on Friday's Mead as Lord of (among others) Reigate and Betchworth in 1279. Hamelin's grandson John de Warenne, 6th Earl of Surrey owned much land in Surrey and his widow left the land to his nephew the Earl of Arundel, who eventually left the manor to Lord Abergavenny. The 9th Lord Abergavenny sold it in 1629 for £1,080 to Sir Ralph Freeman (Note: Sir Ralph Freeman was a relatively minor civil judge who married into exclusive tin rights and became Auditor of the Royal Mint and Auditor of Imprests), in whose family's hands it remained until 1817 when it was sold to Henry Goulburn.

Two manors existed within the boundaries of today's village: Wonham, which still stands today, and Betchworth. A third manor, Brockham, became a separate village to the west.

Wonham Manor, a grade II listed building, forms the eastern corner of the parish and for centuries owned Wonham Mill at the foot of the Shag Brook, which is a tributary of the River Mole, on the boundary with Buckland.

=== Post-Reformation ===
A manorial system continued for a long period in this village; the great tithes were commuted for £295 15s 4d, and the vicarial (lesser tithes) for £20.

=== Post-Industrial Revolution ===
A school was endowed with £20 per annum as at 1848 four other significant endowment charities existed then and continued though were less significant due to inflation through to at least 1911 for the benefit of the poor.

=== Betchworth lime quarries ===
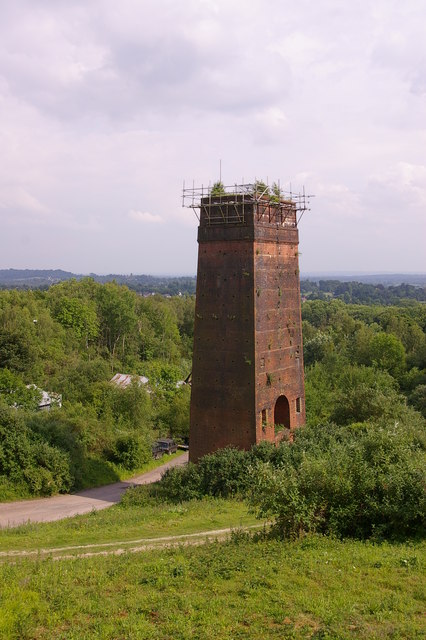
The Smidth Kiln at Betchworth Quarry was constructed in around 1901.

To supply the cement for construction associated with required brick built housing, a rich seam of suitable chalk and limestone was identified in the North Downs. Broome Park estate, extending to the top of the hill, included some of these quarries and was integral to the Dorking Grey Stone and Lime Company and the North Downs Line's spur lines leading to these three pits. After an Act authorising the railway from Reading to Reigate was passed in 1847 and its construction, opening in 1849 the Betchworth Quarry Railways were built. To calcinate the lime from the stone, lime kilns were required. The six of the lime kilns along the Pilgrims' Way footpath in Betchworth are Scheduled Ancient Monuments, including Hoffman, Dietz and Six Flare kilns. In 1911 A History of the County of Surrey by Malden which is also a county guide, records the earlier key dates in the industry and records that "the chalk furnishes the chief industry...There are also brickyards in the parish, which is, however, mostly agricultural and residential".

Accomplished surgeon to George IV, William IV and Queen Victoria, Sir Benjamin Collins Brodie, lived and died at Broome Park, (Note: Sir Benjamin Brodie "died on 21 October 1862 here") a nursing home since 1993 with 11 acres at the top end of The Street.

In 1924 a hydrator plant at Betchworth Limeworks was installed for slaking the lime.

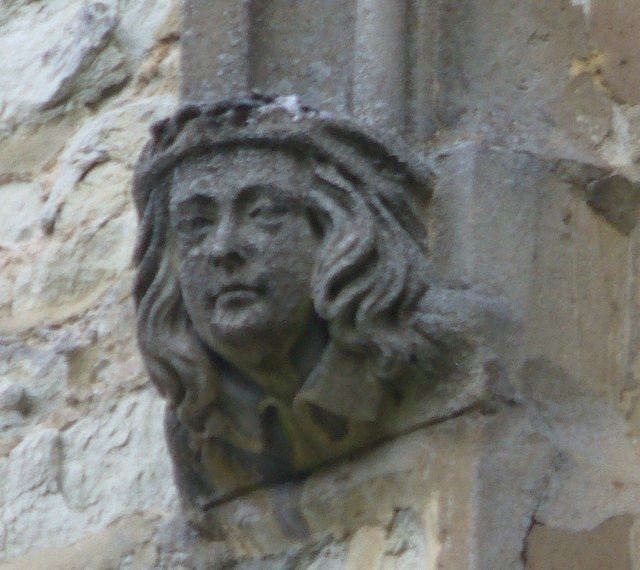
Carving, St Michael's Church, Betchworth

== Landmarks ==
Betchworth Conservation Area contains 22 listed buildings and the church of St Michael, the only Grade I building.

=== Betchworth Castle ===
The ruins of Betchworth Castle in Betchworth Park are a couple of miles west of Betchworth in the west of Brockham civil parish.

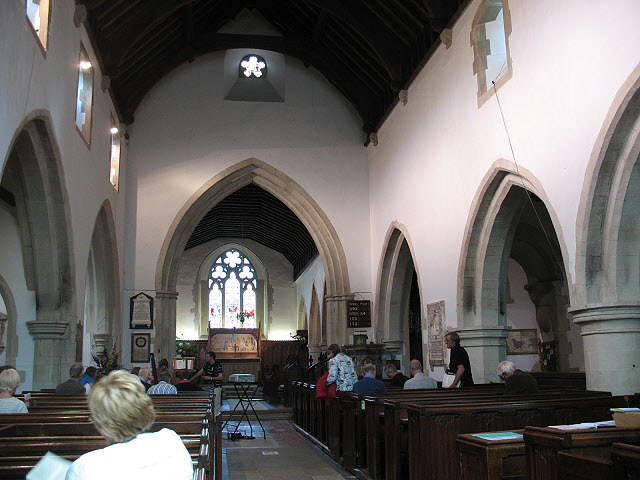
Gothic architecture Church interior at Betchworth

=== St Michael's Church ===
St Michael's Church, Betchworth is Church of England, immediately northwest of the village green and is Grade I listed. Most of the church on the Betchworth site now occupied by St Michael's dates to the early 13th century, and in a pillar of the tower's south window there remains a fragment of the stone Saxon church. The south aisle chapel became known as the Hope Chapel after Henry Thomas Hope bought the Manor in 1838.

A tall war memorial is outside of the main west entrance of the building. A particular fine example of medieval Gothic architecture pointed arches is in this church throughout its long nave and forming the entrance to its alcoves.

It was used for one of the first scenes of Richard Curtis's comedy film Four Weddings and a Funeral (1994). The village street was used for the first shot in David Lean's film Lawrence of Arabia (1962).

=== Betchworth House ===
Grade II*-listed Betchworth House is the largest building in the village, excluding Hartsfield Manor Hotel on the opposite bank of the Sloughs brook, and was built by the lord of the manor in 1675. It was erected by the Freeman local Lords of the Manor after Ralph Freeman, judge, auditor and tin trader bought the manor in 1629, which the House replaced. A painting now in the house shows its appearance then, with corner towers. It was extended and re-faced in 1808 and again 1820. The house is constructed of red brick covered in stucco, tiled roofs behind parapets, long slated roofs to the back forming eaves and features sash windows. Merstham stone (of the North Downs) forms its main entrance surround—a "Gibbs-style door surround with pulvinated frieze and rusticated, arched, surround". Half-oval balconies are to the first floor windows. Marble columns are in the rear room. By 1961 the house was in disrepair. It was reduced in scale and rationalised in the 1980s by architect Sir William Whitfield for James Hamilton, 4th Baron Hamilton of Dalzell and today has a late Regency appearance.

The stables in front of Betchworth House by the Street are separately listed.

Humphry Repton produced a Red Book for Betchworth in 1801, which is still held by the estate. Repton created long-distance views radiating from the Garden front of the house. A facsimile of the Betchworth Red Book has been published.

=== Broome Park ===
Broome Park is a Grade II listed early 19th-century house. It was the home of Sir Benjamin Brodie, the royal physician. After his death in 1862, it was sold to General Sir Percy R. B. Feilding, son of the 7th Earl of Denbigh, and was later the home of his daughter, Lady Louisa Feilding (d.1918). It is now a nursing home.

== Local Government ==
=== County ===
Betchworth falls within the county of Surrey which is responsible for education, almost all built infrastructure and other services such as social care.

Surrey County Council is elected every four years and has one representative, from Dorking Rural ward. In 2021 Helyn Clack, (Con) was elected.

=== District ===
Betchworth is in the east of Mole Valley District Council area, in which the main town is Dorking. Three councillors sit on Mole Valley District Council, who are:

Election	Member	Ward
2023	Simon Budd	Brockham, Betchworth, Buckland Box Hill & Headley
2023	Paula Keay	Brockham, Betchworth, Buckland Box Hill & Headley
2010	Paul Potter	Brockham, Betchworth, Buckland Box Hill & Headley

=== Parish ===
At the local level Betchworth Parish Council provides certain local facilities and services.

== Parliamentary Constituency ==
Betchworth is within Dorking and Horley parliamentary constituency.

== Geography ==
=== Location ===
Betchworth is 3 miles (4.8 km) east of Dorking and 3 miles (4.8 km) west of Reigate. The village is 20 miles (32 km) south of London, in the outer London commuter belt.

=== Elevation ===
Elevations range from 216 m at the water tower, which marks the highest point of the parish on Box Hill, down to the River Mole, which runs east–west through the village at 43 m AOD. Between these extremes the landscape is mainly undulating, except for the steep (and where quarried for several hundred metres, sheer) chalk face of the North Downs.

=== Geology & Soil ===
Formation of the North Downs and the erosion that has taken place widely with repeated sea inundations and deposition is described in detail in the Geology of Surrey. Mammoth fossilised bone remains have been found below flint beds under considerable clay in the low hills by the bank of the River Mole in Betchworth.

Most of the parish has free draining slightly acid loamy soil. Soil of the area that forms the top of the Betchworth Hills (Note: Betchworth Hills, likewise to the Brockham Hills, describe particular steep southern slopes of Box Hill) is "free draining, slightly acid but base-rich soil" rather than "shallow, lime-rich soil over chalk or limestone" which dominates the middle of Box Hill. This is the natural spur to the trees that line the top as it produces extremely fertile pastures and deciduous woodland. Surrey Wildlife Trust manages the rare flower meadows beneath the old quarry.

The land rises towards the North Downs AONB. Below this range of hills the Mole flows briefly along the Vale of Holmesdale and the area around its tributary the Gadbrook is within the village.

=== Demography & Housing ===
In 2001 Betchworth comprised 372 households and 12 vacant houses, shops and country businesses such as stone merchants and garden centres.

In the 2001 census, Betchworth had 919 residents, of whom 26.5% were aged over 65; 4.8% of the population were in full-time further education; 74.5% of all men were economically active whereas 2.5% were unemployed and 4.2% worked part-time; 56.1% of all women were economically active whereas 1.6% were unemployed and 35.1% worked part-time.

In the 2001 census 98.5% of the population identified as white, 0.7% as mixed and 1.3% as one of the four other main categories (five including mixed).

In 2001 74.7% of the population identified themselves as Christian, 0.7% as Muslim, 1.4% other religions, 13.4% as atheist. 10.5% declined to state a religious affiliation.

Betchworth's economy is predominantly a service sector economy reflected by the low concentration at one end of the official categorisation table of occupation given, compiled from the 2001 census:

Category	Number of adults in category in 2001	Percentage of those aged 16–74
Lower supervisory and technical occupations	19	2.9%
Semi-routine occupations	42	6.5%
Routine occupations	23	3.6%

Whereas 34.3% of the population worked in middle or higher professional occupations.

2011 Census Homes
Output area	Detached	Semi-detached	Terraced	Flats and apartments	Caravans/temporary/mobile homes	shared between households
(Civil Parish)	176	124	71	48	7	0

The average level of accommodation in the region composed of detached houses was 28%, the average that was apartments was 22.6%.

2011 Census Key Statistics
Output area	Population	Households	% Owned outright	% Owned with a loan	hectares
(Civil Parish)	1,052	426	38.5%	30.8%	991

The proportion of households in the civil parish who owned their home outright compares to the regional average of 35.1%. The proportion who owned their home with a loan compares to the regional average of 32.5%. The remaining percent is made up of rented dwellings (plus a negligible percentage of households living rent-free).

=== Economy ===
Betchworth's economy is predominantly a service sector economy. With its rail station and road links it forms part of the London commuter belt. Cleaning and gardening companies find a strong local market. Crop, chicken and pasture agriculture as well as a relatively large retired proportion of the population. The former lime quarry is managed by workers from Surrey Wildlife Trust and English Heritage.

Great Brockhamhurst Farm is one of eleven farms in Betchworth and produces cereals and breeds horses. Root Hill farm is a farm and missionary camp. Local businesses include an air filters company. Yellow Pages: Westbury Filters, Betchworth and kennels.

Hartsfield Manor Hotel is a major local employer with a long entrance drive off Sandy Lane has 16 acres (6.5 ha) of parkland containing a small gatehouse called Ye Olde Gatehouse and serves also as a Wedding and conference venue.

Betchworth Park Golf Club holding in its grounds the ruined Betchworth castle is in Brockham though keeps the historic association with Betchworth.

== Culture & Community ==
=== Memorial Hall ===
Betchworth Memorial Hall is a large village hall with a stage and seating for 150 people; it leads to a smaller community room, the Geoffrey Browne Room, for 40/50 people. There is a kitchen which can serve either hall. All are available for hire.

=== Hamilton Room ===
An Archives/Meeting Room, The Hamilton Room, suitable for meetings of 30/40 people, and small parties with adjoining kitchen and all amenities, is situated in conservation area Church Street in the centre of the village. Within it is a room housing village archives, known as the Meg Ryan Room.

=== Public house ===
The public house in Betchworth is The Dolphin which is near the church and opposite the blacksmith. It has flagstone floors, log fires and a large rear garden.

=== Village Green ===
Goulburn Green, the alternative name for the Village Green has stalls and maypole dancing in the children-costumed May bank holiday Medieval Fayre, hosts occasional summer celebrations and is the venue of the Harvest Lunch in alternate years. James Hamilton donated the Green.

=== Allotments ===
Betchworth parish council operates six full size allotments at the rear of The Walled Garden allocated at a nominal fee.

=== Post Office ===
A Post Office with banking facilities is on Old Reigate Road, to the north of the village.

=== Local Walks ===
A popular local pastime is walking because in the Vale of Holmesdale and elsewhere.

== Transport ==
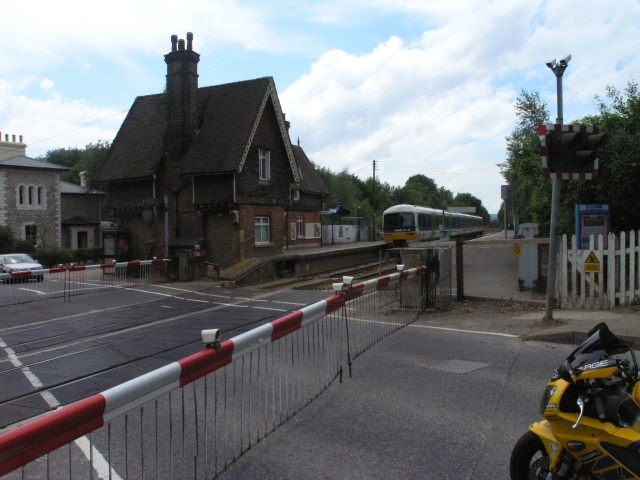
Betchworth Station

=== Railways ===
Trains call at Betchworth station at approximately hourly intervals in each direction in the morning and evening peaks and at two-hourly intervals off-peak. The route is known as the North Downs Line and runs between the stations of Reading and Gatwick Airport. Other stations along this route include Dorking (Deepdene), Guildford, Reigate and Redhill.

=== Roads ===
The A25 road that runs from the county of Kent to Guildford via Reigate and Dorking skirts the north of the village centre. From its roundabout on the A25, less major roads provide a cut-through towards Walton-on-the-Hill, via the notoriously steep Pebble Hill, a route towards Sutton, London, the M25's Reigate Hill junction or Leatherhead and minor routes to the south connect southern villages, including Leigh, Surrey. A-road intersections of the A25 are in Dorking (A24) and at the foot of Reigate Hill in Reigate (A217).

== Notable people ==
- Sir Ralph Freeman (abt 1590–1650)
- Sidonie Goossens, harpist, lived at Woodstock Farm, Gadbrook Road, Betchworth from 1949 until her death, aged 105, in December 2004.
- Henry Goulburn, Chancellor of the Exchequer (1828) and slave owner at his Jamaican estate, Amity Hall
- John Hamilton, 3rd Baron Hamilton
- Lord James Hamilton (1938–2006) Lord-in-waiting to the Queen
- Henry Hare, 3rd Baron Coleraine (1693–1749)
- Norton-Griffiths Baronets, Baronetcy of Wonham (1922)

== Education ==
North Downs Primary School is state-paid and has one of its three sites in the village.

== Notes and references ==
Notes
