= Bough Beech =

Hamlet in Kent, England

Coordinates: 51.201200°N 0.129320°E

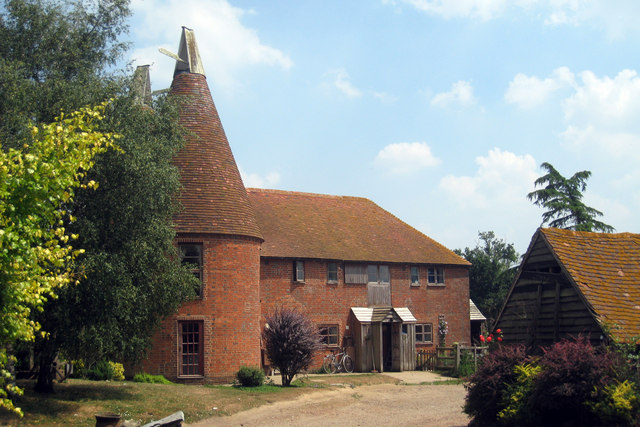
- Becketts Oasts, Tonbridge Road, Bough Beech

- Location within Kent
- District: Sevenoaks
- Shire county: Kent
- Region: South East
- Country: England
- Sovereign state: United Kingdom
- Post town: Edenbridge
- Postcode district: TN8
- Police: Kent
- Fire: Kent
- Ambulance: South East Coast
- UK Parliament: Tonbridge

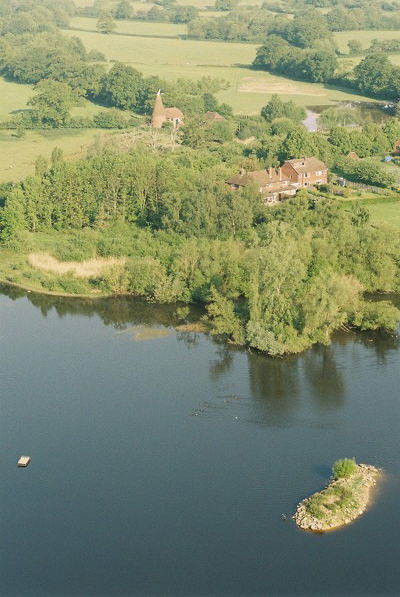
Over Bough Beech Reservoir

Bough Beech is a hamlet in the county of Kent, England, and is south of the Bough Beech Reservoir. It is located approximately three miles (5 km) east of Edenbridge (of which it is part) and five miles (8 km) south west of Sevenoaks. It is in the civil parish of Chiddingstone.

The reservoir is owned by the SES Water Company, who supply tap water to settlements west of the reservoir; including Gatwick Airport in West Sussex and Morden in south London. The reservoir is a nature reserve, in particular for bird watching; it is especially important for migrating osprey, though they are a rare sight now the reservoir is no longer stocked with trout.

The hamlet of Bough Beech is close to the Redhill to Tonbridge Line and has a pub, 'The Wheatsheaf'.

== Climate ==
Climate data for Bough Beech (1991–2020)
| Month | Jan | Feb | Mar | Apr | May | Jun | Jul | Aug | Sep | Oct | Nov | Dec | Year |
|---|---|---|---|---|---|---|---|---|---|---|---|---|---|
| Mean daily maximum °C (°F) | 8.1 (46.6) | 8.6 (47.5) | 11.3 (52.3) | 14.3 (57.7) | 17.4 (63.3) | 20.4 (68.7) | 22.7 (72.9) | 22.5 (72.5) | 19.5 (67.1) | 15.4 (59.7) | 11.4 (52.5) | 8.6 (47.5) | 15.1 (59.2) |
| Mean daily minimum °C (°F) | 1.2 (34.2) | 1.0 (33.8) | 2.5 (36.5) | 3.9 (39.0) | 6.9 (44.4) | 9.7 (49.5) | 11.9 (53.4) | 11.6 (52.9) | 9.1 (48.4) | 6.5 (43.7) | 3.5 (38.3) | 1.6 (34.9) | 5.8 (42.4) |
| Average rainfall mm (inches) | 78.4 (3.09) | 54.3 (2.14) | 44.7 (1.76) | 46.8 (1.84) | 50.6 (1.99) | 48.3 (1.90) | 48.5 (1.91) | 56.6 (2.23) | 52.7 (2.07) | 80.2 (3.16) | 86.0 (3.39) | 83.2 (3.28) | 730.7 (28.77) |
| Average rainy days (≥ 1 mm) | 12.3 | 10.3 | 8.8 | 8.8 | 8.3 | 8.3 | 7.5 | 8.1 | 8.4 | 11.6 | 13.0 | 12.2 | 117.9 |
| Mean monthly sunshine hours | 47.1 | 75.2 | 115.9 | 170.8 | 208.5 | 209.3 | 224.9 | 202.1 | 153.0 | 110.1 | 59.3 | 52.8 | 1,629.5 |
Source: Met Office
