= Betchworth railway station =

Railway station in Surrey, England

Coordinates: 51°14′53″N 0°16′01″W

Betchworth
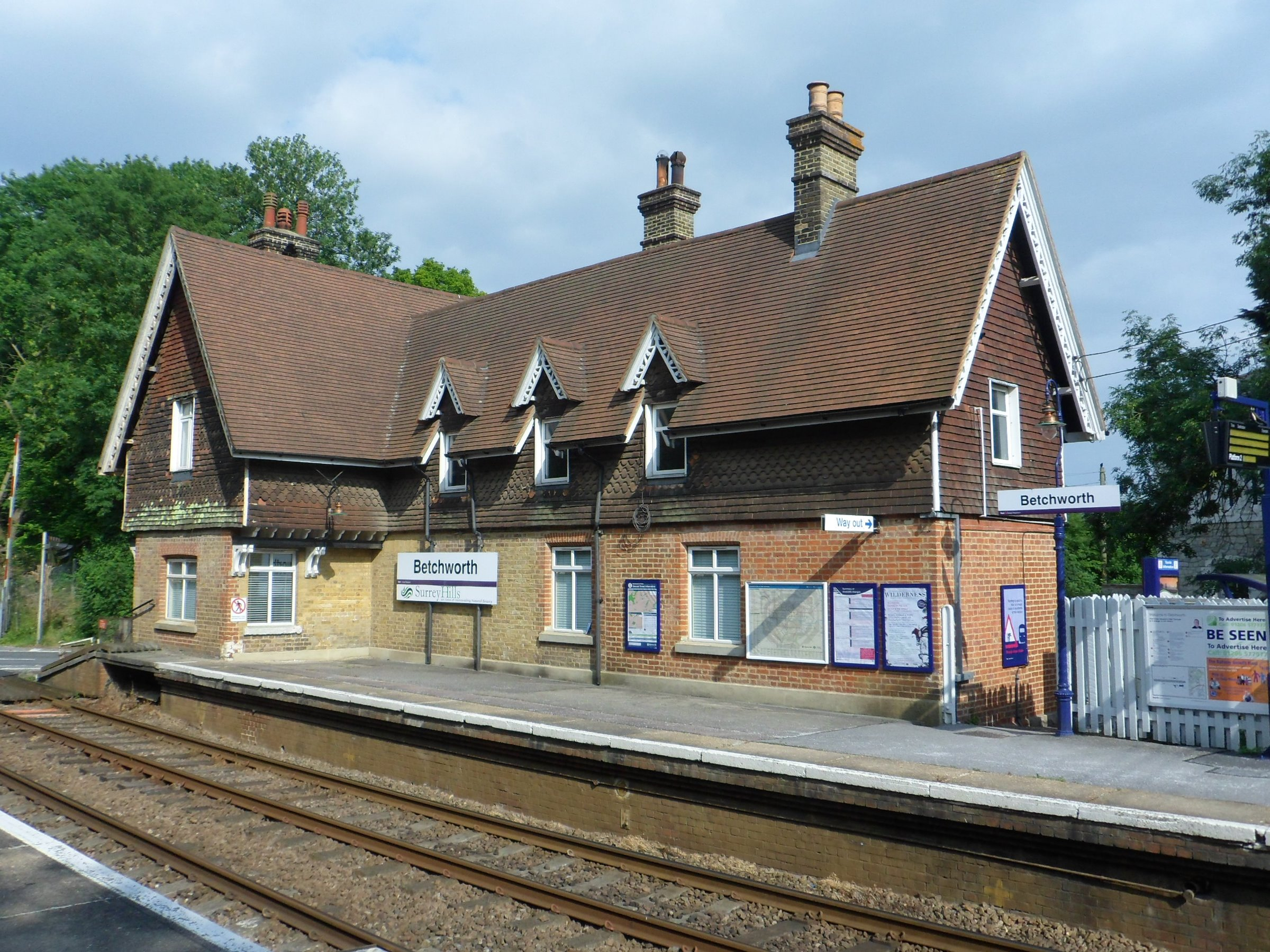

General information
- Location: Betchworth, Mole Valley; England
- Grid reference: TQ210512
- Manager: Great Western Railway
- Platforms: 2

Other information
- Station code: BTO
- Classification: DfT category F2

History
- Opened: 4 July 1849
- Original company: Reading, Guildford and Reigate Railway
- Pre-grouping: South Eastern Railway
- Post-grouping: Southern Railway

Passengers
- 2021/22: ▲12,152
- 2022/23: ▲12,368
- 2023/24: ▼10,460
- 2024/25: ▲14,482
- 2025/26: ▲20,282
Location
Notes
- Passenger statistics from the Office of Rail and Road

Betchworth railway station serves the village of Betchworth in Surrey, England. It is on the North Downs Line, 27 miles 17 chains (27.21 miles, 43.79 km) measured from London Charing Cross via Redhill. All services are operated by Great Western Railway.

== History ==
The station was opened in 1849 by the Reading, Guildford and Reigate Railway, which became part of the South Eastern Railway in 1852. It is 27 miles 17 chains (43.8 km) from Charing Cross, and has two platforms. The eastbound platform 1 is long enough for a four-coach train, but the westbound platform 2 can accommodate seven coaches.

The station was destaffed in 1967. In 1967, Quentin Crisp starred in the sixteen-minute film The Even Tenour of her Ways, which was shot at this railway station.

In 2017/18 and 2018/19, it was the least used station in Surrey, after patronage at Longcross increased.

== Services ==
All services at Betchworth are operated by Great Western Railway using Class 165 and 166 DMUs.

The typical off-peak service is one train every two hours in each direction between Reading via Guildford and Gatwick Airport. During the peak hours, the service is increased to one train per hour in each direction.

On Sundays, eastbound services at the station run only as far as Redhill.

Preceding station	National Rail	Following station
Reigate	Great Western Railway North Downs Line	Dorking Deepdene

== Betchworth Quarry Railways ==
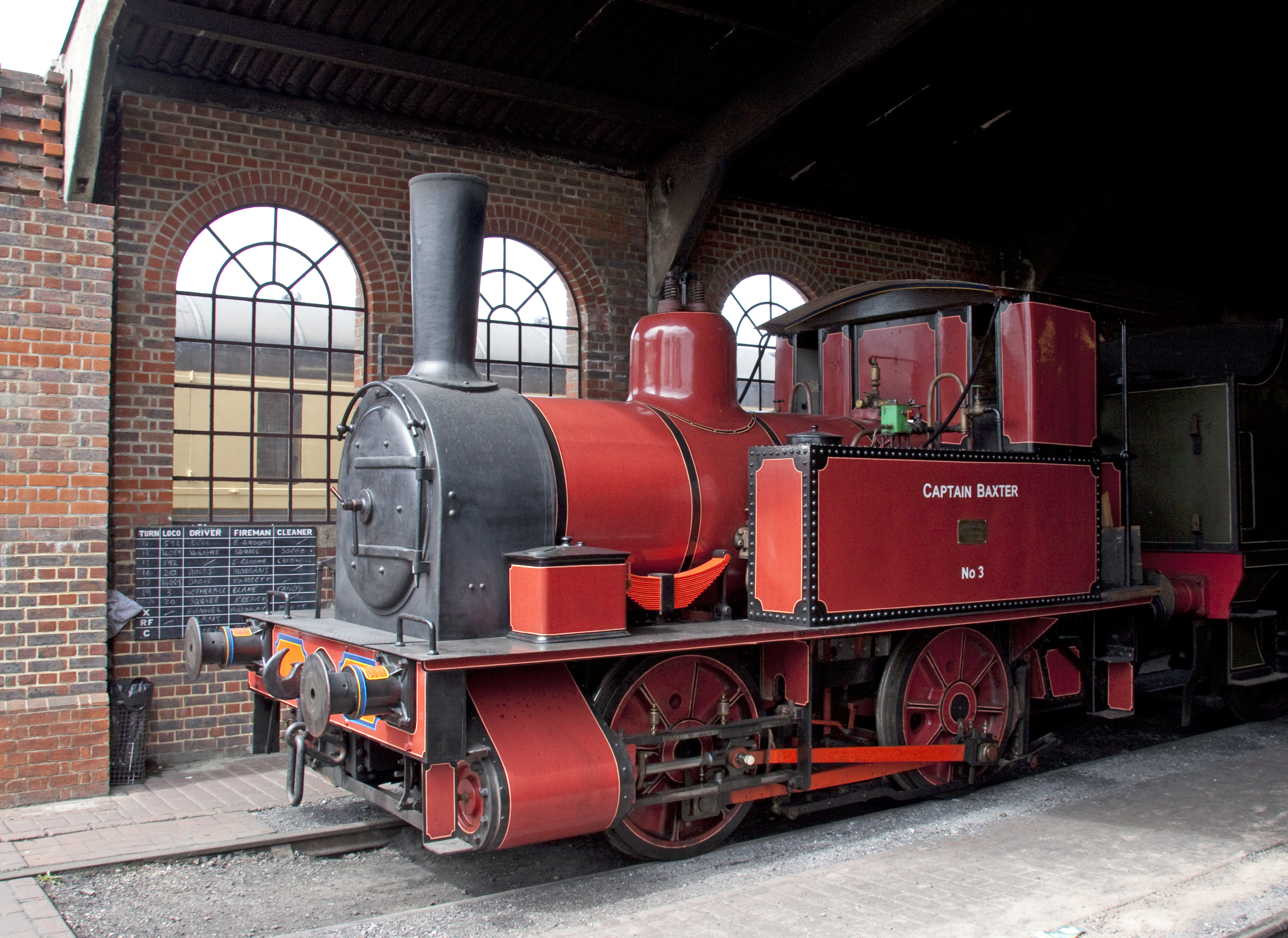
Captain Baxter at the Bluebell Railway

The station was particularly significant for its connection with the Betchworth Quarry railways, which were built to serve the Dorking Greystone Lime Company's three pits north of the station.

The quarry railways had four different track gauges. The standard gauge part had a junction with the main line to the west of Betchworth station It ran via a reversing siding to the Eastern and Southern Kiln Batteries. A 3 ft 2 1/4 in (972 mm) gauge railway system began there and primarily served the quarry with lines diverging to the Main, Upper Western Whitestone and Eastern Greystone Pits. The other gauges serving the works were the 19 in (483 mm) gauge line that ran from a standard gauge siding to the Hearthstone Mine, and a short 2 ft (610 mm) gauge section of track that ran exclusively between the Eastern and Southern Kiln Batteries.

The first engine to shunt on the standard gauge portion, Engine No. 1 of 1871, was unofficially named The Coffeepot. It is now preserved at Beamish Museum in County Durham. Another, Captain Baxter was renamed simply Baxter in 1947, the last engine ever to work the line, and the Rev. W.V. Awdry featured it in his book Stepney the "Bluebell" Engine. Baxter is preserved on the Bluebell Railway and was returned to traffic for that railway's 50th anniversary.

Two 3 ft 2 1/4 in (972 mm) gauge locomotives were also preserved. Townsend Hook, is at Amberley Chalk Pits Museum, having undergone a cosmtic restoration as a static exhibit. William Finlay, the sister engine of Townsend Hook, is preserved at the Narrow Gauge Railway Museum.
