= Pixham =

Village in Surrey, England

Coordinates: 51.2407°N 0.31957°W

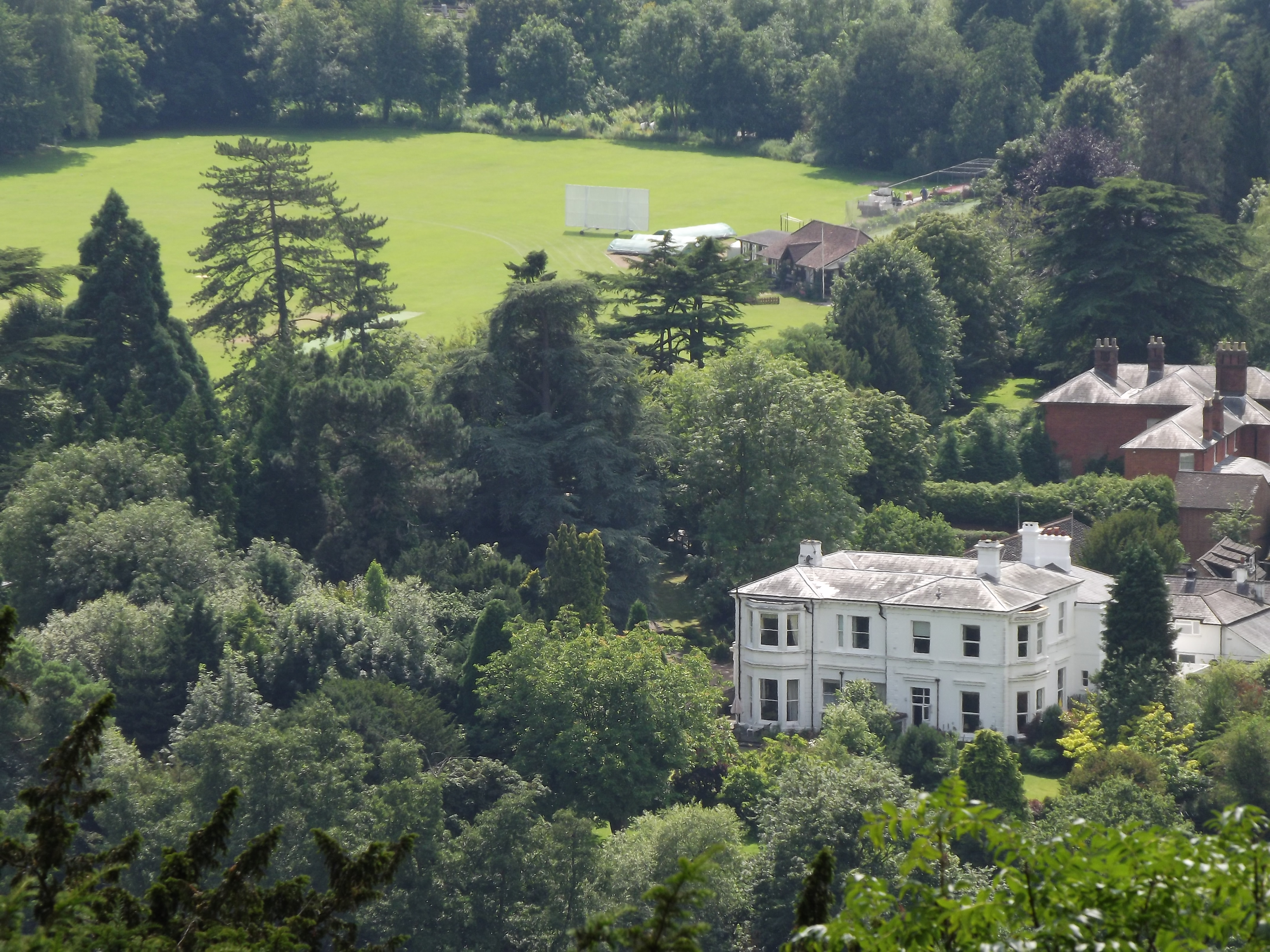
- Part of Pixham from Box Hill

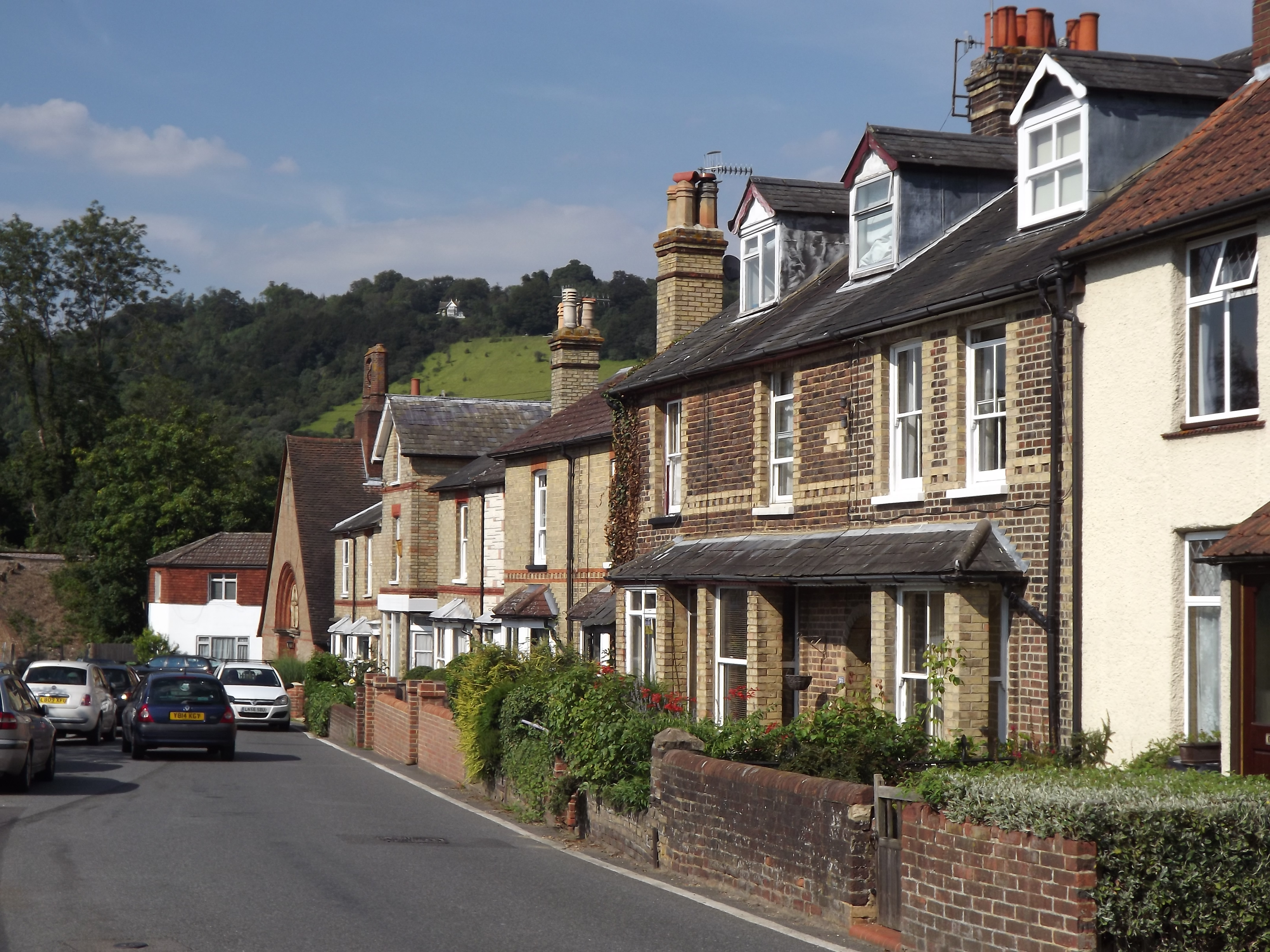
- Pixham Lane in the foreground bisects the village lengthways. Background: lower slopes of Box Hill

- Location within Surrey
- Population: 761
- OS grid reference: TQ174504
- District: Mole Valley
- Shire county: Surrey
- Region: South East
- Country: England
- Sovereign state: United Kingdom
- Post town: Dorking
- Postcode district: RH4
- Dialling code: 01306
- Police: Surrey
- Fire: Surrey
- Ambulance: South East Coast
- UK Parliament: Dorking and Horley

Pixham is a chapelry (small village) within the parish of Dorking, Surrey on the near side of the confluence of the River Mole and the Pipp Brook to its town, Dorking, which is centred 1 km (0.6 mi) southwest. The town as a whole, uniquely in Surrey, has three railway stations; Pixham adjoins or is the location of two of the three; and is near the junction of the A24 and A25 main roads.

Until 1910 watermills principally for corn grinding and for fulling at Pixham Mill operated, however its agricultural land has been converted to other use. At the 2011 census the main land use was residential land; its main business being the head office of Friends Provident (which has since been taken over by Aviva), small employers include a school, large inn and a waste water treatment works. Pixham (Note: Including approximately 50 hectares (120 acres) of Martha's Vineyard) covers 117 hectares (290 acres).

== Geography ==
The village is at the steep foot of the Box Hill stretch of the North Downs, on gently facing slopes leading up to the town of Dorking itself. To the east is the confluence of the River Mole and the Pipp Brook, to the west is the Mole Valley railway line. Elevations on the south border of the village reach 60m above sea level (15m higher than the average river level, which descends three metres through the village).

== History ==
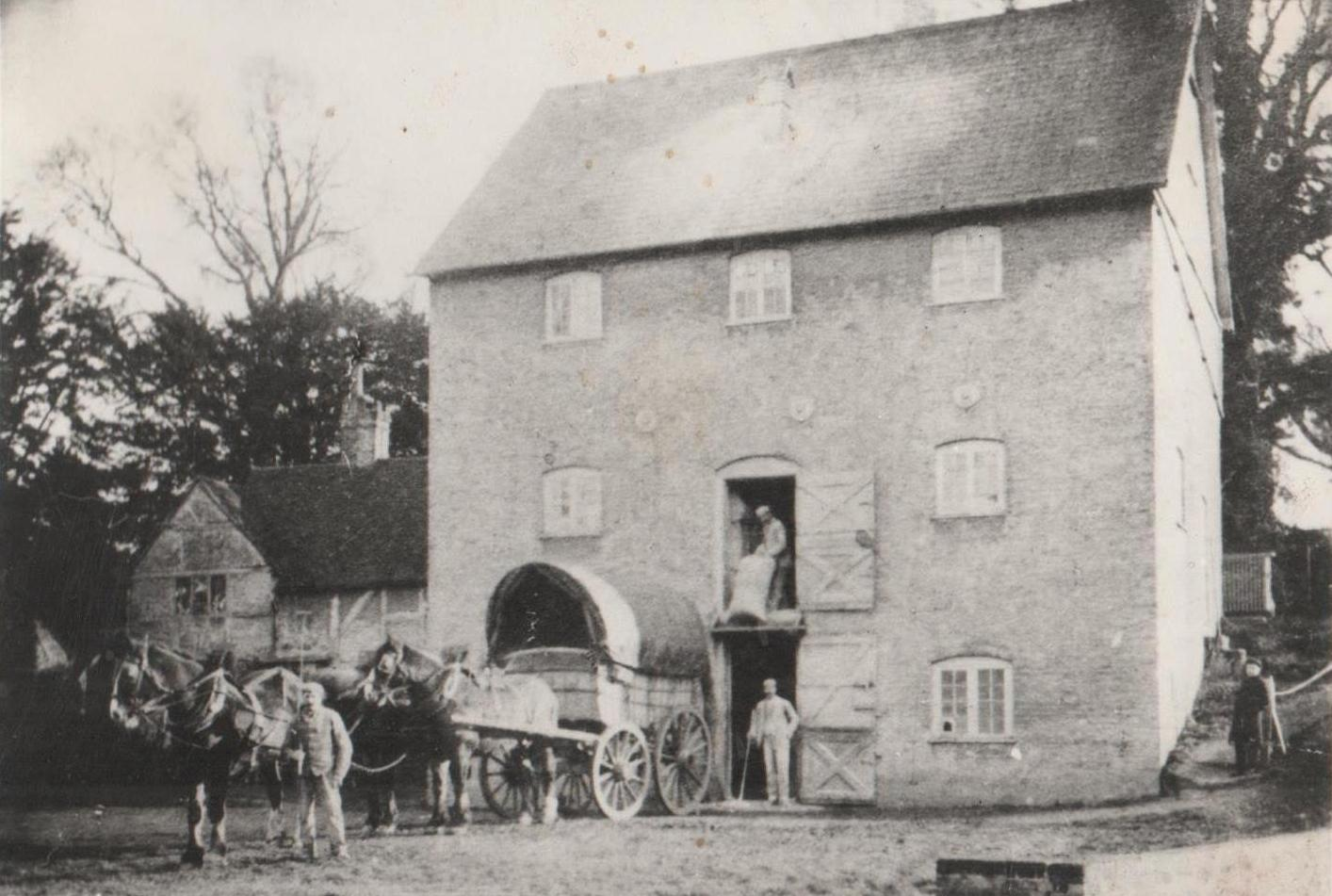
Pixham Mill when in use (c. 1890)

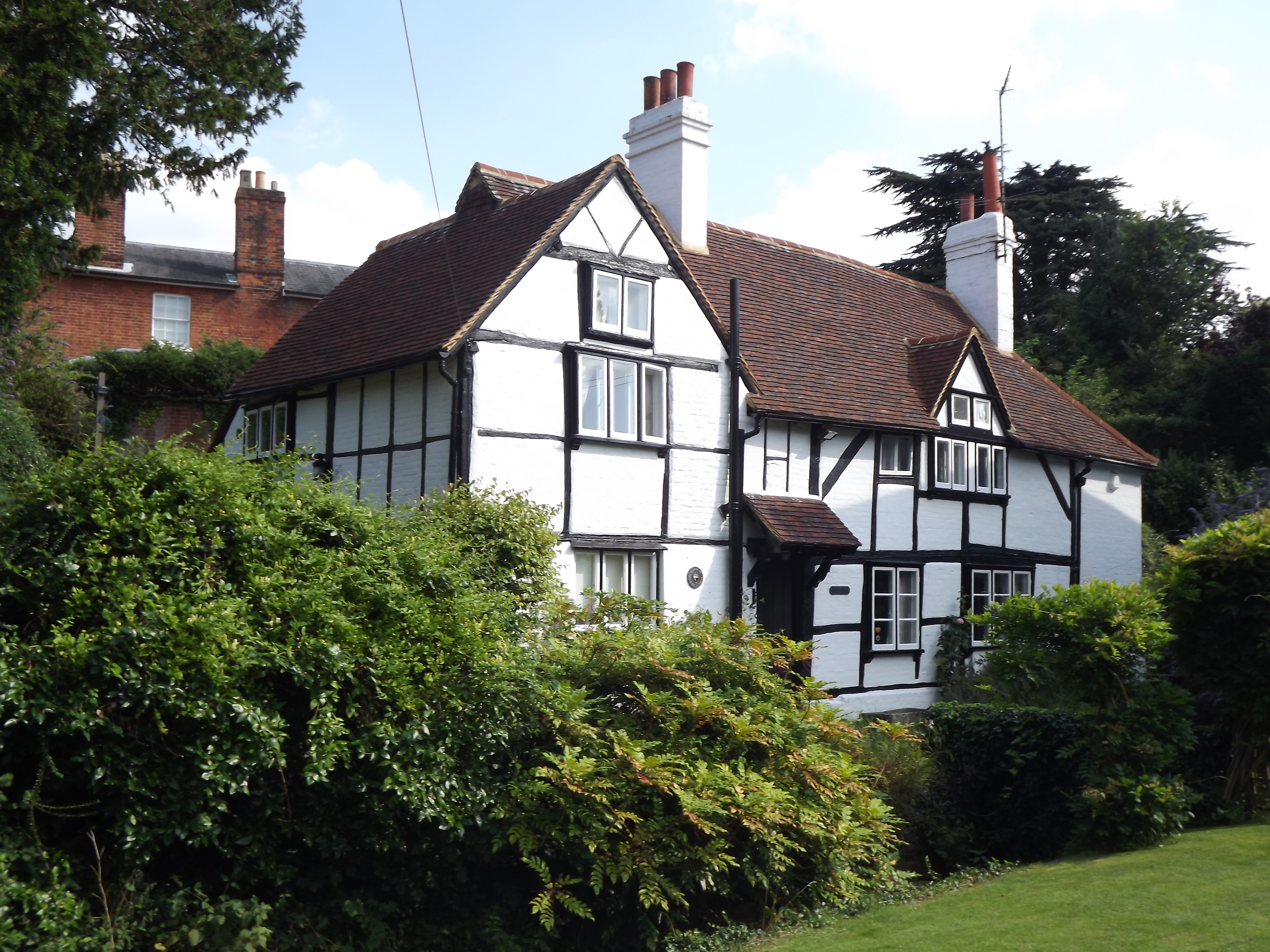
17th Century Pixham Mill Cottage

No mention is made of Pixham in Domesday Book, but evidence of Roman occupation, including coins, tiles and pottery shards, was discovered on the site of the Friends Provident Sports Ground in 1980; the adjoining road is part of the original line of one of the (Roman) Stane Streets in England. The first reference to Pixham despite centuries of recorded Rolls at Westminster (Note: See Assize Rolls, Patent Rolls and Feet of Fines) comes from a Manor Court Roll of 1417, as a farmed locality with mills but it never gained its own manor.

Giles Green which is no longer visible, north of the Pixham End building by the A24 London Road had the Cock Inn and the Dorking Tollgate with a milestone. A gravel pit for a few years existed in the 20th century on the Friends Provident playing fields here.

At Reverend James Fisher's boarding school in Pixham Daniel Defoe was a pupil. In 1910 watermills for corn grinding at Pixham Mill came to an end.

== Economy ==
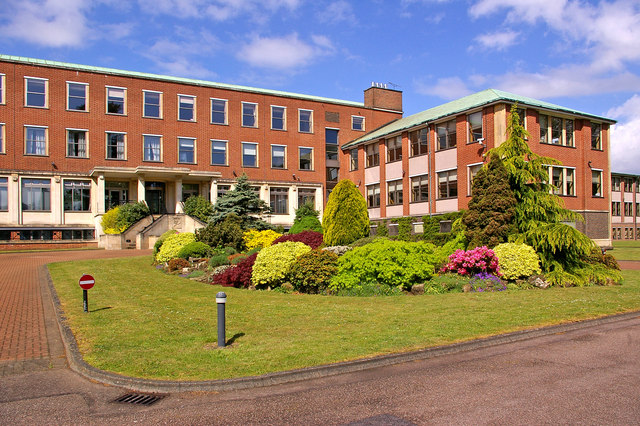
Pixham End offices

Friends Provident at Pixham End, built in 1957, is the largest employer in Dorking with its insurance, pensions and financial planning UK Head Office in this buffered locality of Dorking. The main land use is residential, the other large businesses being Betchworth Park Golf Course and The Watermill Inn directly to the south and a waste water treatment works on the eastern boundary.

== Demography ==
The 2011 United Kingdom census considered the village as three output areas, at which time overwhelmingly with gardens, 361 homes formed the village.

The proportion of households in the three divisions of Pixham who owned their home outright was in two of these 15% and 22% above the national average respectively, and slightly greater than the district average. The proportion who owned their home with a loan was in each output area within 2% of the borough and national average. This provides in each area for a lower proportion than average of rented residential property and of social housing relative to the Surrey and national averages.

2011 Census Key Statistics
Output area	Population	Households	% Owned outright	% Owned with a loan	hectares
E00155849 (Pixham centre)	227	128	45.3	32.0	12
E00155848 (Pixham north and Martha's Vineyard))	229	117	52.1	33.3	84
E00155531 (Pixham south and Boxhill Bridge)	305	116	32.8	50.9	23

== Landmarks ==
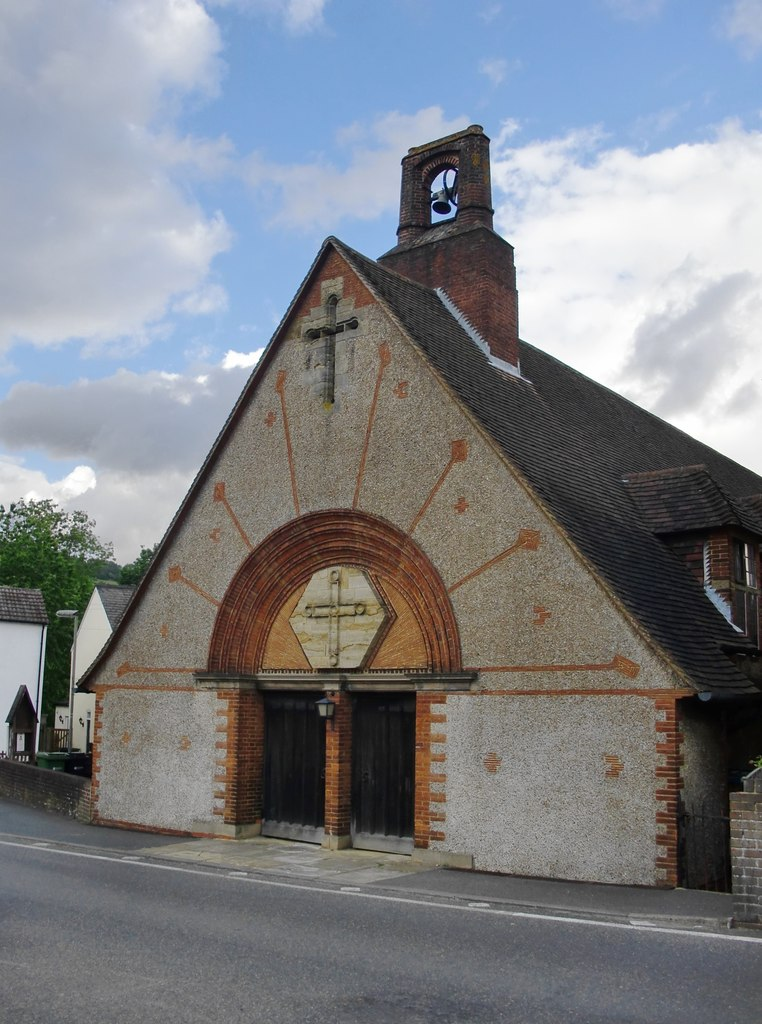
St Mary's Church, designed by Edwin Lutyens

Church

The church of St Mary, a chapel of ease to Dorking parish church has a barrel-vaulted ceiling; is in the centre and was designed by the architect Sir Edwin Lutyens in 1903. Due purely to its architecture not its age is ranked above the other three listed buildings in the village in the mid-category rather than starting level category at Grade II*. Non-eucharist services for the whole community take place on the majority of Sundays at this church.

Pixham Mill

The present plain three-storey brick building dates from 1837 replacing an earlier one. The machinery was driven by a 13 ft diameter overshot wheel. The mill was operated by an Attlee family (who also ran Parsonage Mill) from 1882 until milling ceased in 1910. The machinery was removed in 1937 for use in a Sussex mill. During World War II Moss Bros. used the building as a warehouse. It is now a private house, but the water channels remain. The house and the adjacent cottage were flooded three feet deep at Christmas 2013.

Pixham Mill Cottage

Two centuries older than the adjacent listed house named after Pixham Mill here by having been built in the first half of the 17th century, this timber-framed cottage with painted brick infill is Grade II listed and the oldest home in the settlement.

Old Castle Mill

This four-storey red brick, early 19th century mill has some of its machinery intact, however appears to have been defunct by 1912 and is a private house.

Primary School

This is the main amenity in the village. It is supported by the mother church to St Mary's Chapel in the village, St Martin's, Dorking and is a Church of England primary school with playing fields.

== Transport ==
Roads

The only through road in the village is Pixham Lane, which has a traffic-light controlled tunnel near the middle of the village. The village is bounded to the west by the A24, a dual carriageway after Junction 9 of the M25 (4 miles (6.4 km) north) as far as Horsham, West Sussex where there is then an interchange for Crawley or Brighton, which are linked by the M23. The narrower A25 road passes through the far south of the locality.

In east–west routes the south of the village adjoins the A25 which makes Dorking itself and the Reigate-Redhill conurbation accessible, and features in the London-Surrey cycle classic routes.

Railways

Dorking Deepdene station in Pixham has trains between Reading, Berkshire and Gatwick Airport, see the North Downs Line. This was the second station opened in the town however not under its current name but as 'Box Hill and Leatherhead Road'.

Dorking railway station is 0.5 km west of Pixham and has trains between Horsham and London Waterloo stations, see the Sutton and Mole Valley Lines; the line marks the western boundary in general use.

== Local government ==
At Surrey County Council, one of the 81 representatives represents the area within the Dorking Hills division.

At Mole Valley District Council. Pixham is in the portion of wards considered more rural than suburban so smaller and represented under the constitution by one councillor.

Mole Valley District Councillor
Election	Member	Ward
2015	Cllr Duncan Campbell Irvine	Mickleham, Westhumble & Pixham
2013	Cllr Roger Hurst	Mickleham, Westhumble & Pixham

Surrey County Councillor
Election	Member	Electoral Division
2013	Hazel Watson	Dorking Hills

== Notes and references ==
Notes
