= Hartsfield Manor =

Early Victorian house in Surrey, England

Coordinates: 51.23743°N 0.2642°W

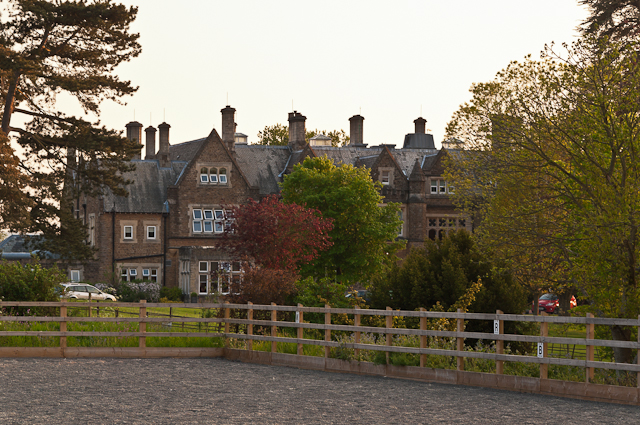

Hartsfield Manor is an early Victorian house of historical significance located in Betchworth, Surrey, England. It was built in the 1860s as a private residence and served this purpose for several notable people until World War II. After this it became a hotel and then a training centre. It is now a venue for special events such as conferences and weddings.

== Early residents ==
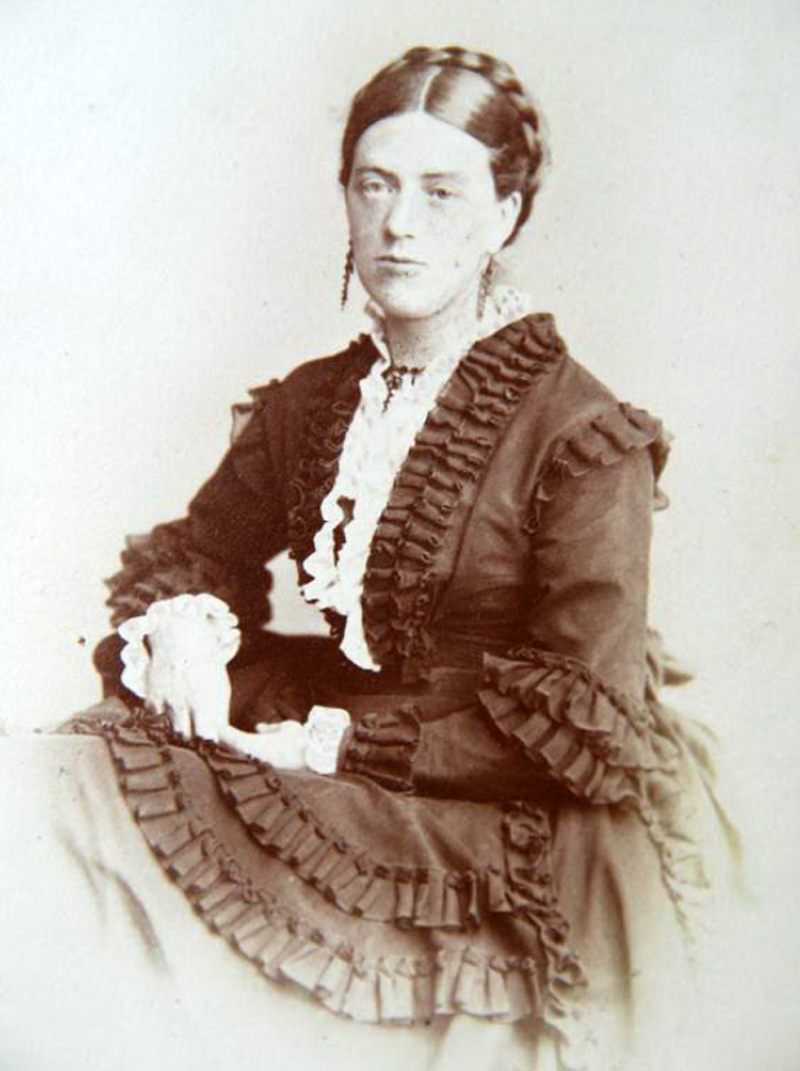
Mary Twynam Jaffrey, wife of Arthur Woodriff Jaffray and later wife of Captain George Gordon Moir

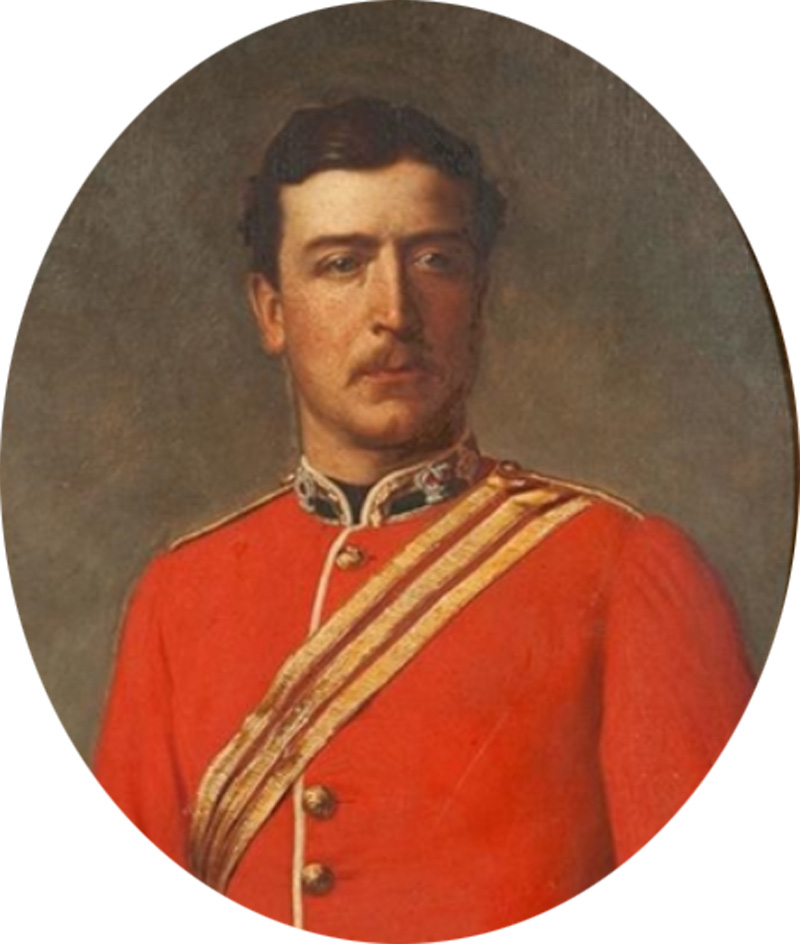
Captain George Gordon Moir

Arthur Woodriff Jaffray (1822–1864) built Hartsfield Manor in the 1860s. Arthur was born in 1822 in Hampshire. He was the son of John Richmond Jaffray a merchant who owned an import export business which operated in England and America. Arthur joined his father's firm and became quite wealthy. In 1858 at the age of 36 he married his cousin Mary Twynam Woodriff (1841–1885) who was nineteen years his junior. The couple lived for some time with Arthur's father who had rented Betchworth House and in the 1860s the building of Hartsfield Manor commenced. Unfortunately in 1864 Arthur had a hunting accident. He was shot in the hand and after the bullet was removed the wound became infected and he subsequently died. Mary who was pregnant was left a widow with their three children Lilian, Edward and Mary.

Mary and the children continued to live at Betchworth with the help of her younger brother John Woodriff. In 1871 she married Captain James Gordon Moir (1842–1903) whose portrait is shown. James was born in 1842 in India. His father was George Gordon Moir, a Scottish landowner who lived in India. He joined the 19th Foot (the Green Howards) and served there until his marriage in 1871.

By this time the building of Hartsfield Manor was complete and the couple moved there with Mary's three children. They had six more children over the next decade who were all born at the Manor. In 1883 the couple sold the house and moved to The Manor House, Colley. Unfortunately in 1885 at the age of only 44 Mary died of pneumonia at their new residence.

== Later occupants ==
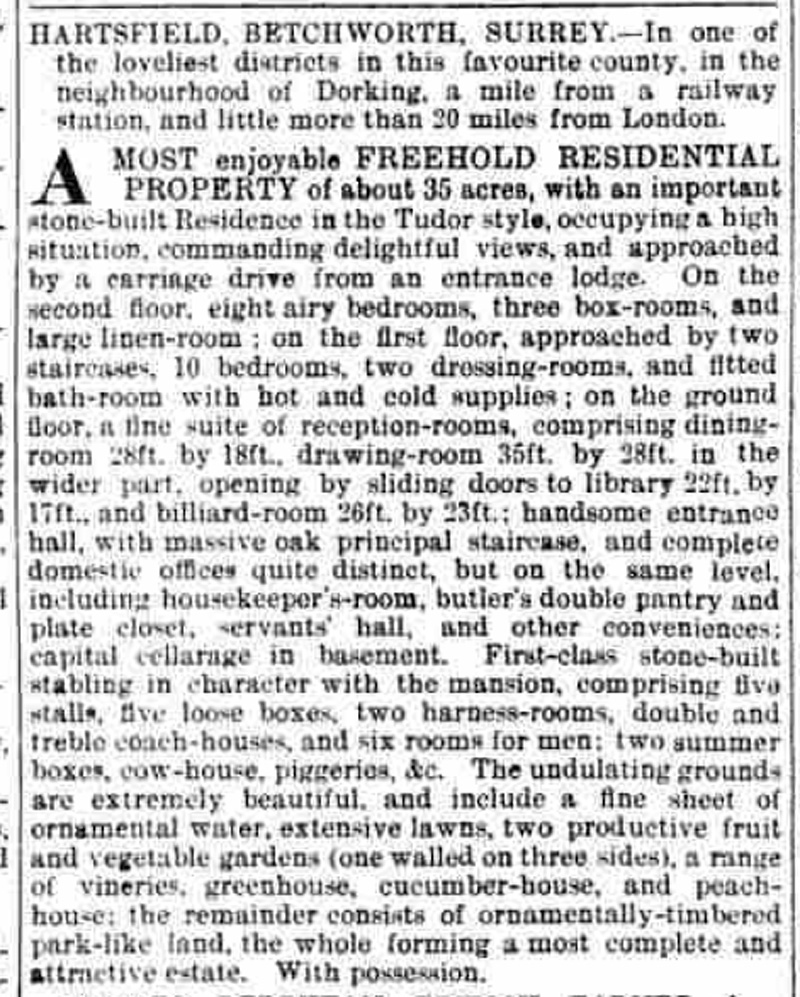
Sale notice of Hartsfield Manor in 1893

The next owner was Edward Miller (1829–1885). He was born in Ireland in 1829. His father was the Reverend George Miller (1764–1848) a famous Irish clergyman who wrote numerous historical and theological books. Edward became an East Indies merchant and in 1861 married Maria Olivia Darley (1840–1917) who was the daughter of a prominent Irish barrister William Frederick Darley Q. C. For many years they lived in Tolmers House in Hatfield. In 1885 two years after they had moved to Hartsfield Manor Edward died at the age of 65. Maria lived there for some years. In 1888 she held a large tea party of over 250 people at the house which was described in the newspaper. The property was placed on the market for sale in 1893 and was bought by the Higford family.

It was purchased by Mr Higford Higford (1840–1906) who was born Higford Burr but later assumed the surname of Higford in 1860. His father was Daniel Higford Duvall Burr, a landowner who built Aldermaston Court in Berkshire. His mother was Anne Margaretta Scobell who was a notable watercolour painter. In 1869 Highford married Julia Charlotte Reeves (1841–1929) and the couple had five daughters. When his father died in 1885 Higford inherited Aldermaston Court and sold it in 1893 to buy Hartsfield Manor. He died in 1906 leaving a large fortune. Julia his wife continued to live at Hartsfield Manor. The 1911 Census shows that she is living alone with a cook, a kitchen maid, two housemaids, a ladies maid, a butler and a footman. She died in 1929 and the house was placed on the market for sale.

The next resident was Major William Hewlins Milburn and his wife who were probably renting the property for a few years as their country house as they usually lived in London. In 1934 John Alexander Lloyd (1869–1939) bought Hartsfield Manor. John was born in 1869. He joined the old established family firm of Messrs A Lloyd and Sons who manufactured sheet metal products and eventually became a senior partner. In 1907 he married Hilda Mary Walker and the couple had three sons and two daughters. In 1920 he bought Broom Park in Betchworth and retained ownership of this property after his purchase of Hartsfield Manor. He lived with his family at Hartsfield Manor until his death in 1939. After the war the house became a private hotel and then a Midland Bank training centre. It was run by De Vere Venues as a place for special events such as conferences and weddings but is now owned and operated by CQK Limited as a Hotel still providing conferences & weddings. In 2019 CQK Limited rebranded their hotel business and are now known as the Manor Collection.
