= Bough Beech Reservoir =

Reservoir in Kent, England

Coordinates: 51.225°N 0.141°E

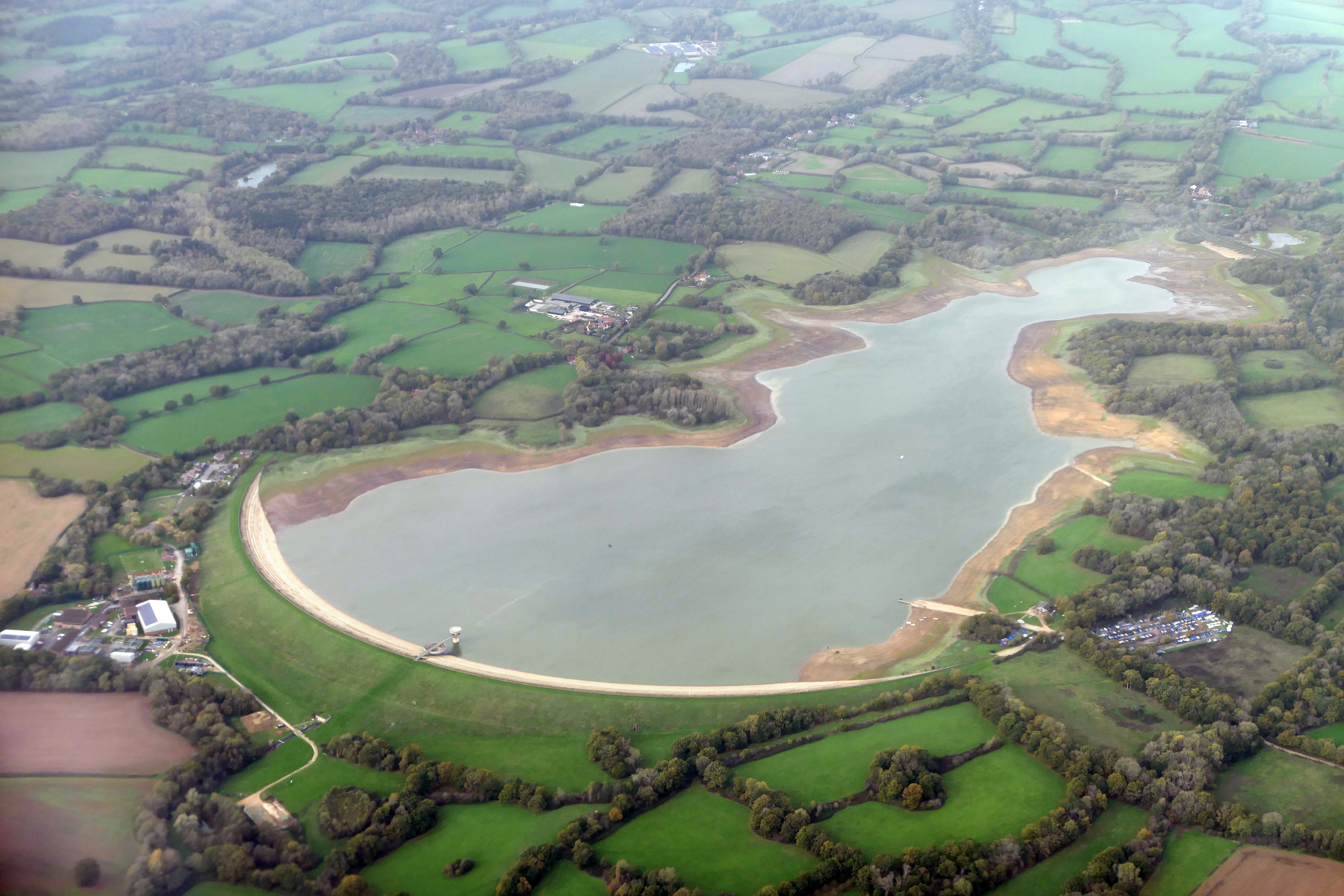
- Interactive map of Bough Beech Reservoir
- Type: Nature reserve
- Location: Bough Beech, Kent
- OS grid: TQ495494
- Area: 42 hectares (100 acres)
- Manager: Sutton and East Surrey Water

Bough Beech Reservoir is a 42-hectare (100-acre) nature reserve in Bough Beech, south-west of Sevenoaks in Kent. It was managed by the Kent Wildlife Trust until July 2020. It is in the Kent Downs Area of Outstanding Natural Beauty.

This nature reserve covers the northern end of Bough Beech reservoir, and there is a hide for viewing the many species of birds. The shores have great crested newts, toads and dragonflies.

There is public access to the site.
