= Pipp Brook =

River in Surrey, England

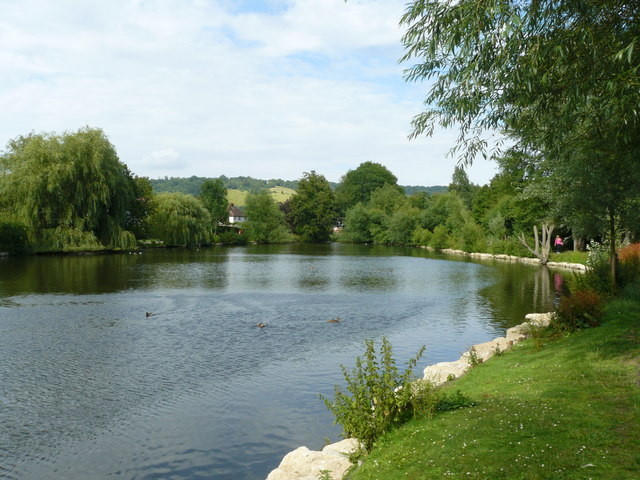
- Pipp Brook Mill Pond, Dorking

Location
- Country: England
- County: Surrey
- District: Mole Valley

Physical characteristics
- Source: Mag's Well
  - location: Leith Hill, Surrey
  - coordinates: 51.1975°N 0.3628°W
  - elevation: 219 m (719 ft)
- Mouth: River Mole
  - location: Pixham
  - coordinates: 51.2443°N 0.3189°W
  - elevation: 43 m (141 ft)
- Length: 9.5 km (5.9 mi)

Basin features
- Tributaries
  - right: Milton Brook

The Pipp Brook is a left-bank tributary of the River Mole, Surrey, England. It rises at two main springs north of Leith Hill on the Greensand Ridge, then descends steeply in a northward direction, before flowing eastwards along the Vale of Holmesdale. It runs to the north of Dorking High Street, before discharging into the Mole at Pixham.

The Milton Brook, which rises at a tri-forked source lower than that of the Pipp Brook, is the principal tributary.

== Course ==
=== Sources ===
- SW of Waterden Wood on the boundary of Crockers Farm smallholding, Coldharbour, Surrey.51.1856°N 0.3535°W
- Mag's Well 51.1974°N 0.3628°W marking the border of Wotton and Westcott (before the 19th century Westcott was the western hamlet of Dorking) 500m north-east of Leith Hill Tower flowing first north to form one many ravines in the forest that covers all the northern slopes of Leith Hill, Wotton Common, an indented, tapering area with a notable waterfall for the longer stream rising here to the west, the Tillingbourne.

The geological varying depth of greensand top layers caused by erosion towards the underlying clay means that there is no uniform spring line in this part of the Greensand Ridge. The tower is the second highest point in the South-East of England. The Pipp Brook's main tributary, the Milton Brook rises at three close points in farmland on the indented north-east edge of the forest.

During the early nineteenth century the sulphate-rich (chalybeate) waters of the Mag's Well spring were attributed by a countryside travel writer as having aided a person's recovery.

=== Later Course ===
Both the Pipp Brook and the larger River Tillingbourne drain the northern slopes of Leith Hill and the watershed between the two rivers (which runs roughly north–south, marks the boundary between Westcott (which the brook drains entirely) and much larger Wotton. (Note: Note that the Tillingbourne flows westwards to meet the River Wey south of Guildford, whereas the Pipp Brook turns eastwards to meet the River Mole at Pixham.)

The Pipp Brook runs almost due east along its Dorking stretch north of much of the town and south of the steep scarp of the North Downs at Ranmore Common before joining the Mole at Pixham. (Note: Pixham was a hamlet of Dorking before achieving chapelry status and later full ecclesiastical parish status) The area around the confluence is the subject of occasional riparian (river) flooding as the rate of descent of the Mole decreases significantly and at the Mole Gap becomes or became subterranean, depending on amount of sedimentation.

The Pipp Brook itself has no sewage treatment works, few plains which it drains and as such an extremely narrow and low risk area of riparian flooding. These factors are instead present as to a few parcels of land of east Pixham sometimes considered Dorking by the national media based on a 2010s shorthand by the Environment Agency which has a 'Dorking Flood Area' comprising the sewage works, a handful of properties in Pixham and much of Brockham and Betchworth well upstream along the Mole to the east which are separated by more than a mile from Dorking and are narrowly in its post town.

== Watermills ==
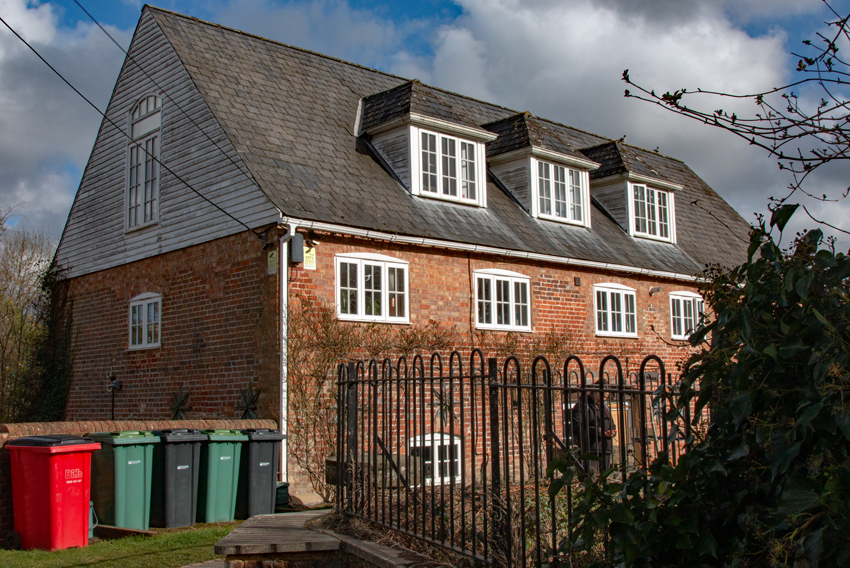
Pippbrook Mill in Dorking

By the 19th century six grain mills stood on the river: Rookery, Westcott, Milton Court, Parsonage, Pippbrook and Pixham Mills. All were defunct by the mid-20th century when bread production was widely commercialised and the product nationally was transformed to slow its staleness. Pippbrook Mill and Pixham Mill survive and are Grade II listed buildings.

== Water quality ==
The Environment Agency measures the water quality of the river systems in England. Each is given an overall ecological status, which may be one of five levels: high, good, moderate, poor and bad. There are several components that are used to determine this, including biological status, which looks at the quantity and varieties of invertebrates, angiosperms and fish. Chemical status, which compares the concentrations of various chemicals against known safe concentrations, is rated good or fail.

Water quality of the Pipp Brook in 2019:

Section	Ecological Status	Chemical Status	Overall Status	Length	Catchment	Channel
Pipp Brook	Poor	Fail	Poor	12.164 km (7.558 mi)	20.965 km^{2} (8.095 sq mi)	Heavily modified
