= Ralph Freeman (lawyer) =

English judge (1589–1667)

Sir Ralph Freeman (6 July 1589 – 12 June 1667) was an English civil judge born in St Mary-at-Hill, Billingsgate, London and lived at Military St Westminster. He was educated at Eton College then at King's College, Cambridge and was called to the Middle Temple bar in 1606 he later received a knighthood in 1617. He was also known as a dramatist and translator.

== Life and career ==
He succeeded Robert Naunton in his office of as one of six Masters of Requests in 1618. He had married a relation of George Villiers, 1st Duke of Buckingham, through whose influence he had also obtained a grant of [the rights of] pre-emption and transportation of tin for seven years in August 1613.

In 1622 he had a grant in reversion of the auditorship of imprests and of the auditorship of the Mint. Freeman hoped that through Lord Buckingham, he would succeed Thomas Murray as provost of Eton, but the appointment was given to Sir Henry Wotton. Freeman then unsuccessfully applied to Buckingham to be allowed to succeed Wotton as ambassador at Venice.

In 1626 and 1627 he was on a commission for the arrest of French ships and goods in England. In 1629 he held the office of auditor of imprests after a dispute as to its possession with Sir Giles Monpesson and purchased a large manor in Betchworth, Surrey for £1,080.

He became master worker of the mint at a salary of £500 per annum, when in 1635, jointly with Sir Thomas Aylesbury, he formed a commission exercising the powers of the Master of the Mint. This came about by the exclusion from the position of Robert Harley, in favour of the previous incumbent Randal Cranfield, who then died suddenly. Freeman was also one of the first appointed in February 1635 to the newly created office of 'searcher and sealer' of all foreign hops imported into England.

On the death of Sir Dudley Digges, Freeman bid high for the Master of the Rolls, which was taken by Sir Charles Caesar. With no known office in later life in 1655 he published Imperiale, a tragedy which he had written many years before; an unauthorised edition to which he refers had appeared in 1639. Freeman also published two verse translations from Seneca the Younger: the Booke of Consolation to Marcia (1635), and the other the Booke of the Shortnes of Life (2nd ed. 1663). At the last-given date Freeman was still alive.

== Personal life ==
He married Catherine Bret and had two sons: George Freeman, who died with his landed estate and without sons in 1678, and Ralph Freeman who held it in 1684 and in whose family's hands it would remain until sale in 1817.
