= Wotton Hundred =

Historical division of Surrey, England

Coordinates: 51.2°N 0.3°W

The Hundred of Wotton, Wotton Hundred or Dorking Hundred was a hundred in Surrey, England.

The hundred comprised a south-central portion of the county, clockwise the parishes of Abinger, Wotton, Dorking, Capel and Ockley.

The area's owner initially had pecuniary rights (to incomes) over parts of parishes on the borders of the area and just beyond, from just north of Guildford to Sussex. The site of the Hundred Court is indicated in the later medieval records as Dorking, hence its latter alternative name.

What vestiges of rights to minor rents and other such rights in the hundred still remained in the 17th century were granted to Sir Edward Zouche in 1620 by James I, and later passed to the Earls of Onslow, heirs to the estates of the Earls of Surrey.

Subsequent large village-size settlements within this area include the three Holmwoods collectively and Holmbury St Mary. The majority of it today, which is farmland or woodland, is Metropolitan Green Belt. The largest current settlement in the area is Dorking

== See also ==
- Medieval Surrey
- Surrey hundreds
