= List of public art in Surrey =

Public art in Surrey

This list comprises works of public art on permanent display in an outdoor public space in the county of Surrey, England. UK. For brevity this does not include markers and milestones, parts of buildings or ornamental features to main bridges, stained glass and other artistic works attached to places of worship. Art at Brookwood cemetery, the UK's most populous, are not listed here as its land is open to those paying their respects but private.

Indoor artworks are excluded from this list, including in the county's 11 district halls, at its University, schools and colleges, community halls and in the art museums and galleries in Surrey category. Community project millennial tapestries and embroideries are on public display in visitor centres at Dunsfold, Holmbury St Mary and Sunbury-on-Thames. Clock towers (including clock housings on metal posts) are excluded from the list such as in Abinger Hammer (although its colourful blacksmith sculpture striking a bell overhangs a public road), Bisley, Cobham, Epsom, and Sunbury. Wikipedia's list of Grade I listed buildings in Surrey is a government-backed list of the top historical and architectural structures and ruins including the somewhat intact castles: Farnham, Guildford and Reigate. Moved architecture/relics such as part of the Leptis Magna (Roman city) ruins and some fountains have been included, lacking practical purposes.

== Albury ==
Image	Subject	Location	Date	Sculptor/Artist	Source	Coordinates
	An image of Albury	Albury Heath, Albury	2006	Friedel Buecking		51.2102°N 0.4846°W
	The Optohedron	Newlands Corner	2020	Will Nash		51.2317°N 0.5008°W

== Burpham ==
Image	Subject	Location	Date	Sculptor/Artist	Source	Coordinates
	Sutherland Circle	Sutherland Memorial Park	2017	Steve Tomlinson		51°15′39″N 0°32′51″W

== Camberley ==
Image	Subject	Location	Date	Sculptor/Artist	Source	Coordinates
	Trollope and Colls White Elephant	London Road	1963/1964	Barbara Jones		51°19′59″N 0°46′15″W
Three women in dark form swirling in evocative poses	The Tambourine Girls (three women dancing)	London Road	1989	Charlotte Randall		51°20′5″N 0°45′50″W
	Into Our First World	Surrey Heath House, Camberley	1993	Ken Ford		51°20′21″N 0°44′35″W
	The Right Way (two metal figures, aloft, pointing to two directions)	Park Street and Obelisk Way	2009	Rick Kirby		51°20′17″N 0°45′53″W
	John Pennycuick	London Road Recreation Ground	2022			51°20′11″N 0°45′03″W

== Chertsey ==
Image	Subject	Location	Date	Sculptor/Artist	Source	Coordinates
	Charles James Fox	Outside Liberty House, Guildford Street, Chertsey		Ian Rank-Broadley		51.3879°N 0.5083°W
	Blanche Heriot	Outside Melita House, Bridge Street		Sheila Mitchell		51.3889°N 0.4882°W
	Bench to commemorate 100th anniversary of unveiling of Chertsey War Memorial	Outside St Peter's Church	30 October 2021			51.3923°N 0.5037°W

== Chobham ==
Image	Subject	Location	Date	Sculptor/Artist	Source	Coordinates
	Queen Victoria Monument	Beside Windsor Road, Chobham Common	1901			51.3809°N 0.6144°W
	Chobham Cannon	As above	1979 (replaced an earlier cannon of 1901)	Local workers		51.3478°N 0.60256°W

== Cranleigh ==
Image	Subject	Location	Date	Sculptor/Artist	Source	Coordinates
	Obelisk	Horsham Road and Ewhurst Road, Cranleigh	1794	Jacob Ellery		51.1408°N 0.4852°W

== Dorking ==
Image	Subject	Location	Date	Sculptor/Artist	Source	Coordinates
	Thomas Cubitt, MP and philanthropist	Opposite Dorking Halls, Reigate Road	2000	William Fawke		51.2350°N 0.3258°W
	Ralph Vaughan Williams, composer	Outside Dorking Halls, Reigate Road	2001	William Fawke		51.2348°N 0.3258°W
	Dorking Cockerel	Deepdene Roundabout, Dorking	2007	Peter Parkinson		51.2356°N 0.3224°W
	2012 Cyclist Sculpture for the Olympic Road Race	Pixham End roundabout	2012	Heather Burrell		51°14′41″N 0°19′28″W
	Grant Allen Arch	Allen Court, High Street	2013	Lucy Quinnell		51.2320°N 0.3321°W
	Mayflower	West Street	2021	Lucy Quinnell		51.2317°N 0.3350°W
	Radius	Denbies Wine Estate	2021	James Tunnard		51.2441°N 0.3405°W

== East and West Horsley ==
Image	Subject	Location	Date	Sculptor/Artist	Source	Coordinates
	Dancing Gypsy	Nomad Theatre, East Horsley		Faith Brook		

== Egham ==
Image	Subject	Location	Date	Sculptor/Artist	Source	Coordinates
	Magna Carta Fountain	High Street, Egham	1994	Neil Lawson Baker		51.4323°N 0.5462°W
	King John signing Magna Carta	High Street	1997	David Parfitt		51.4325°N 0.5451°W

== Epsom and Ewell ==
Image	Subject	Location	Date	Sculptor/Artist	Source	Coordinates
	'Dog Gate' (three oversized animals aloft around and above a public hall gate)	London Road and Spring Street, Ewell	c. 1795	Thomas Hercey Barritt		51.35033°N 0.25027°W
	John Gilpin as Spectre de la Rose	Outside Epsom Playhouse	1999	Tom Merrifield		51°19′53″N 0°16′12″W
	Evocation of Speed Diomed and Galileo (horses)	Derby Square, Epsom	2001	Judy Boyt		51°20′3″N 0°15′57″W
	Emily Davison, suffragette	Marketplace, High Street, Epsom	2021	Christine Charlesworth		51.3331°N 0.2689°W

== Esher ==
Image	Subject	Location	Date	Sculptor/Artist	Source	Coordinates
	Britannia (Queen Victoria Diamond Jubilee Memorial)	Esher High Street, in the town centre	1897	Francis John Williamson		51.3691°N 0.3659°W
	Queen Victoria Diamond Jubilee fountain	Esher High Street	1877			51°22′8″N 0°21′54″W

== Farnham ==
Image	Subject	Location	Date	Sculptor/artist	Source	Coordinates
	William Cobbett	Museum of Farnham garden	1940s	Willi Soukop		51.2128°N 0.8043°W
	Hawthorn Lodge panels	Hawthorn Lodge	1961	Rachel Brown and Carole Hodgson		51.2127°N 0.7976°W
	Farnham and the way it sits in hills and valleys	Farnham Delivery Office, West Street	1970	Michael Fairclough		51.2142°N 0.8015°W
	The Lion and Lamb	Lion and Lamb Yard	1985-86	Edwin Russell		51.2152°N 0.8015°W
	Andernach Millstone	South Street	1992			51.214°N 0.7954°W
	Outdoor Bathing	Victoria Garden	1999	Jane Jones		51.2133°N 0.7951°W
	Hands On	Farnham Library grounds	2000	West Street Potters, Farnham		51.2134°N 0.8032°W
	Millennium Child	Upper Church Lane	2000	Sue Broadhead		51.2139°N 0.7996°W
	Bookstools or Moments in Time	Farnham Library grounds	2003	Gillian Trotman		51.213°N 0.803°W
	Monument	Museum of Farnham garden	2013	Sally Woodford		51.2128°N 0.8043°W
	North Downs Way sculpture	A31 Farnham bypass	2015	FdK Design Consultants		51.2128°N 0.7938°W
	William Cobbett	Hawthorn Lodge	2016	Sheila Mitchell		51.2129°N 0.7977°W
	The Farnham Sculpture - acorn	New Ashgate Gallery	2020	David Mayne		51.2129°N 0.7994°W
	The Farnham Sculpture - oak tree	New Ashgate Gallery	2020	David Mayne		51.2129°N 0.7994°W
	A Hand's Turn	Riverside Walk	2023	Natalie Bradwell and Livia Spinolo		51.2122°N 0.7973°W
	Bishop	Bishop's Table Hotel, West Street				51.2138°N 0.803°W
	Bishop	Bishop's Table Hotel, West Street				51.2138°N 0.803°W
	Matriarch	Borelli Yard		Ben Franklin		51.2148°N 0.7982°W
	Unidentified sculpture	Farnham Library grounds				51.213°N 0.803°W
	Unidentified sculpture	Farnham Library grounds				51.213°N 0.803°W
	Unidentified sculpture	Farnham Library grounds				51.213°N 0.803°W

=== University for Creative Arts, Farnham campus ===
Image	Subject	Date	Sculptor/artist	Source	Coordinates
	The Ladder	1983	Charles Hewlings		51.216°N 0.804°W
	The Wave	1989	Charles Hewlings		51.2164°N 0.8046°W
	Untitled III	1989	Brandon Davison		51.2172°N 0.8043°W
	Pipe, Dance'	1997	Marcus Robinson		51.2165°N 0.8046°W
	Belief and Desire	1997	Michael Kenney		51.2157°N 0.8044°W
	Projection I	1998	Laurence Edwards		51.2159°N 0.8039°W
	Udder and Over	2002	Paul Cox		51.2163°N 0.8042°W
	Oaks on the Run	2004	Vincent Jack		51.216°N 0.8044°W
	A Fishy Tale - Another Brick in the Wall	2021	Farnham residents		51.2156°N 0.8038°W
	A Resting Place		Carl Anthony		51.2155°N 0.804°W
	Earth and Wine		Michael Kenney		51.2154°N 0.8044°W
	Unidentified sculpture				51.2163°N 0.8041°W

== Frimley ==
Image	Subject	Location	Date	Sculptor/Artist	Source	Coordinates
	Our Lady of Consolation	Outside Our Lady Queen of Heaven Church, Frimley	1940	John Francis Kavanagh		51.3167°N 0.7415°W
	Oak Leaf	The Green, Frimley Green	2018	Chris Bain		51.3020°N 0.7277°W

== Godalming ==
Image	Subject	Location	Date	Sculptor/Artist	Source	Coordinates
	Thomas Sutton	Charterhouse School, Godalming	1911	Goscombe John		
	Tribal	Waverley Borough Council offices, The Bury's, Godalming		Ruth Wheeler		51.187°N 0.6099°W

== Guildford ==
Image	Subject	Location	Date	Sculptor/Artist	Source	Coordinates
	Guildford and Freiburg im Breisgau coats of arms mosaic	Tunsgate, Guildford	1994			51.2357°N 0.5722°W
	Alice and the White Rabbit	Guildford Riverside	1984	Edwin Russell		51°14′4″N 0°34′36″W
	Alice through the looking glass	Guildford Castle grounds	1990	Jeanne Argent		51°14′00″N 0°34′19″W
	One Man and his Dog	Eastgate courtyard	1990	Edwin Russell		51°14′15″N 0°34′3″W
	The Surrey Scholar	bottom of High Street	2002	Allan Sly		51°14′07″N 000°34′29″W
	Vane II	Electric Theatre forecourt	1997/1998	Lucien Simon		
	Masquerade	Electric Theatre Forecourt	2005	Allan Sly		51°14′10″N 000°34′39″W
	Rhythm Blue	under Electric Theatre bridge		Peter Freeman		
	Totem Sculptures	Onslow Arboretum		Mary Branson		
	5 sculptures	Queen Elizabeth Park		Sue Fenton-Jones		
	Lido Tree Sculpture	Stoke cross-roads		Ruth Wheeler		
	Rising Stars	outside the Odeon		Steve Geliot		51°14′15″N 000°34′45″W
	George Abbot Sculpture	at the top of the High Street	1993	Faith Winter		51°14′11″N 000°34′13″W
	Height Barrier	access to Woodbridge Meadows car park		Richard Farringdon		51°14′41″N 000°34′49″W
	Mosaic	outside Debenhams		Martin Cheek		
	Reeds	Millmead Island		Ruth Wheeler		
	George Abbot Sculpture Garden	George Abbot School		Russell Jakubowski		
	Abstracts of Guildford	Guildford Spectrum		Gerry Baptist		
	The Dancers	outside Baker Tilly on the Boxgrove Crossroads roundabout		Jane Jones		51°14′56″N 0°33′12″W
	Benches at Millmead Lock	Millmead Island		Johny Woodford		51°13′59″N 000°34′31″W
	The Bargeman	the Wharf	2003	Utopia Forge		51°14′07″N 000°34′37″W
	Sculpture and five bronze tablets	Tunsgate	1989	Martin Jennings with poet Matt Black		
	Unknown (dancing figures)	Youth & Community Centre at Haydon Place				51°14′21″N 000°34′25″W
	Out of the Block/Head	Quaker's Acre off North Street	1996	Janine Creaye		51°14′12″N 000°34′19″W
	The Way Markers	Shalford Meadows and Artington Park & Ride		Mary Anstee Parry		
	Millennium Sundial	Millmead Gardens		Joanna Migdal		51°14′02″N 000°34′36″W
	Central Growth	Building on Market Street		Andrew Kay		51°14′10.53″N 0°34′22.03″W
	Opening lines of The Listeners by Walter de la Mare	Side of Premier Inn at Stoke Crossroads				51°14′54″N 000°34′15″W
	Astrolabe	Guildford House Gallery courtyard		Richard Quinnell		51°14′12″N 000°34′20″W
	Stained Glass	Boots on Swan Lane		Catrin Jones		51°14′08.82″N 0°34′27.65″W
	Farm Talk	Artington Park & Ride		Caroline Jackman and Jo Wood		51°13′06.6″N 0°34′49.44″W
	Seeds of Hope	Seeds of Hope Children's Garden at the Cathedral		Christine Charlesworth		
	White knight on a white horse	outside former White Horse Hotel, High Street				51°14′15″N 0°34′0″W
	Virtual Fountain	Printing House Square, Guildford	2012	Charlie Carter		
	Stone Obelisk	The Priestley Centre, Surrey Research Park				51°14′19″N 0°36′48″W
	Jabberwocky	Allen Pavilion Garden	2009?			51°14′19″N 0°34′7″W
	Silver Shoon	Woodbridge Meadows	2016	Charles Normandale		51°14′48″N 0°34′53″W
	Golden Pollen	Woodbridge Meadows		Tom Smith		51°14′48″N 0°34′53″W
	Cedar	Outside G Live				51°14′18″N 0°33′58″W
	Juno the Torch Relay Legacy	Outside G Live	2012	Ian Campbell-Briggs		51°14′17″N 0°33′59″W
	The Spine	Outside Royal Surrey County Hospital	?	Keir Smith		51°14′23.22″N 0°36′29.33″W
	Phoenix	Outside Royal Surrey County Hospital	?	Martin Cundell		51°14′23.22″N 0°36′29.33″W
	Abbot's Hospital quatercentenary ceramic mural	Jeffries Passage	2019	Liliana Montoya and Carlos España		51°14′10″N 000°34′16″W
	Abbot's Hospital quatercentenary ceramic mural	Jeffries Passage	2019	Liliana Montoya and Carlos España		51°14′10″N 000°34′16″W
	Abbot's Hospital quatercentenary ceramic mural	Jeffries Passage	2019	Liliana Montoya and Carlos España		51°14′10″N 000°34′16″W
	Abbot's Hospital quatercentenary ceramic mural	Jeffries Passage	2019	Liliana Montoya and Carlos España		51°14′10″N 000°34′16″W
	Fragment with Falling Star	Royal Surrey County Hospital		Keir Smith		51°14′28″N 0°36′32″W
	Sundial featuring Edward I and Eleanor	Castle Street	1972	Ann Garland		51°14′5″N 000°34′19″W

=== University of Surrey ===
Image	Subject	Location	Date	Sculptor/Artist	Source	Coordinates
	All the Gang Are Here	University of Surrey campus	2007	Carol Orwin		
	Geodesic Dome	University of Surrey campus	1982	Based on an original by Buckminster Fuller		51°14′36″N 0°35′14″W
	Spine 3	University of Surrey campus	2004	Diane Maclean		51°14′36″N 0°35′13″W
	Alan Turing	On the Piazza, University of Surrey campus	2004	John W. Mills		
	The Surrey Stag	Entrance to the University of Surrey campus	2009	Allan Sly		51°14′29″N 0°35′43″W
	Knife Birds	In front of the School of Management Building, University of Surrey campus	2004	Bridget McCrum		
	Narcissus	University of Surrey campus		William Pye		51°14′34″N 0°35′18″W
	Thinking Of My Future	Behind Senate House, in the amphitheatre, University of Surrey campus	2010	Christopher Chipfuya		
	Mural	Outside of the Lecture Theatre Block, University of Surrey campus	1980	Duncan Newton		
	Ceramic mural	Outside of the Students’ Union, University of Surrey campus		Students at the Roehampton Institute Art Department		
	Walkways	above Spine Road, University of Surrey campus	1996	Peter Jeffery		
	Spiral	in front of Postgraduate Medical School, Manor Park Campus, University of Surrey		Bridget McCrum		51°14′21″N 0°36′45″W
	Triple Ripple	Manor Park Campus, University of Surrey	2008	Diane Maclean		51°14′20″N 0°36′25″W
	Acrobat	Foyer of Austin Pearce Building, University of Surrey		Natalie Staniforth		
	Fish	Outside Senate House		Daren Greenhow		
	Fish	Outside Senate House		Daren Greenhow		
	Fish	Outside the Library		Daren Greenhow		
	Charmer	Performing Arts technology studios	2011	Jon Edgar		

== Haslemere ==
Image	Subject	Location	Date	Sculptor/Artist	Source	Coordinates
	Elizabeth I	Charter Walk	2001	Malcolm Stathers		51°05′18″N 0°42′36″W
	Progress	High Street	2020	Andrew Brighty		51°05′18″N 0°42′32″W
	Mimesis	Clements Corner	2020	Andrew Brighty		51°05′18″N 0°43′20″W
	Serenade to the Sky	Lion Green	2021	Andrew Brighty		51°05′16″N 0°43′51″W

== Leatherhead ==
Image	Subject	Location	Date	Sculptor/Artist	Source	Coordinates
	Girl with Doves	Station Approach, Leatherhead	1973 cast of 1970 original	David Wynne		51°17′56″N 0°20′1.68″W
	The Leopard	Station Approach, Leatherhead	1983 (moved to Leatherhead in 2009)	Jonathan Kenworth		51°17′57.12″N 0°20′00.24″W
	'Bridges' Ironwork	Leatherhead High Street, Leatherhead	Unknown	Peter Parkinson, Lawrence Walker, Richard Quinnell, Lucy Quinnell		51°17′42.8″N 0°19′46.9″W
	Bindi Dreamer	Swan Shopping Centre, Leatherhead	2000	Jilly Sutton		51°17′44.6″N 0°19′40.3″W
	Mole Gap Sculpture	Leatherhead Park, Leatherhead	2002	Terrence M. Clarke		51°17′49.6″N 0°19′57.2″W
	The Leatherhead Kingfisher	Kingston Road, Leatherhead	2022	Peter Parkinson, Lawrence Walker, Richard Quinnell, Lucy Quinnell		51°18′43″N 0°20′02″W

== Longcross ==
Image	Subject	Location	Date	Sculptor/Artist	Source	Coordinates
	Bloom	Longcross Park	2018	Wolfgang Buttress		51.3804°N 0.5926°W

== Molesey ==
Image	Subject	Location	Date	Sculptor/Artist	Source	Coordinates
	Eights Tree	by River Thames / Tagg's Island, Molesey	2001	Ray Smith		51°24′27″N 0°21′6″W
	Molesey Jubilee Drinking Fountain	Wolsey Road and Bridge Road, Molesey	1887 (redesigned for the Diamond Jubilee of Queen Elizabeth II, 2012)			51°24′6″N 0°20′46″W

== Reigate and Redhill ==
Image	Subject	Location	Date	Sculptor/Artist	Source	Coordinates
	Inglis Memorial Lieutenant Colonel Sir Robert William Inglis VC	Colley Hill, Reigate	1909			51°15′13″N 0°12′35″W
	Park Hill Monument	Reigate Hill, Reigate	1920			51°13′48″N 0°12′35″W
	Margot Fonteyn, ballet dancer, prima ballerina	outside Watson House, London Road, Reigate	1980	Nathan David		51°14′26″N 0°12′19″W
	The Buskers	Cage Yard, Reigate	1993	Carole Vincent		51°14′14″N 0°12′27″W
	Redland brick knot	esure, Reigate				51°14′18″N 0°12′9″W

== Runnymede ==
Image	Subject	Location	Date	Sculptor/Artist	Source	Coordinates
	Magna Carta Memorial	On Cooper's Hill, Runnymede	1957	Edward Maufe		51.4445°N 0.566°W
	John F. Kennedy memorial	On Cooper's Hill, Runnymede	1965	Geoffrey Jellicoe		51.4447°N 0.5687°W
	Commonwealth Air Forces Memorial	On Cooper's Hill, Runnymede	1953	Edward Maufe		51.4378°N 0.565°W
	bronze statue of Queen Elizabeth II on octagonal stone base	Runnymede Pleasure Ground	2015	James Butler		

== Staines-upon-Thames ==
Image	Subject	Location	Date	Sculptor/Artist	Source	Coordinates
	Spelthorne coat of arms mosaic	High Street, middle of pedestrianised section	2002	Gary Drostle		51.4343°N 0.5104°W
	Gateway mosaic panels	High Street, middle of pedestrianised section	2002	Gary Drostle		51.4348°N 0.5093°W
	Release Every Pattern (Linoleum Workers)	High Street, west end		David Annand		51.4338°N 0.5121°W
	The Swanmaster	Fairfield Avenue, Staines		Diana Thomson		51°26′11″N 0°30′25″W
	The Swan Arches	Entrances to Memorial Gardens		Anthony and Simon Robinson, and pupils from Kingscroft Junior School (now Riverbridge Primary School)		51.4329°N 0.51402°W
	Water Nymph statues	Memorial Gardens	1980 (moved here 2006)	David Wynne		51.4327°N 0.51405°W
	Origami swans	Memorial Gardens	2002	Tom Brown		51.43251°N 0.5139°W
	London Stone (riparian) (replica)	Memorial Gardens				51.43255°N 0.51418°W
	The River Guardian (Heron)	At confluence of River Colne with River Thames, near Staines Bridge		Simon Buchanan		51.43295°N 0.51546°W
	Pound Mill Sculpture	Wraysbury Road, Staines		John Atkin		51.4359°N 0.51515°W
	Memorial to British European Airways Flight 548	Waters Drive Recreation Ground	2012			51.43823°N 0.5123°W
	Water Sprites (combined hominid forms tapering above, exceeding head-height)	Two Rivers Shopping and Entertainment Centre		David Backhouse		
	Time Continuum (sundial)	Two Rivers Shopping and Entertainment Centre		David Backhouse		

== Sunbury-on-Thames ==
Image	Subject	Location	Date	Sculptor/Artist	Source	Coordinates
	Lendy Memorial (lion)	The Walled Garden, Sunbury-on-Thames	1895 (moved to current site 1986)	Local residents		51.4063°N 0.4095°W
	Cherubs	The Walled Garden	19th century			51.4064°N 0.4095°W
	Desert Orchid	Kempton Park, near the grandstand	1991	Philip Blacker		51.4205°N 0.4091°W

== Virginia Water ==
Image	Subject	Location	Date	Sculptor/Artist	Source	Coordinates
	Totem Pole (very tall pole, carved)	In Windsor Great Park, near Virginia Water Lake (north side)	1958	Mungo Martin		51°25′01″N 0°35′30″W
	Leptis Magna Ruins (tall columns and some architraves)	As above (south side)	c. 1st century BC (placed here 1816)			51°24′31″N 0°36′00″W
	Cumberland Obelisk / Prince William, Duke of Cumberland	Obelisk Pond, Windsor Great Park	commissioned 1765			51°25′29″N 0°35′51″W

== Walton-on-Thames ==
Image	Subject	Location	Date	Sculptor/Artist	Source	Coordinates
	Welcome Home. Steel sculpture which can be viewed as a penguin (commemorating the former Birds Eye headquarters on this site) or a Spitfire (commemorating Flight Sergeant Charles Sydney who was shot down nearby during the Battle of Britain)	Walton Court Garden	2024	Stuart Melrose		51°22′29″N 0°24′42″W

== Weybridge ==
Image	Subject	Location	Date	Sculptor/Artist	Source	Coordinates
	Yool Memorial. Commemorates Henry Yool, a former Vice-chairman of Surrey County Council. Originally on Weybridge Hill, it was moved to its current location in 1971.	Junction of Hanger Hill and Princes Road	1896			51°22′08″N 0°27′07″W
	York Column (The Monument). Stood at Seven Dials, London until 1777. Installed on Monument Green in 1822 to commemorate the Duchess of York, who lived at Oatlands House, and who died in 1820.	Monument Green	1697	Edward Piece		51°22′24″N 0°27′20″W

== Whiteley Village ==
Image	Subject	Location	Date	Sculptor/Artist	Source	Coordinates
	William Whiteley, Copper statue on pedestal with plaques	Whiteley Village, Hersham	1914	George Frampton		

== Woking ==
Image	Subject	Location	Date	Sculptor/Artist	Source	Coordinates
	Martian tripod (aloft on slender, angular legs)	Church Street East, Woking	1998	Michael Condron		51°19′14″N 0°33′25″W
	Martian cylinder	Church Street East, Woking	1998	Michael Condron		51°19′14″N 0°33′25″W
	Hawker Hunter	Church Street East, outside the Big Apple leisure complex	1996, Removed July 2018			51°19′13″N 0°33′23″W
	William Robert Grove	Woking Park	2003	Ulli Knall		51°18′42″N 0°33′24″W
	Fuel Cell Mural	Woking Park	2003			51°18′42″N 0°33′24″W
	Pegasus	Brewery Road	2009	Tree Pirates		51°19′19″N 0°33′38″W
	Exchanging Luminance	Outside of The Lightbox	2010	Richard Jackson		51°19′17″N 0°33′34″W
	Winning Shot	Jubilee Square	2012	Christine Charlesworth		51°19′13″N 0°33′32″W
	The Space Between	Plaza, Orion Gate, Guildford Road	2012	Richard Heys		51°18′58″N 0°33′38″W
	Lakers Life	Outside of the Lightbox	2014 only?	Jono Retallick, George Otto, Rib Davis, Lakers Youth Centre		51°19′17″N 0°33′34″W
	Surrey Hills	Wolsey Place Shopping Centre	2014	Sara Holmes		
	Sir Alec Bedser bowling	next to Bedser Bridge	2015	Allan Sly		51°19′17″N 0°33′36″W
	Eric Bedser batting	next to Bedser Bridge	2015	Allan Sly		51°19′17″N 0°33′36″W
	Seated Man	Woking station	2017	Sean Henry		51°19′09″N 0°33′24″W
	Standing Man	Mercia Walk	2017	Sean Henry		
	Standing Woman	Peacock Centre	2017	Sean Henry		51°19′11″N 0°33′34″W
	Walking Woman	Commercial Road	2017	Sean Henry		
	The Wanderer	Albion Square	2017	Sean Henry		51°19′08″N 0°33′27″W
	Catafalque	Victoria Square	2017	Sean Henry		
	H G Wells	Victoria Gate	2017	Wesley Harland		
	Ethel Smyth	Dukes Court Plaza	2022	Christine Charlesworth		51°19′14″N 0°33′17″W
	Standing Figure (Man)	Henry Plaza	2022	Sean Henry		51°19′07″N 0°33′38″W
	Standing Figure (Woman)	Henry Plaza	2022	Sean Henry		51°19′07″N 0°33′38″W
	?	Henry Plaza	2022			51°19′07.65″N 0°33′40.66″W
	Going Underground	Mercia Walk	c. 1995	Reece Ingram		51°19′14″N 0°33′33″W
	Fuel Cell mural	Woking Park	2003	Alan Potter		51°18′42″N 0°33′24″W

== See also ==
- War memorials in Surrey
