= Boyt =

Boyt is a surname. Notable people with the surname include:

- Judy Boyt (born 1954), English sculptor and ceramist
- Susie Boyt (born 1969), English novelist and journalist

== See also ==
- Boyt Company Building, historic building in Des Moines, Iowa
