= Statue of Thomas Cubitt =

Statue in London, England

Coordinates: 51.4886°N 0.1387°W

Thomas Cubitt
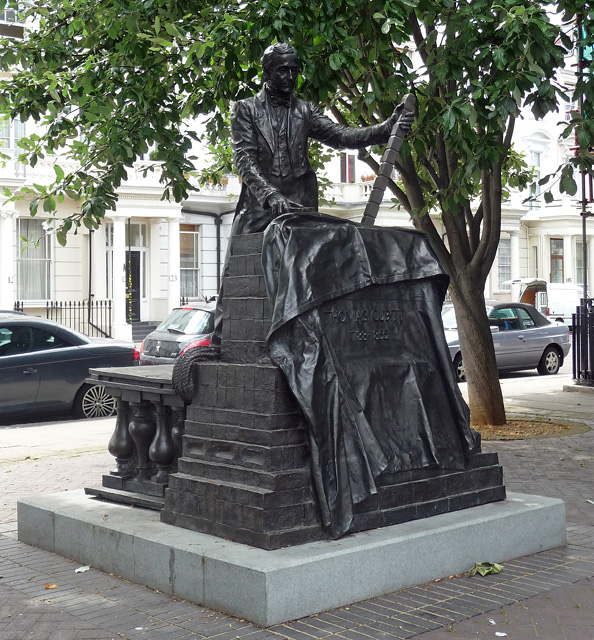
- Artist: William Fawke
- Completion date: 1995
- Subject: Thomas Cubitt
- Location: London

The statue of Thomas Cubitt is a statue that stands in Pimlico, London, on the intersection of Denbigh Street and St George's Drive.

Thomas Cubitt was a Master builder who worked throughout London. His contributions include parts of the Victoria Embankment, Buckingham Palace as well as extensive work on Pimlico and Belgravia, which would host his building works and later be given the nickname of 'Mr Cubitt's District'. Cubitt was also well known for his interest in public and charitable works. Much of his will was dedicated to charity and was the longest on record.

The statue was unveiled in 1995 by the Duke of Westminster. The site was given by the Sanctuary Housing Association Designed by William Fawke, it depicts Cubitt standing atop a pile of bricks in the process of inspecting them. In 2000, a statue from the same cast was erected in Dorking.
