= Dorking chicken =

British breed of chicken

Dorking
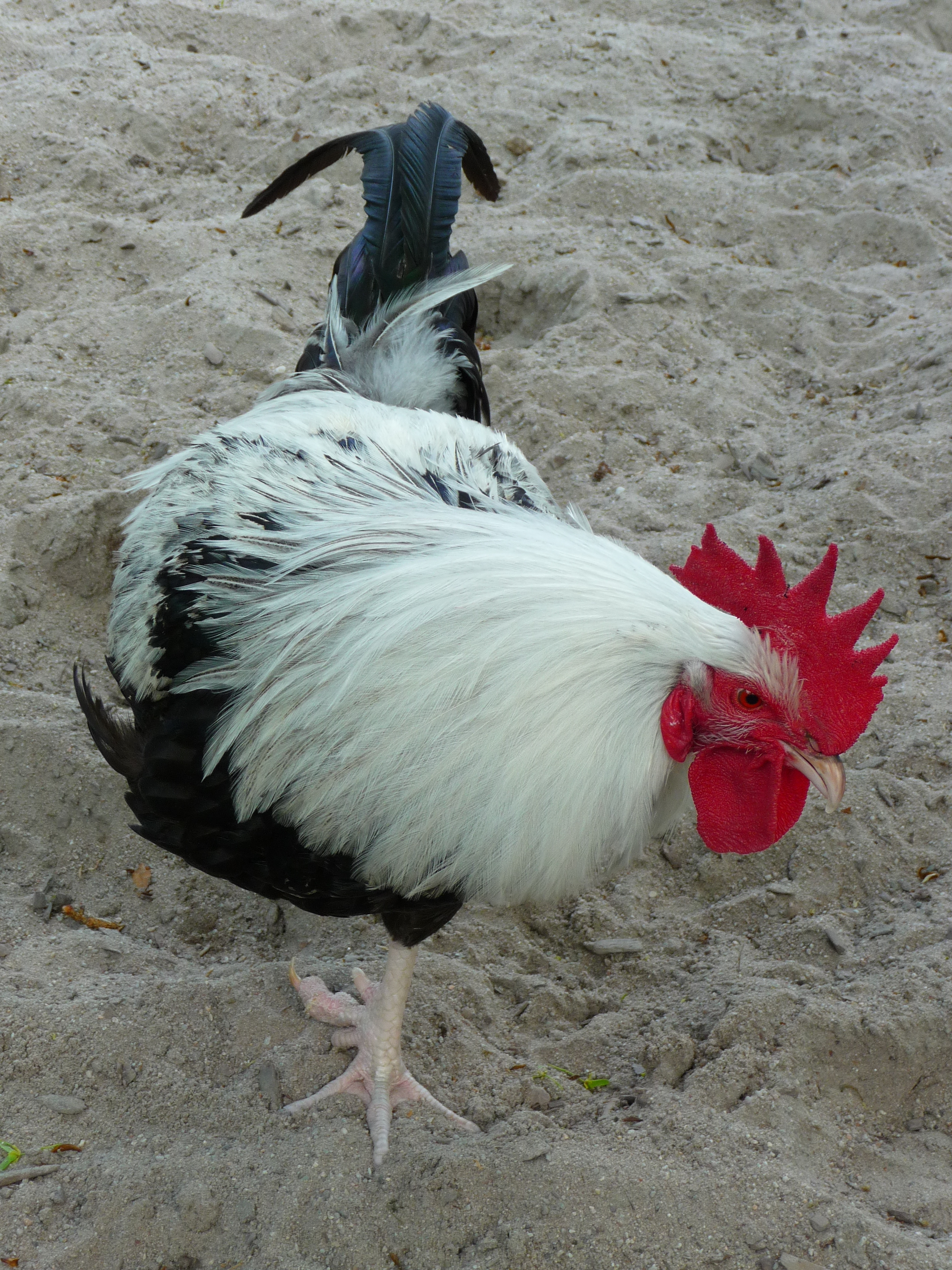
- A silver-grey cock
- Conservation status: FAO (2007): endangered-maintained
- Country of origin: United Kingdom

Traits
- Weight: Male: Standard: 3.60-6.35 kg; Bantam: 1130–1360 g; Female: Standard: 3.60-4.55 kg; Bantam: 910–1130 g
- Skin colour: white
- Egg colour: white or tinted
- Comb type: single or rose-comb

Classification
- APA: Large fowl: English; Bantam: Single comb clean legged
- EE: recognised
- PCGB: Soft feather: heavy
- Chicken; Gallus gallus domesticus

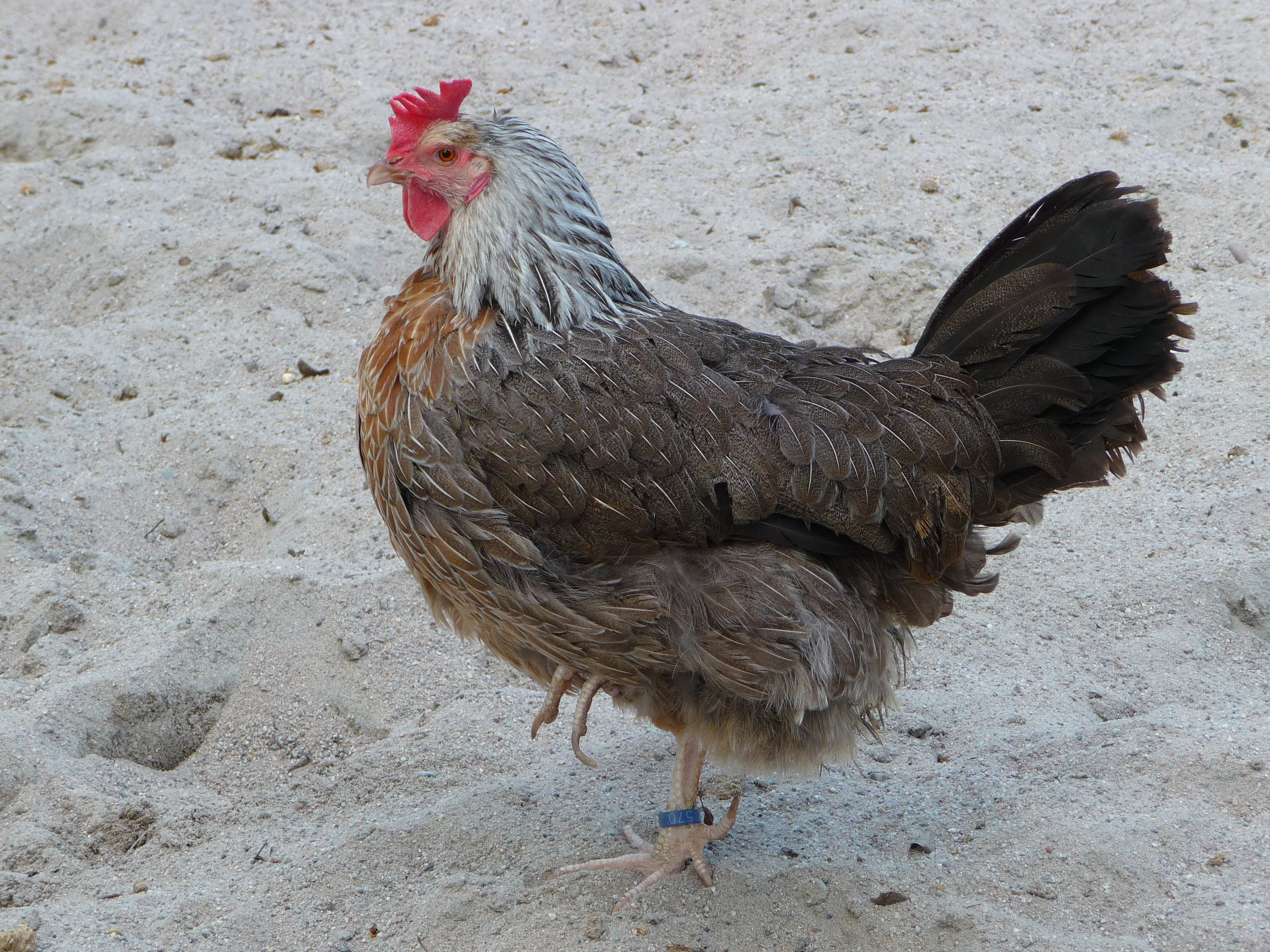
A silver-grey hen bird

The Dorking is a British breed of domestic chicken. It is named after the town of Dorking, in Surrey in southern England.

== History ==
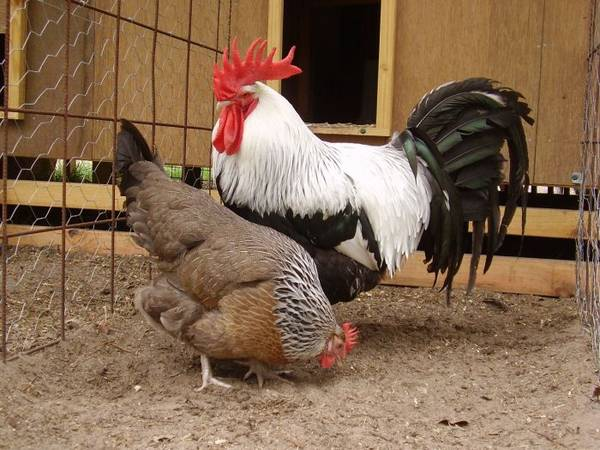
A silver-grey pair

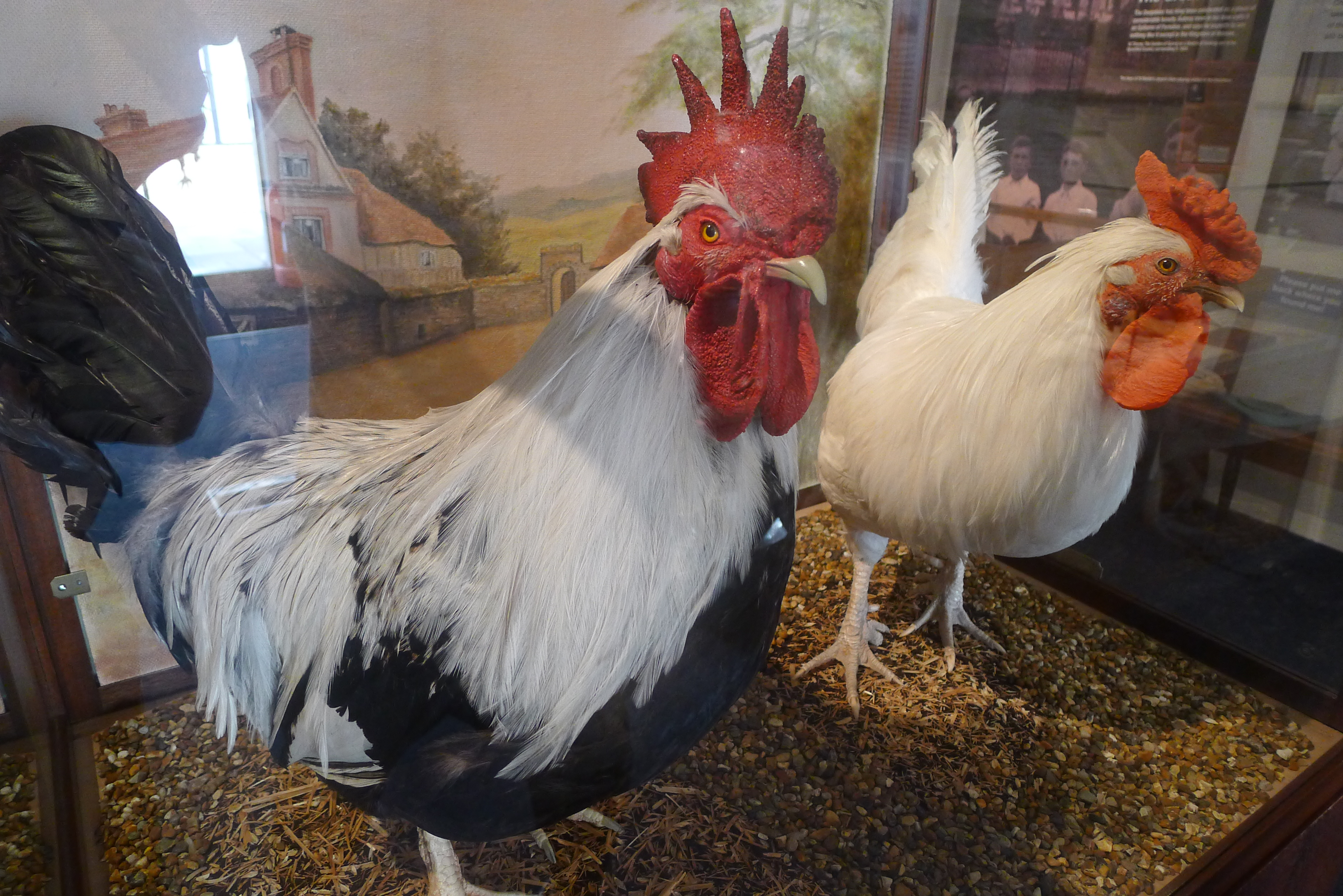
Taxidermied Silver grey cock bird and white one

The Dorking is among the oldest British chicken breeds. It has sometimes been suggested that it derives from five-toed (rather than the usual four-toed) chickens brought to Britain by the Romans in the first century AD, but it is not known whether the Romans brought poultry with them, nor if they found five-toed poultry when they arrived. The Roman writer Columella, active at that time, mentions five-toed hens as being the best breeding-stock: "they are reckoned the most generous which have five toes".

The Dorking originated in the southern home counties in south-east England, and is named after the market town of Dorking, in Surrey, from where birds were sent to the markets of London. It was the principal meat breed supplied to the metropolis until it was displaced by the Sussex in the early part of the twentieth century; it also became popular as an exhibition bird. It was among the breeds shown at the first poultry show, at London Zoo in 1845.

The Dorking was included in the first poultry standard, The Standard of Excellence in Exhibition Poultry, edited by William Bernhardt Tegetmeier and published in 1865 by the original Poultry Club of Great Britain. In the late nineteenth century, separate breed societies formed for the various colour varieties; two of these merged to form the Dorking Club, and a Scottish Dorking Club also formed. By about the time of the Second World War, none of these remained active. Interest in the breed had decreased rapidly, and it drew close to extinction. The Dorking Club was restarted in 1970.

Three colour varieties – coloured, silver-grey and white – were included in the first Standard of Perfection of the American Poultry Association in 1874; the red was added in 1995. Three bantam varieties – coloured, silver-grey and rose-comb white – were added in 1960.

== Characteristics ==
The Dorking has a rectangular body with short, five-toed legs. As with all single comb poultry, the comb points may require protection in extremely cold weather. Dorkings are well known for their versatility as a breed for both egg and meat production. It is one of the few breeds with red earlobes that produces a white-shelled egg. The skin colour beneath the feathers is white. The weight is 4.55–6.35 kilograms (10–14 lb) for cocks, 3.60–5.00 kg (8–11 lb) for cockerels and 3.60–4.55 kg (8–10 lb) for hens. There are five recognised colour varieties: white, silver-grey, red, dark and cuckoo.

== Gallery ==
Illustrations by Harrison Weir

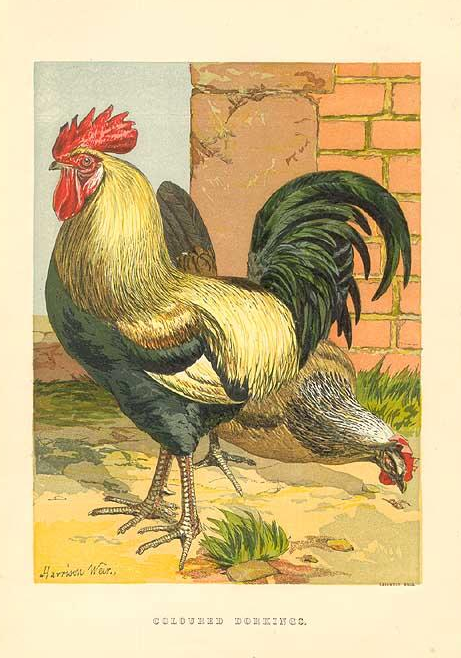
Coloured Dorking

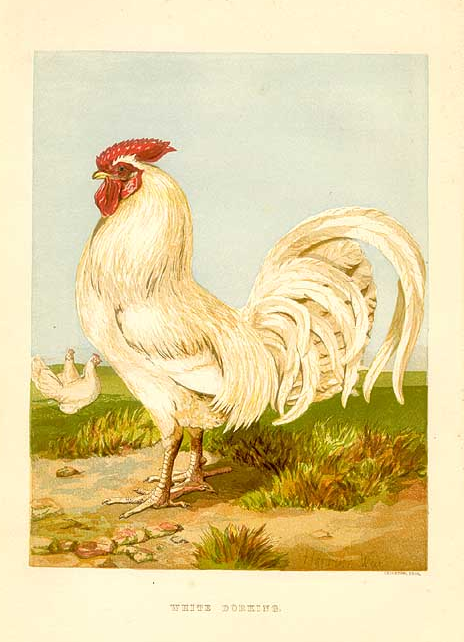
White Dorking

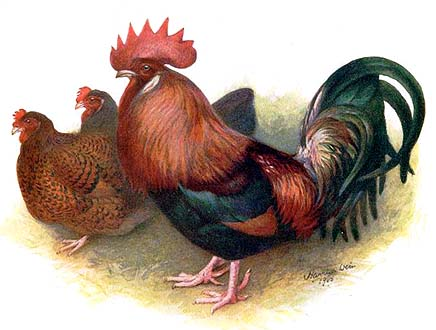
Red Dorkings

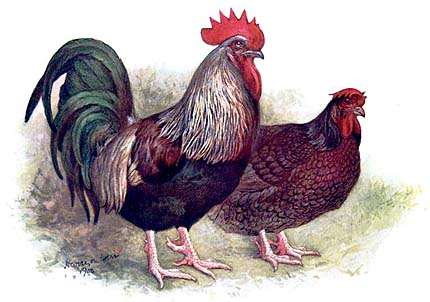
Prize Dark Dorkings

== See also ==
- Dorking Cockerel, public art in Dorking, England that depicts the Dorking chicken
