= Sean Henry (artist) =

British sculptor (born 1965)

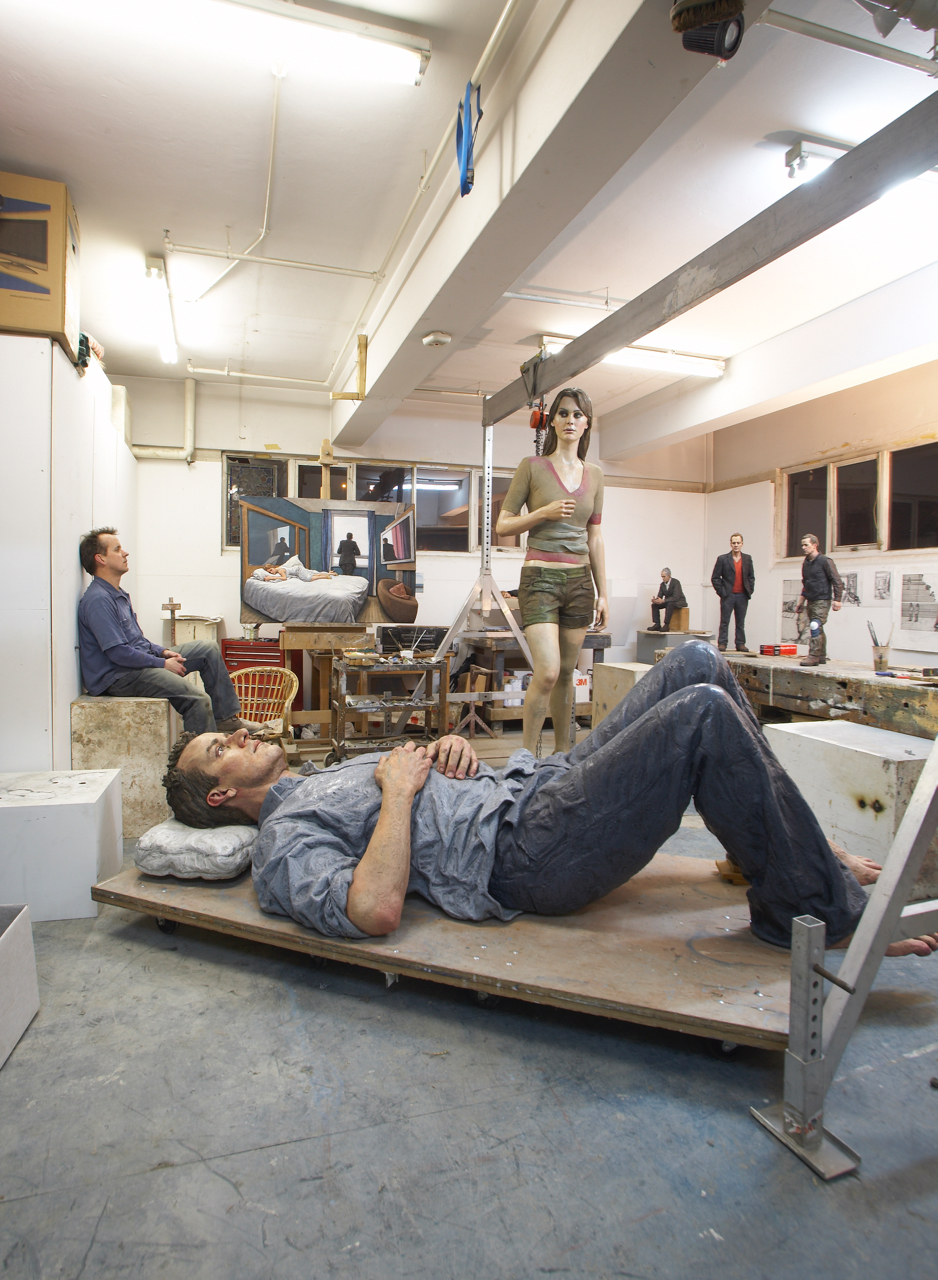
- Sean Henry Studio, 2006
- Born: 1965 (age 60–61); Woking Surrey, England
- Education: Farnham School of Art; Bristol Polytechnic
- Known for: Polychrome sculpture
- Awards: Villiers David Prize
- Website: www.seanhenry.com

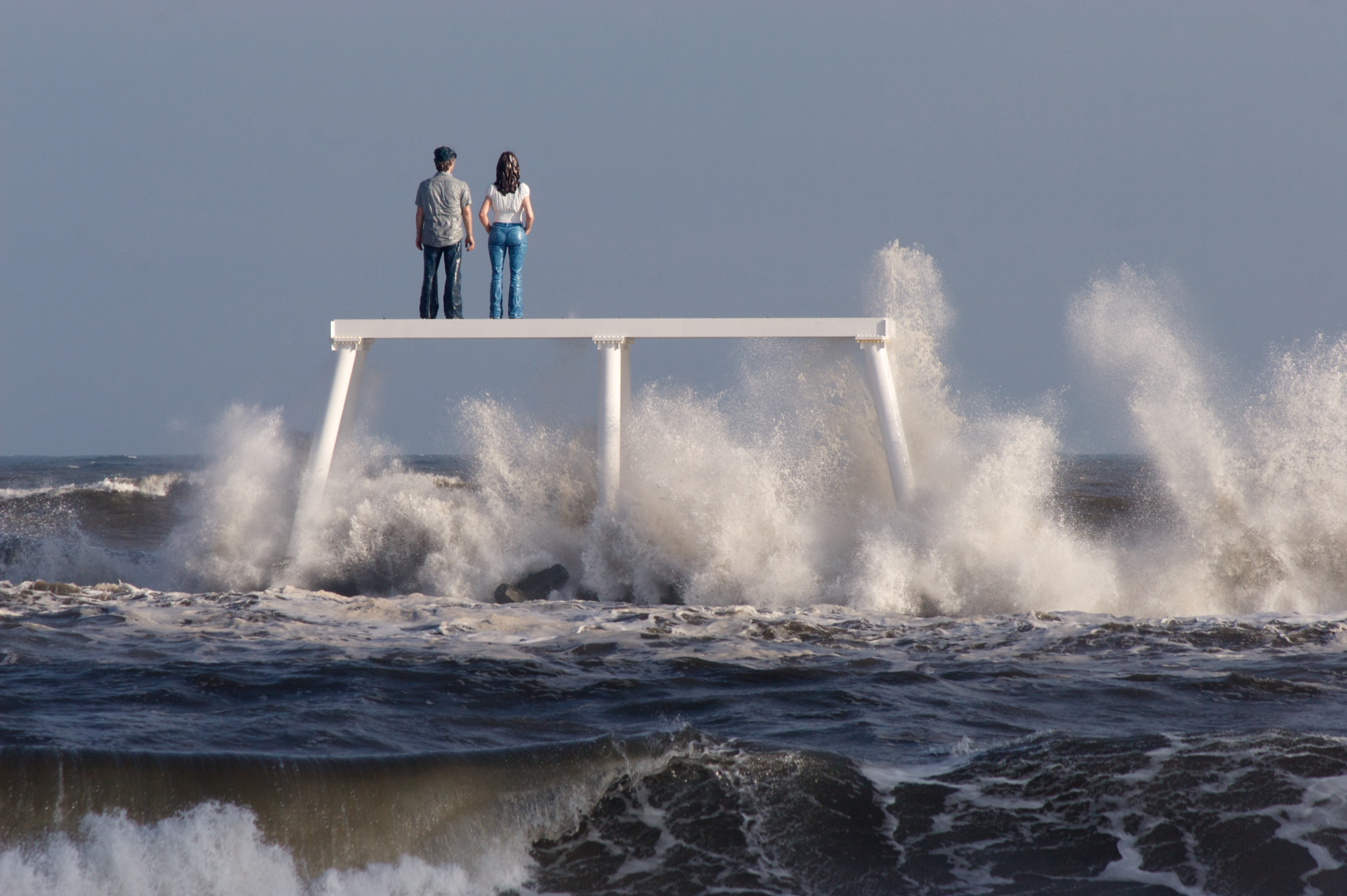
COUPLE, 2007, Bronze, steel, marine paint, 12.25 x 21 x 6 m, Permanent installation, Newbiggin Bay, Northumberland

Tim Berners Lee, 2015, Bronze, oil paint, 114 cm

Woman (Being Looked At), 2006, Bronze, paint, 260 x 82 x 74 cm, The Peacock Centre, Woking

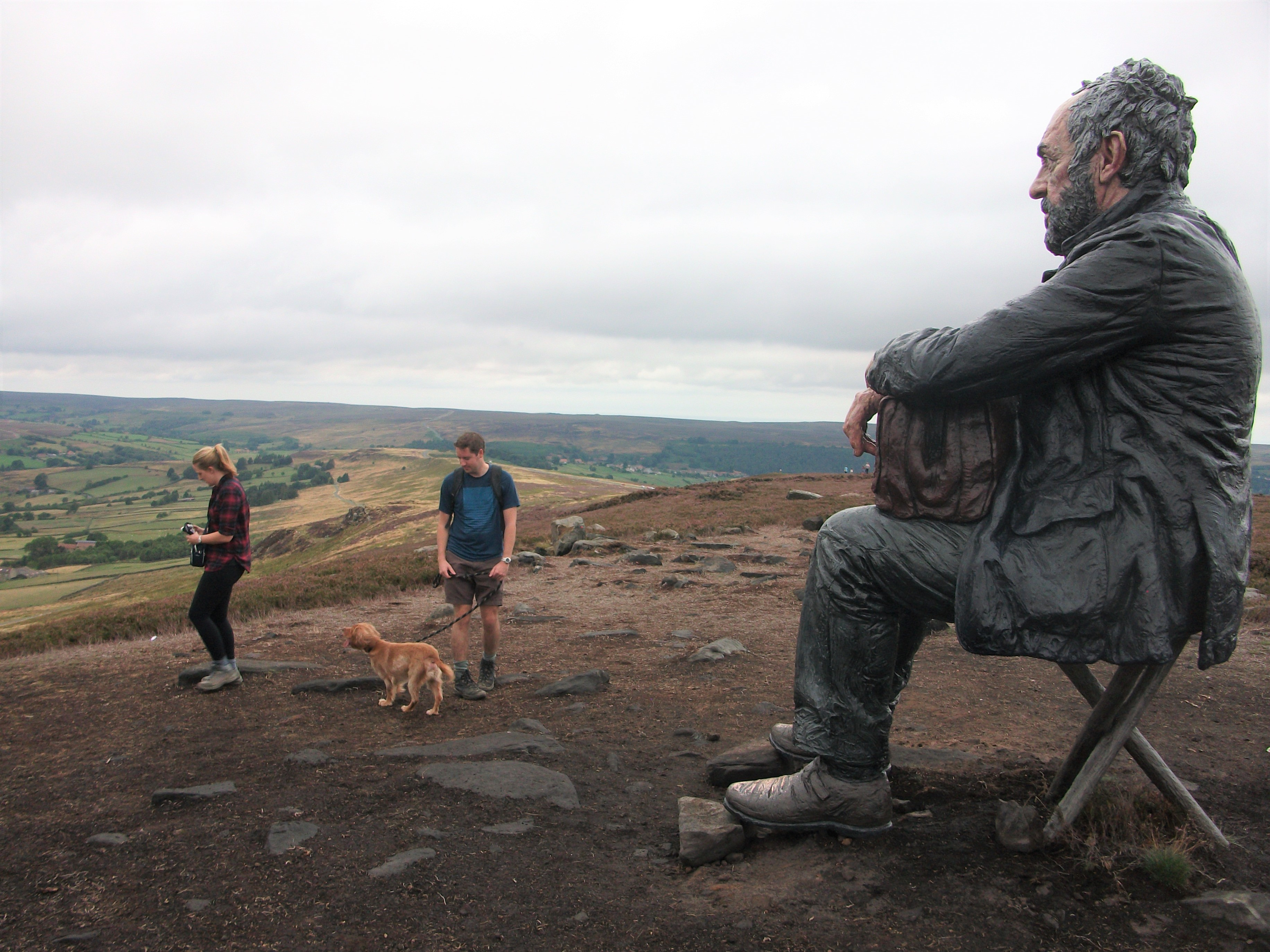
Seated Figure, Castleton Rigg

Sean Henry (born 1965, Woking, Surrey) is a British sculptor, based in Hampshire, England. His work includes private and public installations in many locations across Europe and the USA. Fusing the disciplines of ceramics with those of sculpture to create a fresh, innovative approach to representing the human figure, Henry's painted figures have helped to revive the long tradition of polychrome sculpture.

== Early life ==
Henry grew up in Surrey, England and studied at Farnham School of Art (now University for the Creative Arts) before taking a BA in ceramics at Bristol Polytechnic from 1984 to 1987. He was the visiting artist at the University of California from 1991 to 1992, and won the Villiers David Prize in 1998, becoming the first sculptor to win the award.

== Works ==
His works include Walking Man in London's Holland Park (1998) and Man with Potential Selves in the centre of Newcastle upon Tyne (2001). Editions of Walking Woman can be found in London, Oslo, Bad Homburg and Colchester, Essex. He completed the UK's first permanent offshore sculpture, Couple, in 2007, a critically acclaimed 13m high sculpture located 300m off the coast of Northumberland in Newbiggin Bay. Other noteworthy works include Standing Man in Stockholm (2010), Lying Man at the Frederik Meijer Gardens & Sculpture Park in Michigan, USA (2011). More recently Seated Figure, a 3m high sculpture can be seen located within the North York Moors National Park (2017). In 2019 Seated Figure was removed from its location on Castleton Rigg amid concerns that the large number of visitors it was attracting were damaging the local moorland. It was moved to the Yorkshire Sculpture Park in Wakefield.

2017-2020 saw seven of Henry's works being permanently installed in various locations across Woking, Surrey, included Seated Man (2011) and the powerful figure of The Wanderer (2013) inside and outside Woking train station. In Jubilee Square, the contemplative Standing Man (2009) now mixes with pedestrians, and in 2020 the final cast of Catafalque (2003) joined the collection in the newly completed Victoria Square.

Henry describes the theme of his work as “the tension between the making and staging of figures that seem to belong to the real world, and the degree to which they echo our experiences and sympathies”. Art historian Tom Flynn has said "through vigorously expressive modelling Henry imbues his figures with a powerful psychological presence, the theme of life and death a constant subtext".

Henry's first solo show was in London in 1988 and he has since gone on to exhibit his work widely in both solo and group exhibitions in the UK, USA, Sweden, Germany, Holland, Italy, Australia, Greece and Switzerland.

In 2008, Scala Publishers published a comprehensive monograph on Henry's work, written by the art historian Tom Flynn. This was followed in 2011 by a second Scala publication Conflux at Salisbury Cathedral to mark Henry's solo exhibition of 22 figures at Salisbury Cathedral. In 2015 the National Portrait Gallery in London commissioned Henry to create a painted bronze sculpture of Sir Tim Berners-Lee, the founder of the World Wide Web. Henry has been represented by the Osborne Samuel Galler in London since 1999, and by Galleri Andersson Sandström in Sweden since 2004.

== Notable works ==
- Seated Figure (2017) North York Moors National Park, and The Hills, Queenstown, NZ
- Woman (Being Looked At) (2005) Strandverket, Sweden, Folketheatret, Oslo and Woking Town Centre, UK
- Tim Berners-Lee (2015) National Portrait Gallery, London, England
- Catafalque (2003/2011) Frederik Meijer Gardens & Sculpture Park, Michigan, USA, the Seven Bridges Foundation, Connecticut, USA, and the University of Boras, Sweden
- Lying Man (2003/2011) Frederik Meijer Gardens & Sculpture Park, Michigan, USA.
- Standing Man (2009) Stockholm City Collection, Stockholm, Sweden
- Walking Woman (2008) Christian Ringes - Ekeberg Sculpture Park, Oslo, Norway
- Multi-figure installation (2008) Standard Chartered Bank, London, UK
- Couple (2007) Newbiggin-by-the-Sea, Northumberland, UK.
- Folly (The Other Self) 2007–2011) Cass Sculpture Foundation, Goodwood, Sussex, UK
- Meeting Place (2003) Paddington Central Development, London, UK
- Man with Potential Selves (2003) Newcastle City Collection, Newcastle upon Tyne, UK, Le Meridien Cumberland Hotel, Marble Arch, London, UK and Umedalen skulpturepark, Umea City Collection, Umea, Sweden
- Two Figures (2003) Sheldon Square, Paddington Basin, London, UK
- T.P.O.L.R. (2002) The Seavest Collection, Florida, USA
- Ben (Ideas Unresolved) (2001) University of Virginia Art Museum, Charlottesville, VA, USA
- Walking Man (1998) Holland Park, Royal Borough of Kensington & Chelsea, London, UK
- Hard to Swallow (1991) Arizona State University Museum, Arizona, USA

== Books and Catalogues ==
- Howard Jacobson ‘TIME BEING’ Osborne Samuel, 64p, 210 x 260 mm 2016
- Aidan Dunne ‘SEAN HENRY’ Forum Gallery, New York, 28 p, 216 x 280 mm, 2015
- Sean Henry, Tom Flynn ‘Aidan Dunne ‘SEAN HENRY’ Galleri Andersson Sandström, Sweden, 36 p, 210 x 210 mm, 2014
- Peter Osborne, Tom Flynn, Sean Henry ‘SEAN HENRY AT GLYNDEBOURNE’ Osborne Samuel, 36p, 235 x 180 mm, 2013
- Ann Elliot ‘THE WAY IT IS’ Osborne Samuel, 46 p, 280 x 220 mm, 2012
- Richard Cork, Tom Flynn ‘CONFLUX: SEAN HENRY AT SALISBURY CATHEDRAL’ Scala Publishers UK, 72 p, 330 x 250 mm, 2011
- Mark Lawson, Anna Woodford ‘COUPLE’ Inspire Northumberland, 60 p, 260 x 190 mm, 2008
- Tom Flynn ‘SEAN HENRY’ Scala Publishers, UK (Hardback) 160 p, 280 x 240mm, 2008
- Tom Flynn ‘NEW SCULPTURE AND DRAWING’ Osborne Samuel, 24 p, 280 x 160 mm, 2008
- PRESENCE’ Galerie Von Braunbehrens, Germany (Hardback) 104 p, 300 x 230 mm, 2007
- Tom Flynn ‘YOU’RE NOT THE SAME’ Forum Gallery, New York, 34 p, 280 x 190 mm, 2006
- Judith Bouwknegt ‘SEAN HENRY: ITALIA’ Kunsthandel Frans Jacobs, Holland (Hardback) 52 p, 270 x 165 mm, 2005
- Jack Turner, Elspeth Moncrieff ‘HERE AND NOW’ Osborne Samuel, 56 p, 240 x 190 mm, 2004
- Norbert Lynton, Barbara S. Krulik ‘SCULPTURE AND DRAWINGS’ Berkeley Square Gallery, 48 p, 280 x 215 mm, 2001
- Ann Elliot ‘A PILGRIMMAGE’ The Air Gallery, London, 24 p, 210 x 210 mm, 1999
- Edward Lucie Smith, Beatrice Buscaroli, David Hart, Paul Durcan ‘THE CENTRE OF THE UNIVERSE’ Circle Delgi Artisti, Faenza, Italy (Hardback) 63 p, 295 x 220 mm, 1998
- Sean Henry. Osborne Samuel. 2016. ISBN 978-0-9930786-9-9.

== See also ==
List of public art in Surrey#Woking
