= Boyt Company Building =

- U.S. National Register of Historic Places
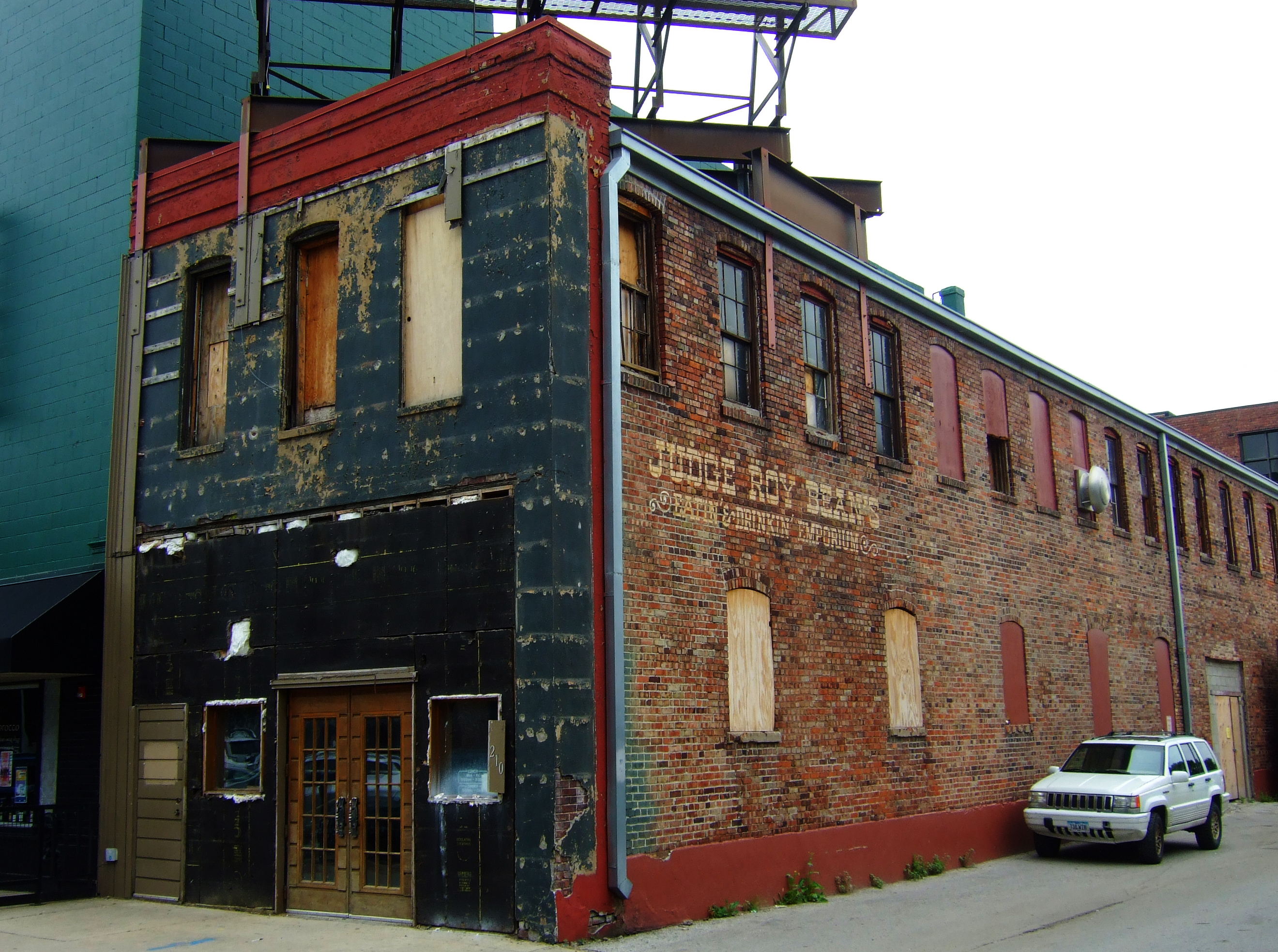

- Location within Iowa Location within the United States
- Location: 210 Court Ave. Des Moines, Iowa
- Coordinates: 41°35′6.5″N 93°37′10.7″W
- Area: less than one acre
- Built: 1904
- Architectural style: Late 19th and 20th Century Revivals
- NRHP reference No.: 09000108
- Added to NRHP: March 10, 2009

The Boyt Company Building, also known as the Gilchrist Building, is a historic building located in Des Moines, Iowa, United States. The significance of this two-story brick structure is its association with the Boyt Company. Boyt manufactured leather goods in this building from 1904, when it was built, until 1908. They moved to a now nonextant building to the west at that time. From 1943 to 1945 Boyt was a contractor with the United States Armed Forces, and they leased this building as a depot for shipping supplies. They supplied leather and canvas goods to the Marine Corps, the Navy Department, Signal Corps, Rock Island Arsenal and Ordnance Department, the Army Air Force, and the Treasury Department, among others.

The building was remodeled sometime in the 1910s or 1920s when the brick, including its simple cornice, was covered with stucco. It was remodeled again in 1980 when vertical wood siding was placed over the stucco. The building, along with the alley that connected it with Boyt's nonextant building, was listed on the National Register of Historic Places in 2009.
