= Dorking Cockerel =

Sculpture in Dorking, England

Coordinates: 51°14′08.6″N 0°19′20.5″W

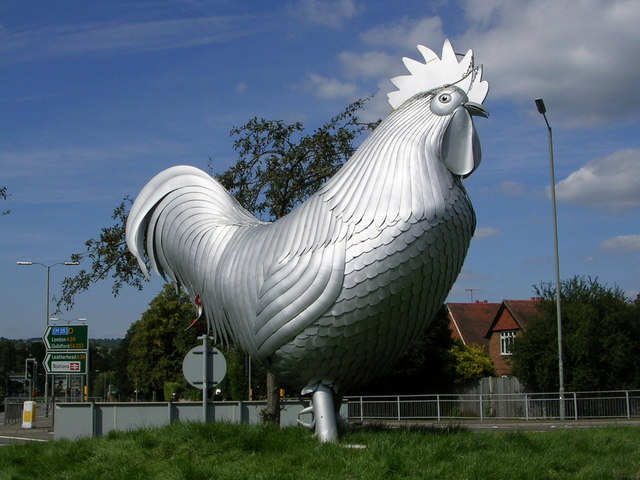
The cockerel

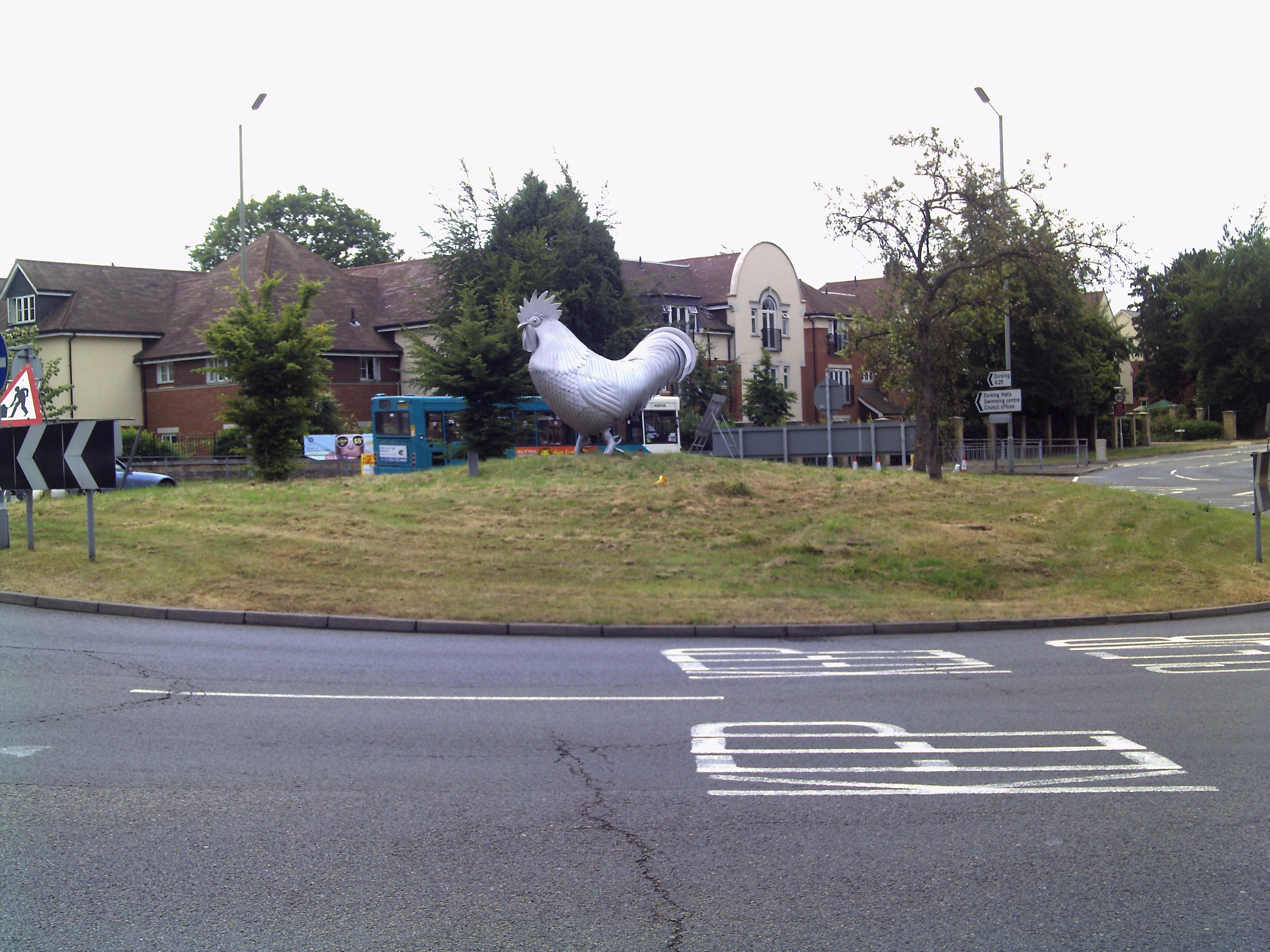
In roundabout setting

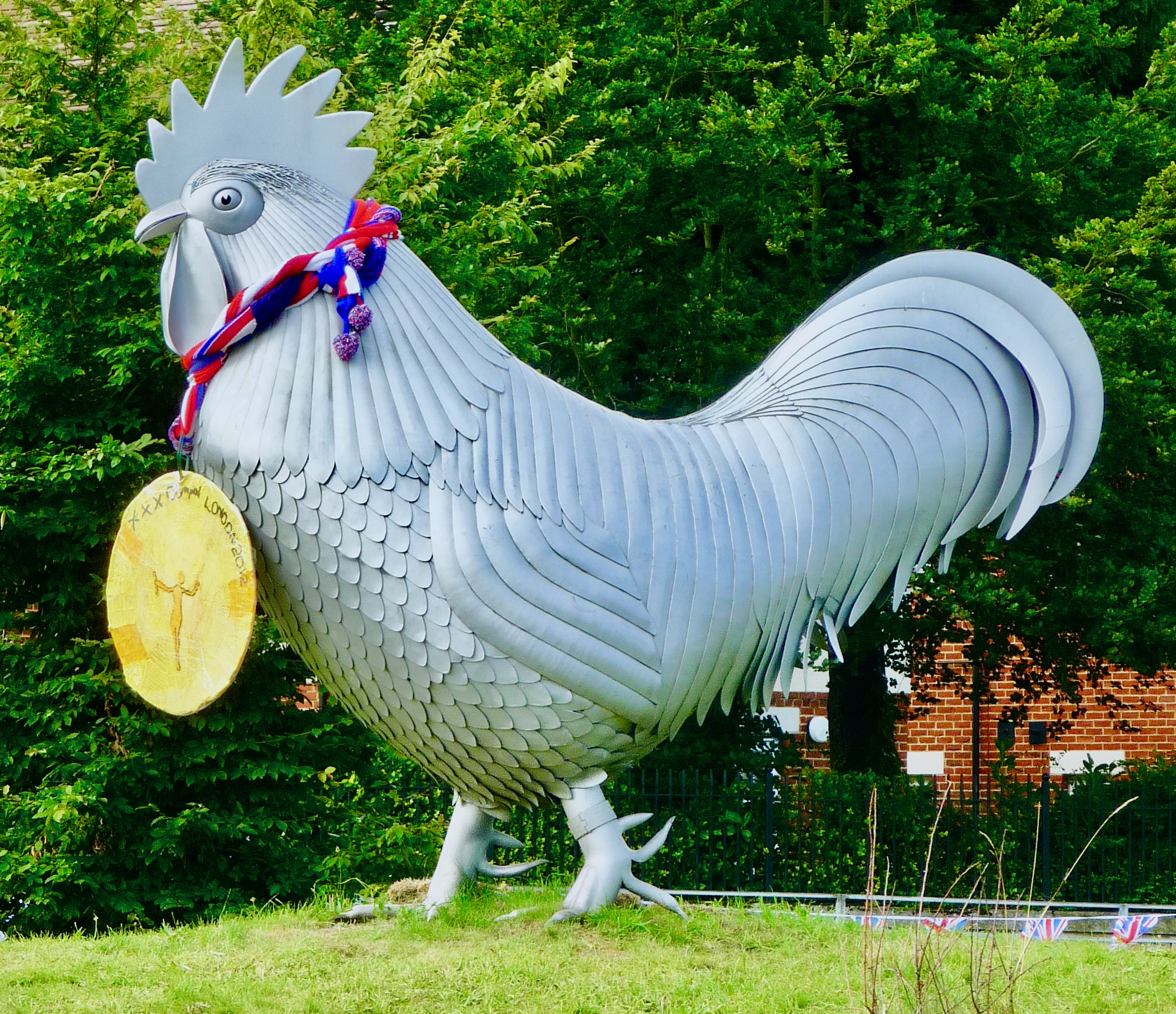
With gold medal during the 2012 London Olympics

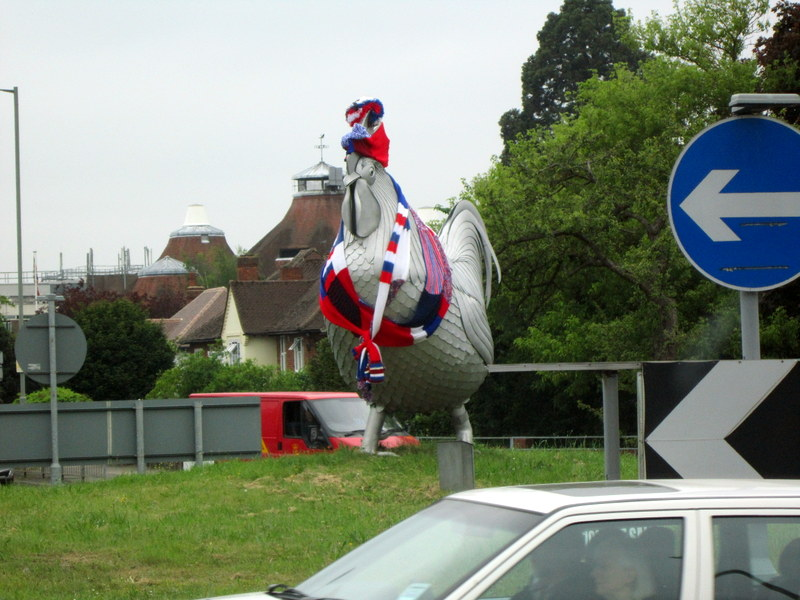
With knitwear

The Dorking Cockerel is a sculpture on Deepdene roundabout in Dorking, Surrey, England. It depicts a male Dorking chicken, which were historically an important part of the town's economy. The 3-metre (10 ft) tall cockerel was sculpted by Peter Parkinson and erected in 2007. The sculpture is a local landmark and has been subject to guerrilla knitting campaigns to mark special occasions.

== Commissioning and erection ==
The town of Dorking in Surrey, has a long connection with the poultry trade. The Dorking chicken was bred locally and sold to London consumers. The chicken is a popular local symbol and has featured in the logos of local clubs and societies, including Dorking Wanderers F.C., and on road signs. Dorking councillor Neil Maltby proposed that the town commission a piece of modern art to sit in Deepdene roundabout and represent the town, and a cockerel was decided upon.

The sculpture was created by Peter Parkinson of the Fire and Iron Gallery in nearby Leatherhead. He built an extension to his house to allow him to work on the sculpture indoors. It was modelled on Glen Two, a former exhibition and stud cockerel, owned by local poultry breeder Lana Gazder. It includes the distinctive fifth toe of the Dorking breed. There were some difficulties in the process, as Glen Two was moulting at the time and had lost his tail feathers. The sculpture took eight months to build and was erected in the roundabout on 5 February 2007. There was some opposition to the statue during its design and construction, but it has since become a popular local landmark.

== Decoration ==
The sculpture is the subject of frequent guerrilla knitting operations. A local group, based out of knitting shop The Fluff-a-Torium, are responsible. The cockerel is dressed with knitted decorations to mark holidays and festivals, including a heart for Valentine's Day, a bonnet and egg for Easter and a red coat and Santa hat for Christmas. The sculpture has also been dressed to reflect current events, including a crown for Elizabeth II's 90th birthday, a gold medal during the 2012 London Olympics, a mask during the COVID-19 pandemic, baby shoes to mark the birth of Prince George, and a floral crown to mark the wedding of Prince Harry and Meghan Markle. To mark the visit of comedian Lee Mack to the town to perform a comedy gig, the sculpture received a knitted traffic cone on its head.
