= Thomas Cubitt =

Master builder in London

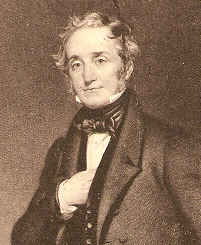
- Born: 25 February 1788; Buxton, Norfolk, England
- Died: 20 December 1855 (aged 67); Denbies, Surrey, England
- Occupation: Architect
- Practice: Cubitts
- Buildings: The London Institution; Buckingham Palace; Osborne House
- Projects: Belgrave Square; Lowndes Square; Chesham Place; Gordon Square; Tavistock Square; Eccleston Square
- Design: Eaton Square; Battersea Park

Thomas Cubitt (25 February 1788 – 20 December 1855) was a British master builder, notable for his employment in developing many of the historic streets and squares of London, especially in Belgravia, Pimlico (Note: Both of these for clients of the senior, noble, Grosvenors (with titles named after Westminster), by the end of the century a dukedom) and Bloomsbury. (Note: For clients of the senior, noble, Russells (with title Duke of Bedford))

== Background ==
The son of a Norfolk carpenter, he journeyed to India as a ship's carpenter, from which he earned sufficient funds to start his own building firm in 1810 on Gray's Inn Road, London, where he was one of the first builders to have a 'modern' system of employing all the trades under his own management.

== Work ==
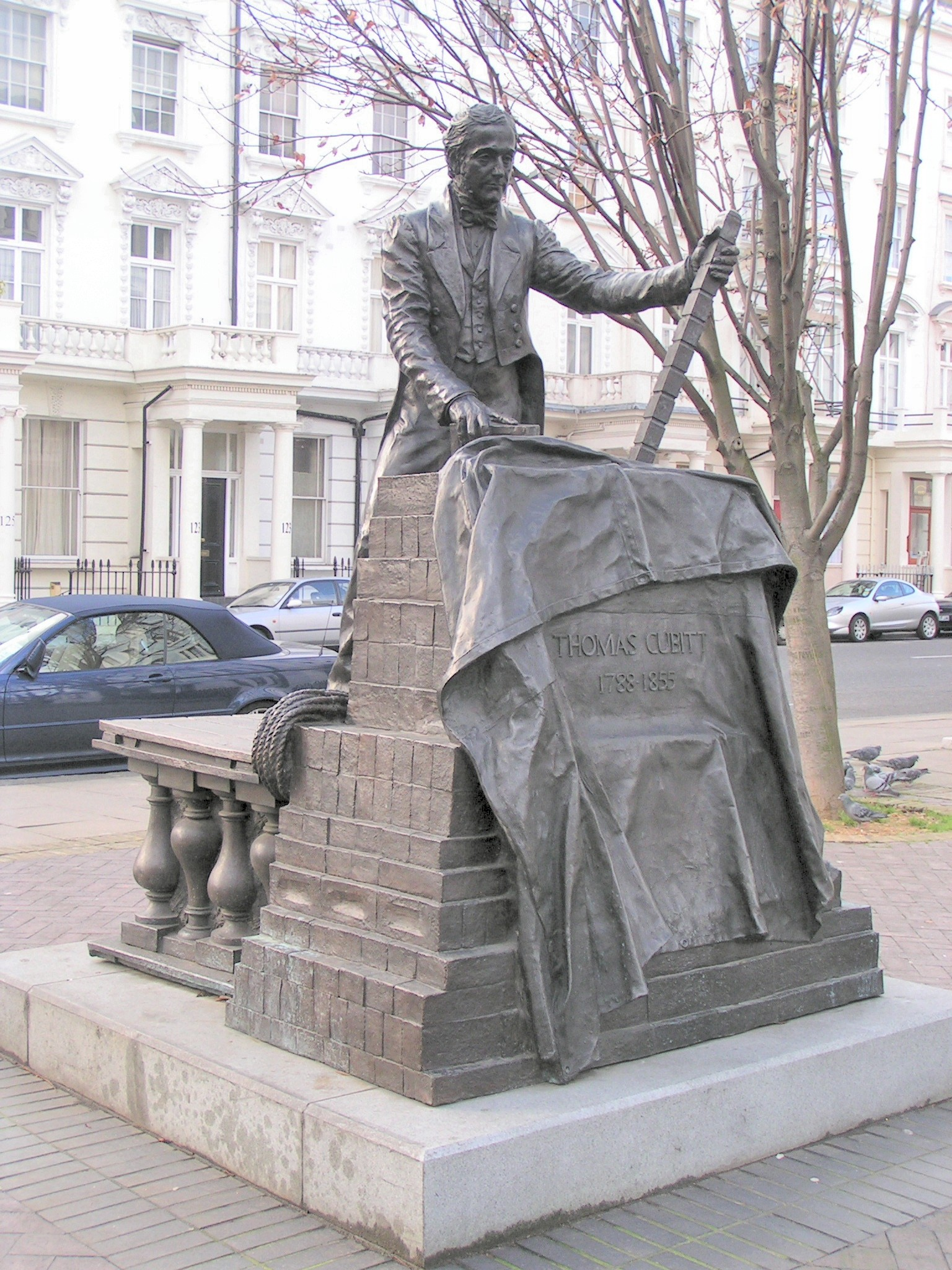
Statue of Thomas Cubitt by William Fawke, 1995. Denbigh Street, London. The twin to this statue is in Dorking, Surrey.

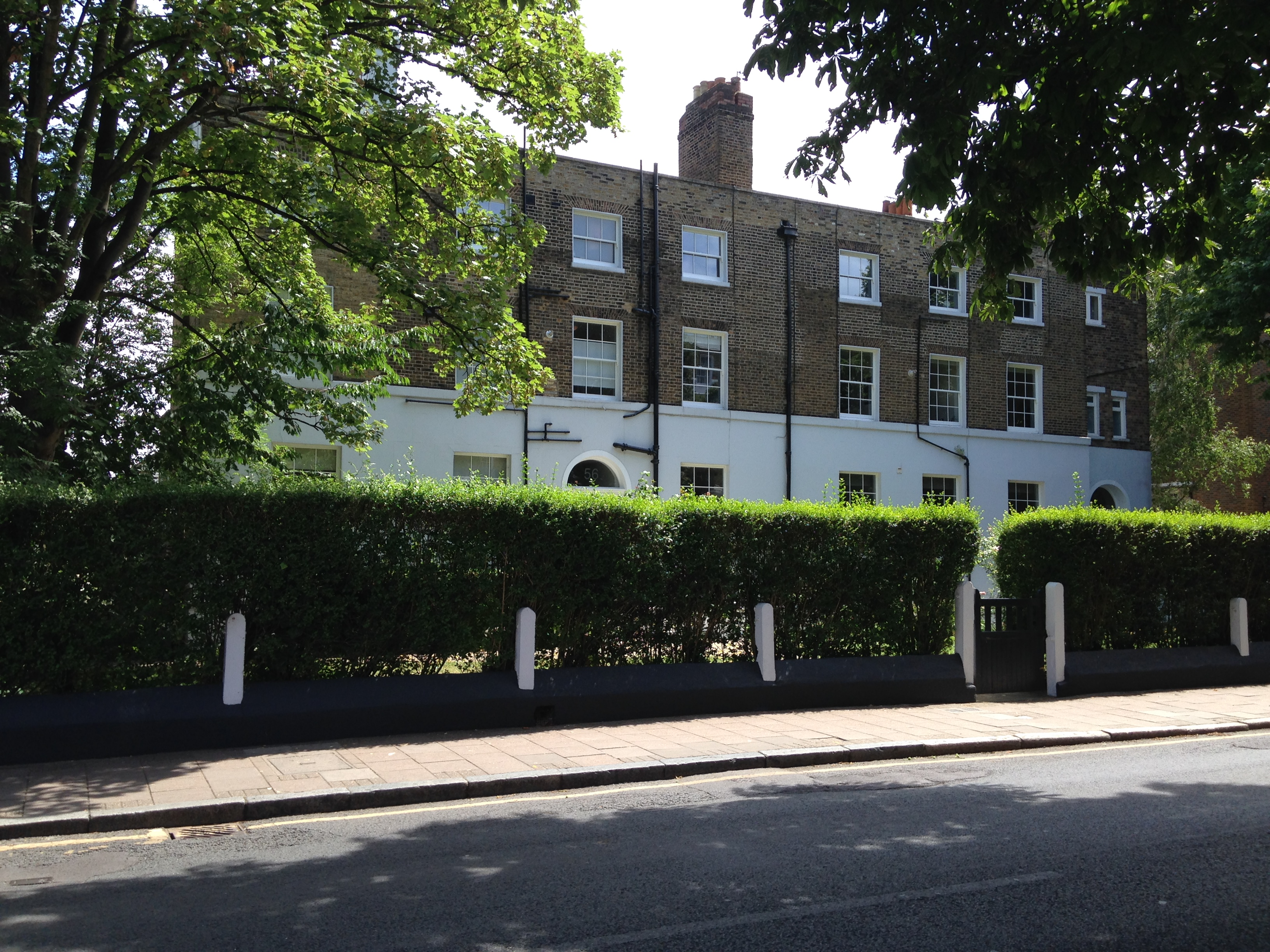
54–56 Highbury Park, Islington, last remaining of Cubitt's villas

Cubitt's first major building was the London Institution in Finsbury Circus, built in 1815. After this he worked primarily on speculative housing at Camden Town, Islington, and especially at Highbury Park, Stoke Newington.

His development of areas of Bloomsbury, including Gordon Square and Tavistock Square, began in 1820, for a group of landowners including the Duke of Bedford.

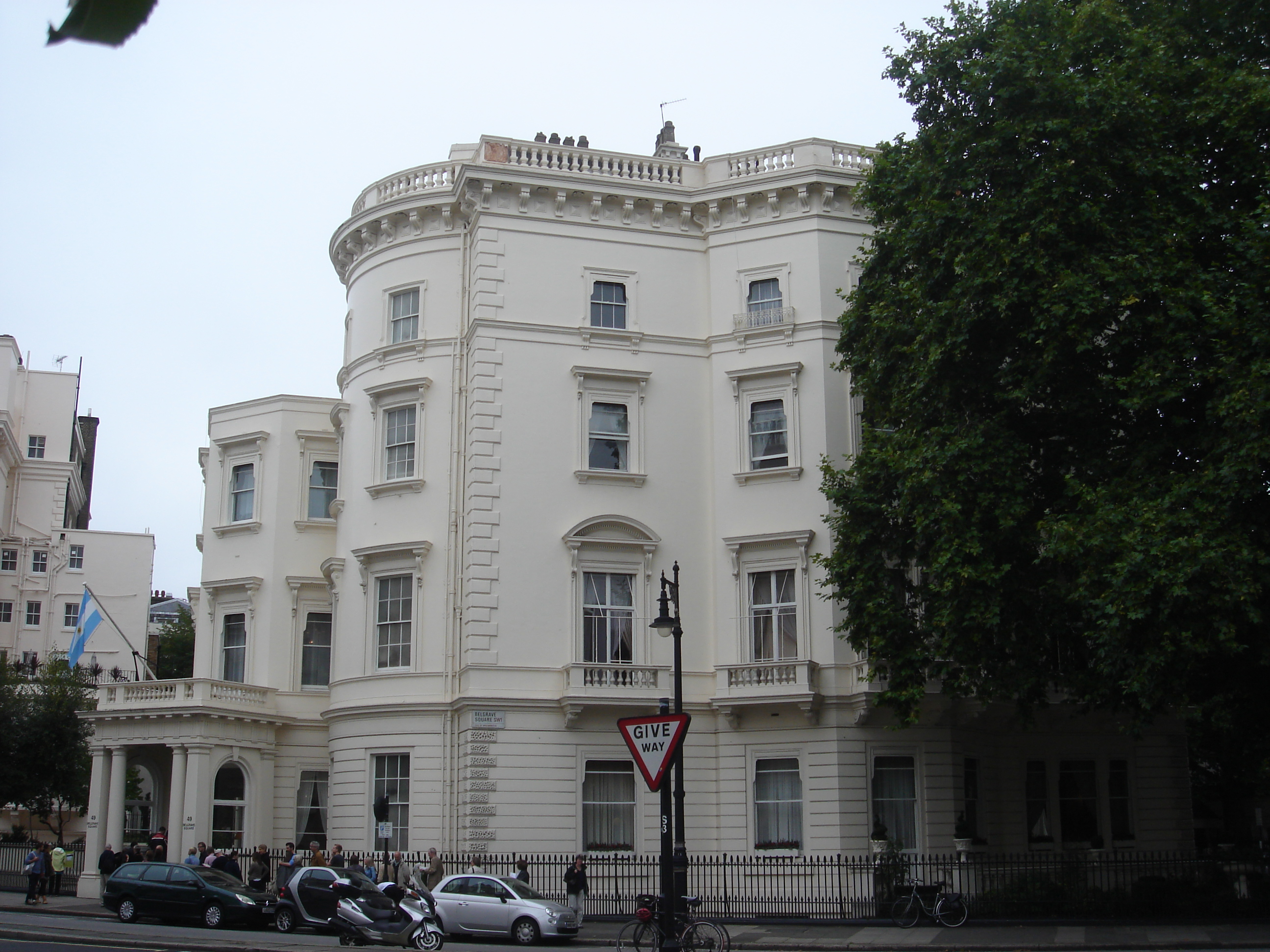
House built by Cubitt at 49 Belgrave Square, London

Cubitt's work outside London includes the country house Polesden Lacey, near Dorking, Surrey, which he rebuilt to largely its present form in the early 1820s.

He was commissioned in 1824 by Richard Grosvenor, 2nd Marquess of Westminster, to create a great swathe of building in Belgravia centred on Belgrave Square and Pimlico, in what was to become his greatest achievement in London. Notable amongst this development are the north and west sides of Eaton Square, which exemplify Cubitt's style of building and design.

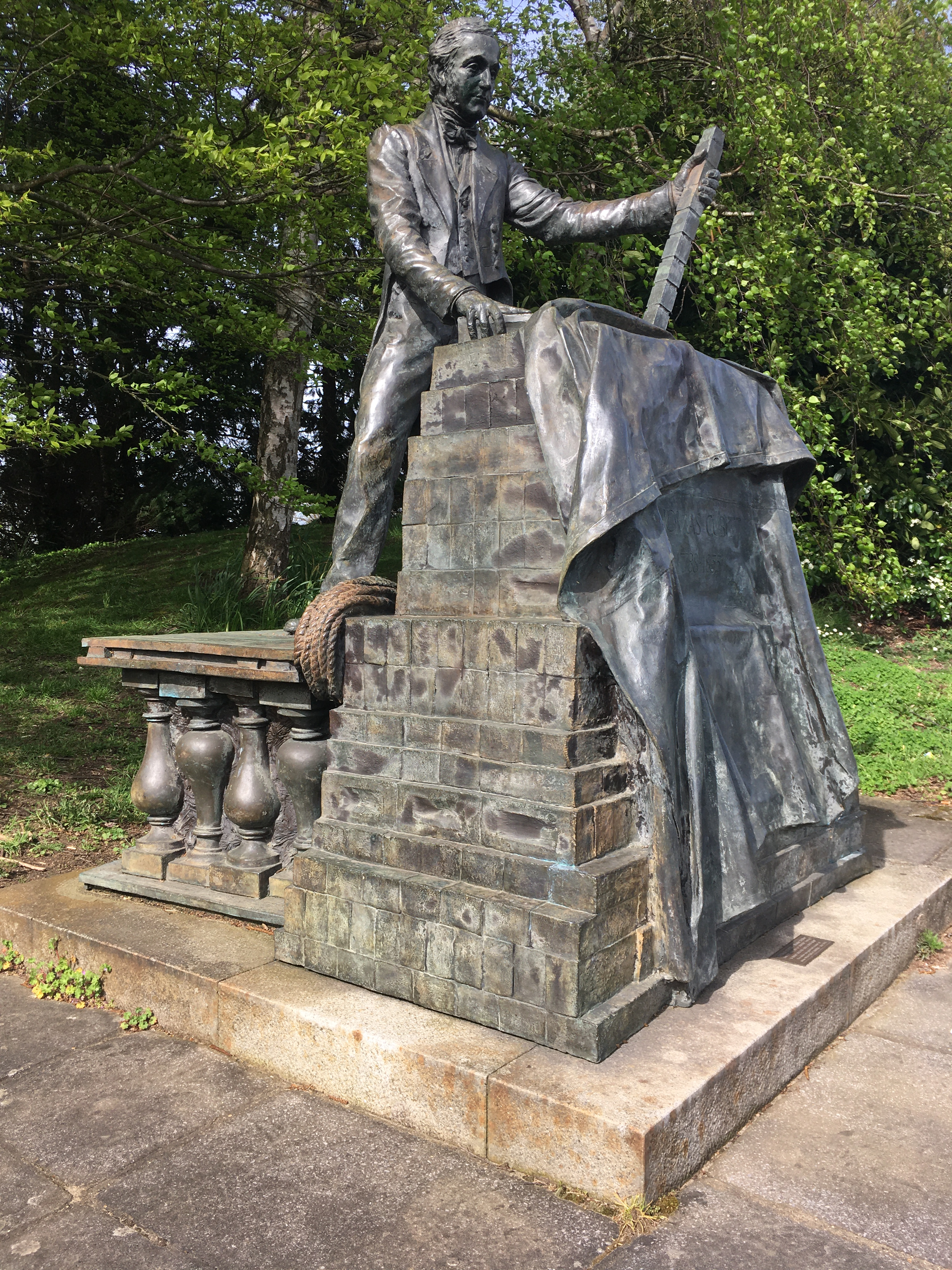
Statue of Thomas Cubitt by William Fawke, in Reigate Road, Dorking

After Cubitt's workshops in Thames Bank were destroyed by fire, he remarked "Tell the men they shall be at work within a week, and I will subscribe £600 towards buying them new tools."

Cubitt was employed in the large development of Kemp Town in Brighton. His public works included the provision of public parks, including being an organiser of the Battersea Park Scheme.

In 1827 he withdrew from the management of his Gray's Inn Road concern leaving this to his brother William Cubitt; the firm of Cubitts still carried out the work of Thomas Cubitt and the change robbed neither partner of the credit for their work.

Between 1845 and 1851, together with Prince Albert, Cubitt designed and built Osborne House on the Isle of Wight, completed in 1851. At the same time, between 1847 and 1850, he was responsible for the new east front of Buckingham Palace.

In the 1850s, Cubitt built and personally funded a thousand yards (nearly one kilometre) of the Thames Embankment.

== Family ==
Cubitt had two brothers, the contractor and politician William and the civil engineer Lewis who designed many houses built by Thomas.

Cubitt married Mary Anne Warner (1802–1880), on 25 March 1821 in the church of St Marylebone and they had at least twelve children – Anne (1820), Mary (1821), Emily (1823), George (1828), Sophia (1830), Fanny (1832), William (1834), Lucy (1835), Caroline (1837), Arthur (1840), and twins Thomas and Charles (1842), although five children predeceased their father. George became a politician, created Baron Ashcombe in 1892. Mary, later Mrs Parker, was a botanist whose botanical specimens are held at the Royal Botanical Gardens, Kew.

Thomas through his son, George, is a great-great-great-grandfather of Queen Camilla.

== Legacy ==
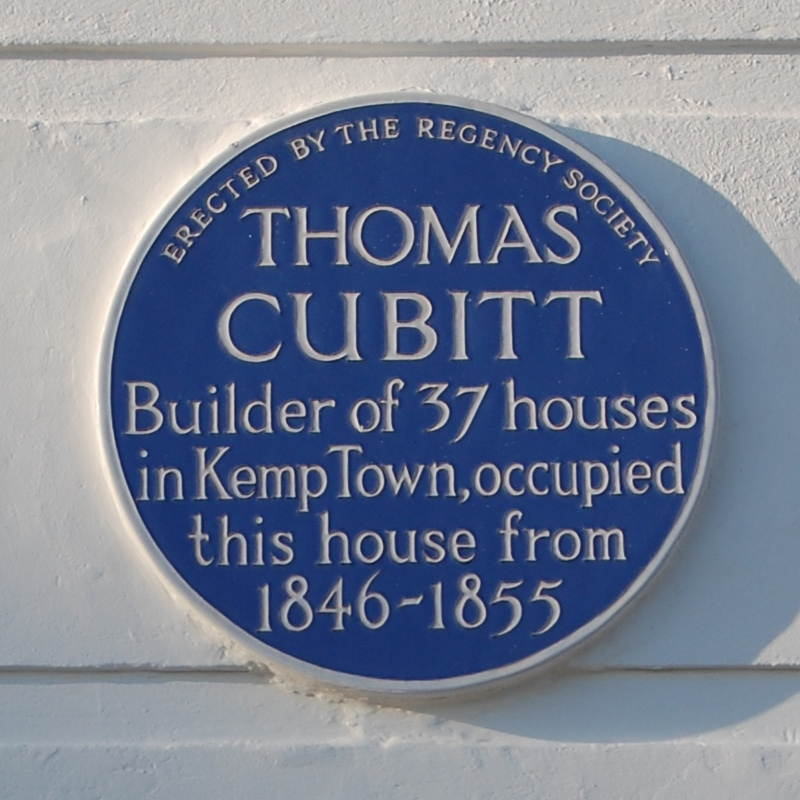
Plaque on Cubitt's house at 13 Lewes Crescent, Kemp Town, Brighton

Cubitt died in 1855 and was taken from Dorking for burial at West Norwood Cemetery on 27 December 1855.

After his death, Queen Victoria said, "In his sphere of life, with the immense business he had in hand, he is a real national loss. A better, kindhearted or more simple, unassuming man never breathed."

As well as the statue in Denbigh Street, London, another of Cubitt can be seen in Dorking, opposite the Dorking Halls, as he was favoured there for his architecture on his Denbies estate.

In 1883 the business was acquired by Holland & Hannen, a leading competitor, which combination became known as Holland & Hannen and Cubitts, later Holland, Hannen & Cubitts.

Restaurants, pubs and other places have been named in his honour.

== References and footnotes ==
Footnotes

Citations
