= Woking Park =

Leisure complex in Woking, Surrey, England

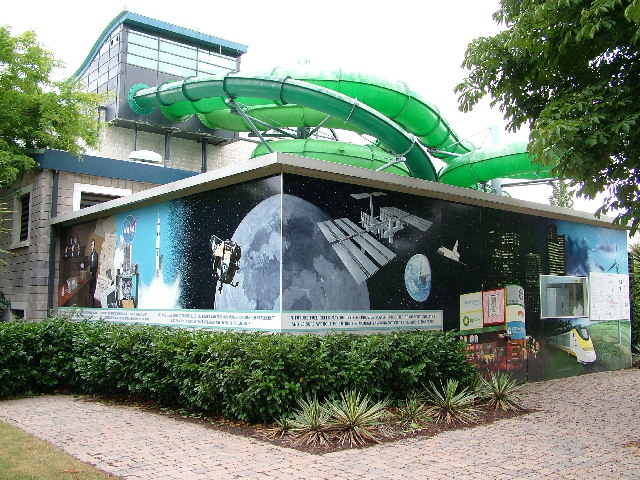
- The Fuel Cell in Woking Park
- Interactive map of Woking Park
- Location: Woking, Surrey
- Coordinates: 51.310°N 0.557°W
- Owner: Woking Borough Council
- Operator: Woking Borough Council

Construction
- Opened: 1902
- Renovated: 1976, 1998, 2011
- Expanded: 1992

Woking Park is a large park and leisure complex in Woking, Surrey, operated and maintained by Woking Borough Council. The park is in the Hoe Valley and will be affected by the Hoe Valley Scheme.

== History ==
In 1902 the Brettell Family and associates, who were known as philanthropists, gave the land to the town on the condition "said land shall not be used for any other purpose than a public park, public walks, gardens, recreation grounds, pleasure grounds, and baths."

The current Leisure Centre was opened in 1976

1989: The main pool of what is now the Pool in the Park swimming complex was opened. Three years later in 1992 the leisure lagoon was opened.

2003: A fuel cell based combined power and heating system was installed behind the Pool in the Park.

2004: As part of a council project covering four ponds in the Hoe Valley area, a major restoration was undertaken to the duck pond area

2008: It was proposed that the Woking College be relocated to Woking park in order to expand. This was opposed by local residents, who pointed out it was in breach of the original covenant gifting the land to the town.

2010: Significant development work began on Woking Park as part of the Hoe Valley scheme. This included the felling of a large number of trees, clearance of waste land, derelict greenhouses and the construction of new facilities.

2011: As part of a ten-year deal with Woking Borough Council, Freedom Leisure took over the running of all leisure facilities at Woking Park.

== Facilities ==
Woking Park has a number of facilities and sport pitches. There is also a large car park near Pool in the Park.

=== Pool in the Park ===
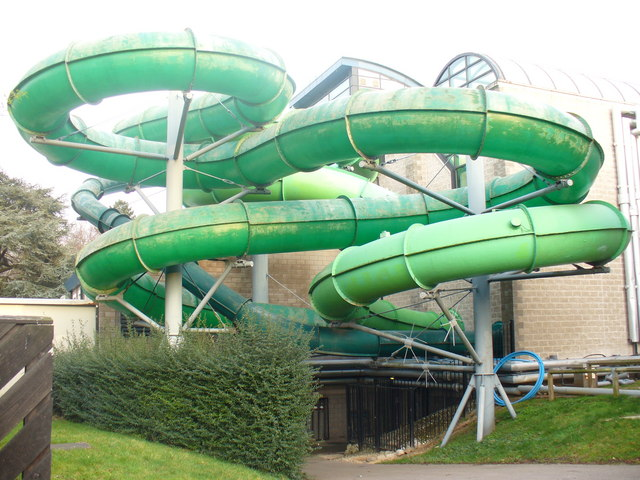
Pool in the Park flumes

Pool in the Park is a purpose-built swimming complex in the middle of the park. It has three pools, the competition pool that is one to three metres deep, 25m long and 13m wide, with up to 6 swim lanes, which opened in 1989; a teaching pool 16 metres long x 8 metres and 0.8m - 1.0m depth and the leisure lagoon which includes three Water Slides which vary in speed (Fast, Medium and Slow). Other lagoon features include a 'river rapids' ride, a wave machine, water cannons and a "mushroom" water fountain. The outside design of Pool in the Park is based on an ancient Roman Coliseum. Pool in the Park offers a range of activities including a comprehensive swim school programme, toddler splash sessions, aqua fitness classes, adults and ladies only sessions, children's activities and parties and is home to local clubs including Woking Swimming Club, Woking Snorkelling, Surrey Aquanauts, Woking Snorkel and Scuba and Woking Lifesaving club

=== Leisure Centre ===
The Leisure Centre opened in 1976 and is accessed via a pedestrian bridge over a small river. It has a number of sports facilities, including 6 squash courts, a new state-of the art gym overlooking the park gym, three fitness studios, a dedicated Spinning (indoor cycling) studio and two halls. The main sports hall is used for badminton, football, basketball, trampolining, sporting events and also a number of non-sports related activities, including antiques fairs, flea markets, and the annual Woking Beer Festival. The second, smaller, hall is called the Wurlitzer hall and houses an American Theatre organ which offers regular concerts through The London and South of England American Theatre Society. There is also a kids' indoor softplay area, called the Pick'n'mix Playstore, creche, cafe, Heatwaves suite featuring sauna, Jacuzzi and steam room. Sensations Multi-Sensory Suite. Many clubs and groups use the centre including weightlifting, gymnastics, martial arts, and dance and drama and the facilities are available for club/group/business hire.

=== Sports pitches ===
Outdoor sport pitches include a football/hockey pitch, cricket square, bowls lawn, and a number of tennis courts. The tennis courts are open to the public (book at Pool in the Park) although they're not floodlit so operating hours reduce according to the time of the year, whereas the bowls lawn is restricted to members of Woking Park Bowls Club. The cricket pitch is only used for cricket games, but is open for people to use at other times. There is clubhouse for the cricket players. There are four new 3g 7-a-side football pitches (opened June 2014) behind the leisure centre with additional parking underneath which are available for booking and leagues.

=== Play areas ===
Near the middle of the park there are two climbing boulders with a spider's web between them. The boulders contain several holds, on which hands or feet can be placed to move the body up the boulder. These are intended for 13- to 19-year-olds, though a lot of other age groups play on them. Use of this feature has declined as the erosion caused by footwear has made the walls difficult to climb. The spider was designed with several features in mind; to represent social mobility within Woking, promoting business and entrepreneurship within the town. Additionally, the eight legs of the spider celebrate Woking's multicultural heritage. There is also a playground for smaller children (Which had some improvement work), a crazy golf course and a skate park which is very popular with locals aged around 11-19.

14 July The play area is currently being completely redeveloped and enlarged, due to open in the Autumn.

=== Ponds and Gardens ===
In the centre of the park is a set of three wildlife ponds with a timber decking viewing area. This was extensively renovated in 2004, as the two existing ponds were badly overgrown and in decay. This involved the removal of 300 tonnes of sediment, and architects Upton McGougan were awarded runner up in the Sustainable Designer of the Year competition in 2005 for the project.

Throughout the park are a number of gardens with commemorative statues (including Ockenden Venture in the Rose Garden and Sir William Robert Grove)and benches.

Wildlife

In the ponds and gardens there are many different types of wildlife-Some rare and some common. In the ponds the wildlife includes a family of swans, about 20 ducks, and many other different species in the pond. There are many other types of wildlife in the ponds. In the gardens there's not a much wildlife. There are many small species that live in the gardens, such as ants, wasps, spiders and flies.

=== Community Centre & Ongoing Improvements To Woking Park ===
As part of the Hoe Valley scheme, a new community centre is being built on land adjacent to the leisure centre. This will including facilities for the Scouts, Army and Air Cadets, Sea Rangers, Girl Guides, Westfield Football Club and Woking Boxing Club, who are currently located in Westfield Avenue. A number of derelict greenhouses are also to be demolished to provide space for new training pitches. Some of the other improvements consist of adding extra pathways, improving facilities there and also adding new ways of access to the park.

=== Firework display ===
Woking Borough Council started the annual Fireworks Display that was held in Woking Park. After a few years the organisation was passed to Woking Round Table who ran it for many years until 2014. From 2015 the Firework Display is being organised by Woking District Rotary Club.

Woking District Rotary Club worked with Fantastic Fireworks again for the 2015 display, described as one of the best displays in Surrey.

As well as the Fireworks there is also a funfair and food-stalls available on the night.

On Saturday 3 November 2018, a giant inflatable slide collapsed at the fairground. Eight children were treated in hospital with seven discharged overnight and the eighth under observation for injuries "not believed to be significant".

== The Hoe Valley Scheme ==
The Hoe Valley Scheme altered parking and provided opened up, accessible walks alongside and across the ravine of the Hoe Stream.

== Boxing, cadets and general sports club facility ==
A Sports Centre, Army Cadets, Sea Cadets and Boxing Club Headquarters moved to Woking Park in the first decade of the 21st century.

== Fuel cell power and heating system ==
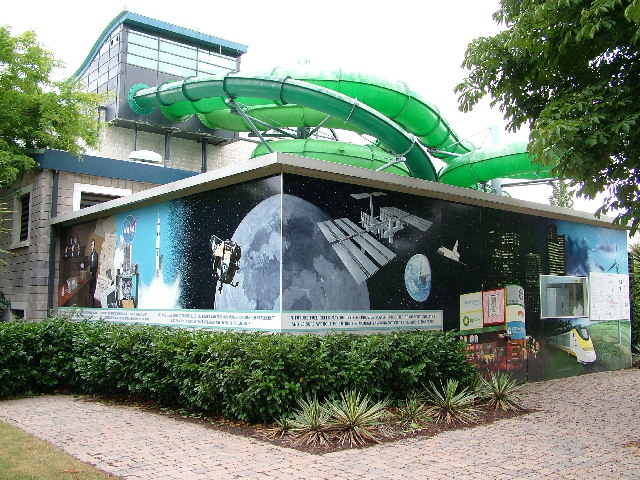
Pool in the Park Fuel cell CHP system. You can also see some of the Pool in the Park water slides in the background, in green

Behind Pool in the Park is installed a fuel cell based combined power and heating system which was implemented in 2003 in a joint venture between Woking Borough Council and Thamesway Energy Ltd which is a company owned by Woking Borough Council.

The system chemically reforms natural gas into hydrogen using oxygen from the atmosphere. When converted to electricity in the fuel cell this produces 50% more energy than conventional means and produces pure water as a byproduct, which is reclaimed for other use. Heat is also produced, which is used to power the pool in the park air conditioning system. This provides for all of Woking Park's energy requirements, is self-sufficient in electricity and is a net exporter of power to other council sites.

The main component is a 200 kWe fuel cell along with four smaller 60 kW units and one 836 kW unit. Total combined heating and power capacity is 1.2 MWe and 1.6 MWth. The system is on display to the public with information and educational resources provided.

Work began in 2001, and was the first system of its kind in the UK. It was part funded as part of a larger scheme to showcase how such technology could be used in the UK to meet environmental targets.

== Gallery ==
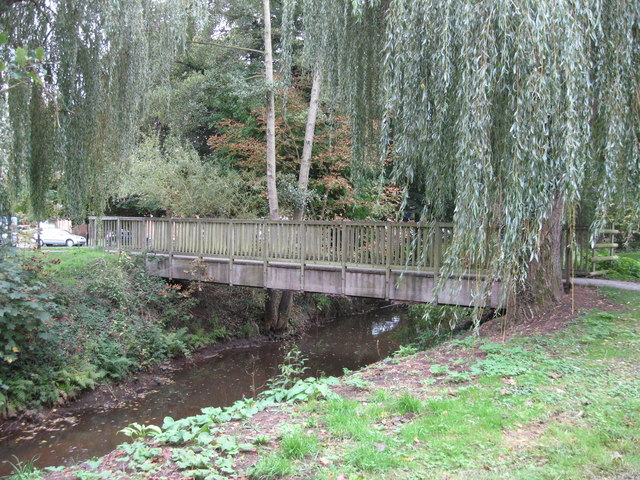
A Footbridge over a small stream in Woking Park

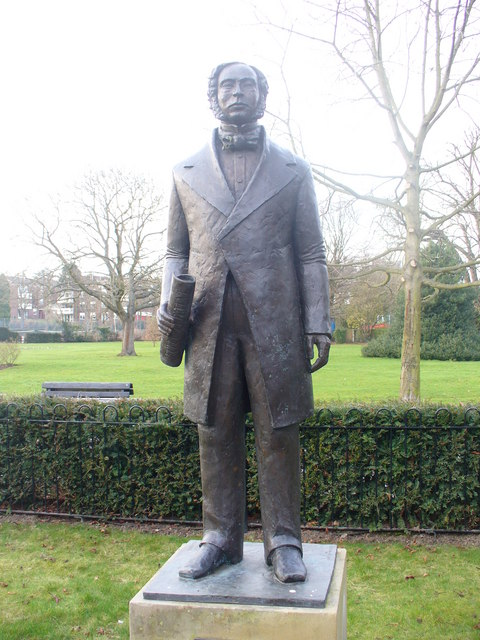
Statue of Sir William Grove

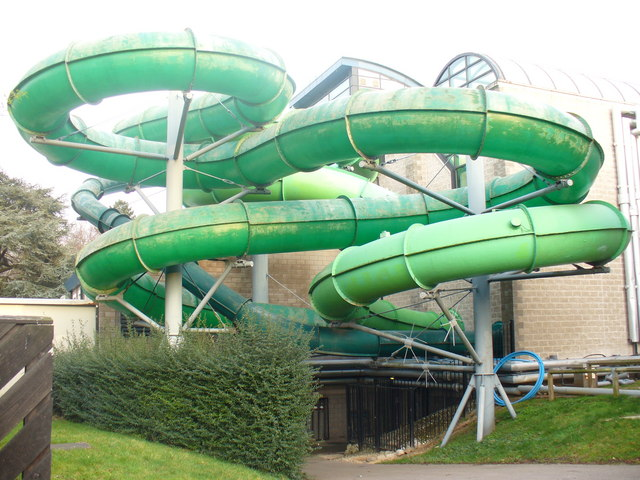
Flumes in Woking Park
