= William Fawke =

William Fawke (1948 – August 2018) was an English sculptor. He made portrait busts, and created several statues by commission.

== Life ==
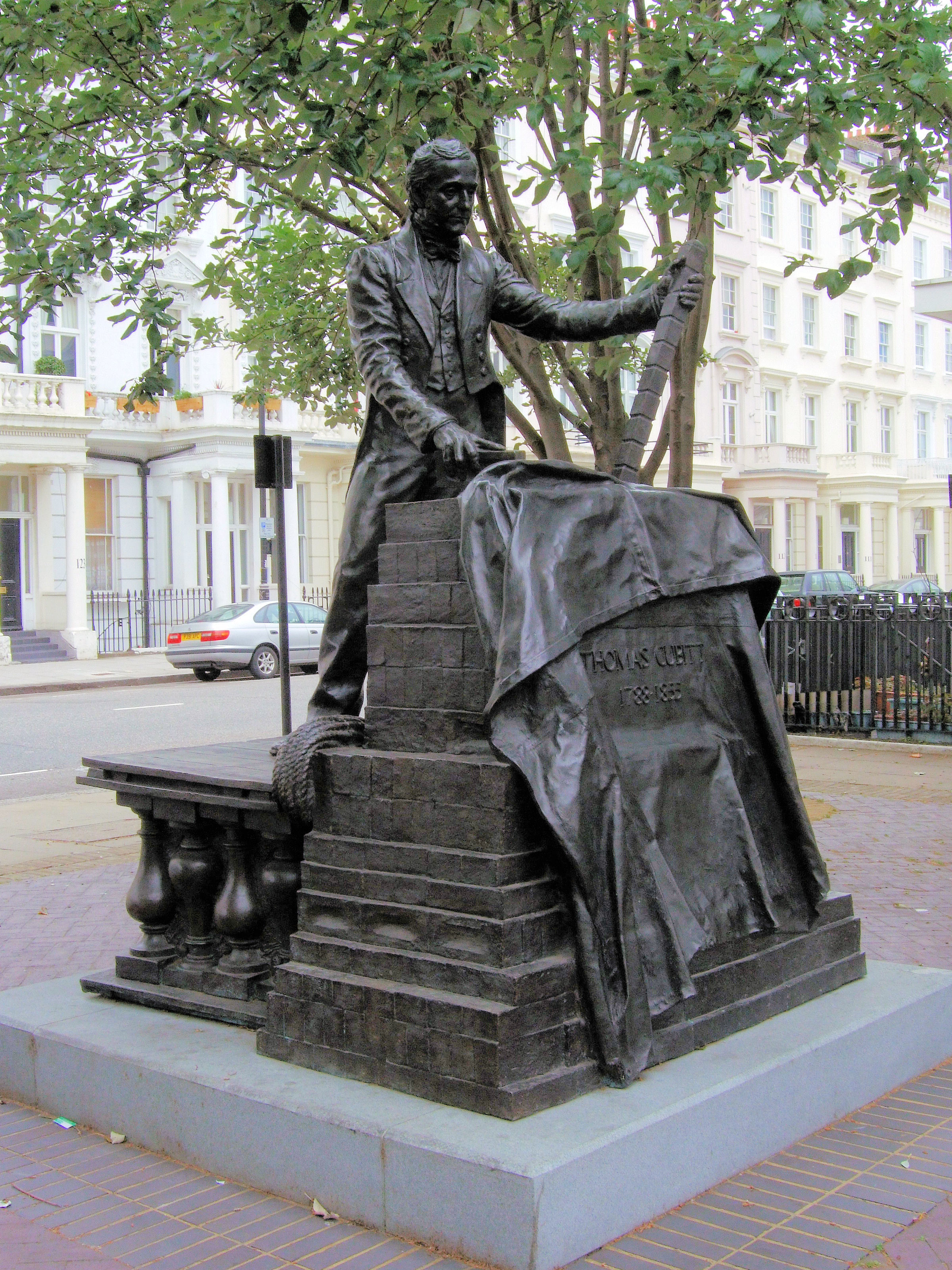
Statue of Thomas Cubitt, in Pimlico

Fawke studied painting at the Heatherley School of Fine Art in London, afterwards becoming mainly interested in sculpture. He made portrait busts, exhibiting at the Society of Portrait Sculptors, and had solo exhibitions in galleries in London. He lived in Chelsea, where he had a studio. He was a committee member of the Royal Society of Sculptors. Fawke died from cancer in August 2018, aged 70.

== Works ==
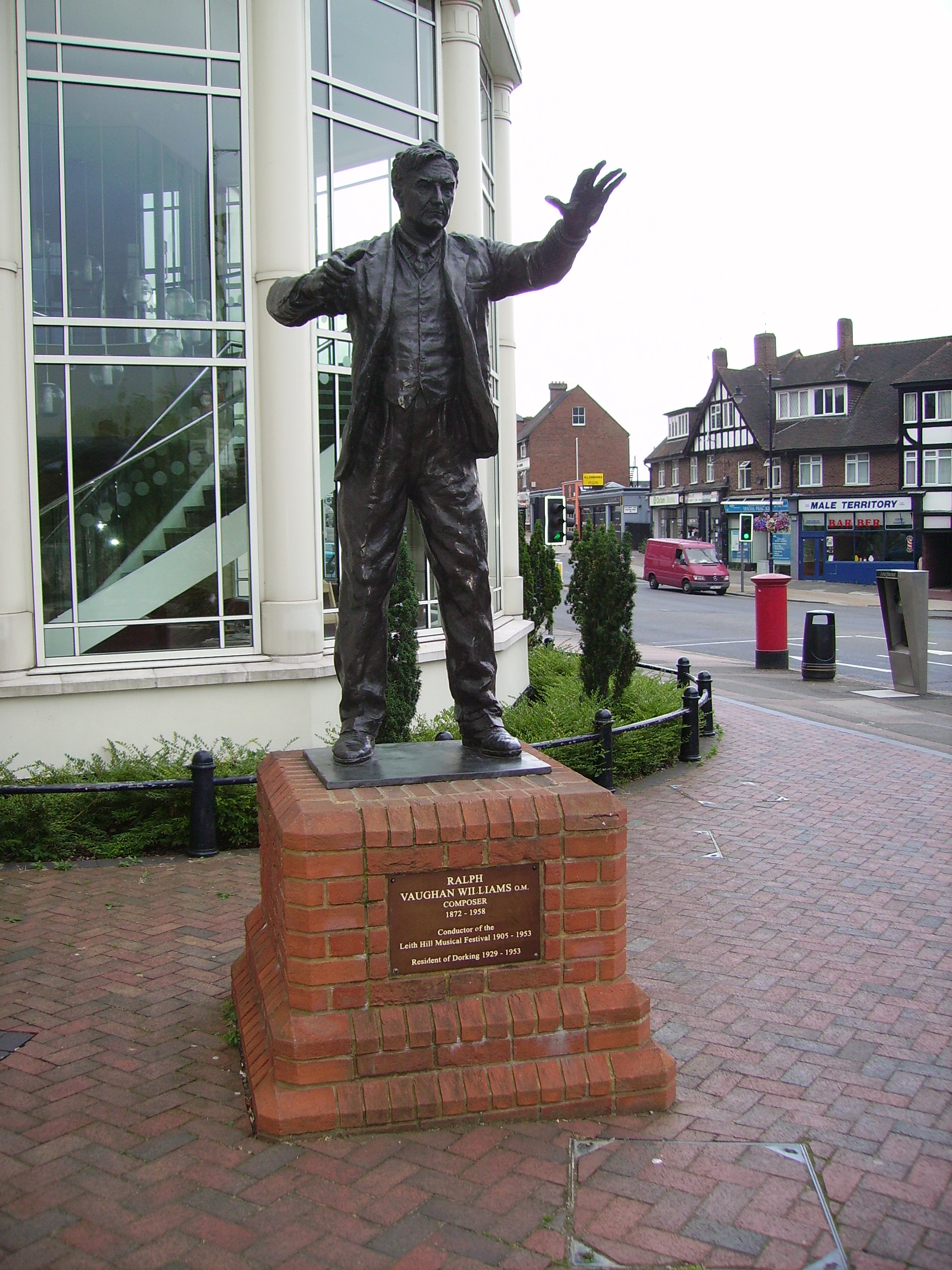
Statue of Ralph Vaughan Williams, in Dorking

His works include the following:

A bronze statue of the master builder Thomas Cubitt (1788–1855) in Denbigh Street, Pimlico, London, was unveiled by the Duke of Westminster on 23 May 1995. It was commissioned by the Sanctuary Housing Association. Cubitt developed Belgravia and Pimlico, and his workshops were close to the site of the statue. A second bronze statue of Cubitt, cast at the same time as the original, is sited in Reigate Road opposite Dorking Halls in Dorking, Surrey, Cubitt's home, and was unveiled in 2000. It was donated by Adrian White.

A bronze statue of the composer Ralph Vaughan Williams, larger than life size, stands in Reigate Road outside Dorking Halls in Dorking. It was unveiled by the composer's widow Ursula Vaughan Williams on 19 April 2001. Vaughan Williams lived in Dorking from 1929 to 1953. The statue was donated by Adrian White.

Fawke also created statues, by commission, of Samuel Johnson (2009) and Tim Berners-Lee (2013).
