= Judy Boyt =

English sculptor

Judy Boyt FRSS (born 1954) is an English sculptor and ceramist. She has created on commission many sculptures, particularly of horses, which stand in locations in England.

== Life ==
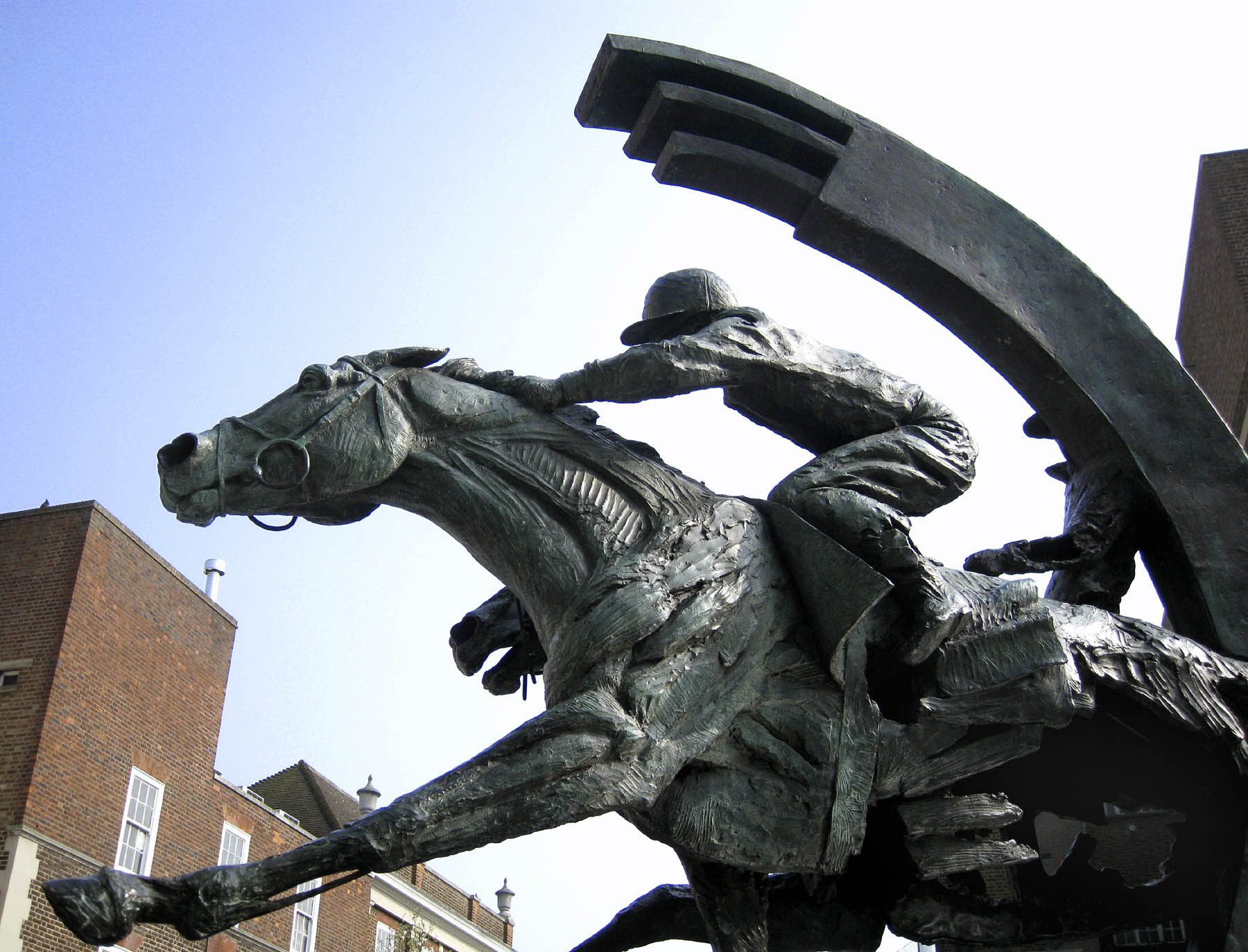
"Evocation of Speed", in Epsom

Boyt studied in Wolverhampton, and gained in Stoke-on-Trent an MA in industrial ceramics. For several years she produced figuative work for bone china and porcelain. She is an experienced rider, and her first commission, from Garrard & Co, was for a relief of polo playing. She has three times won the British Sporting Art Trust Award. She is a Fellow of the Royal Society of Sculptors.

== Works ==
Her works include the following:

"Evocation of Speed" was commissioned by Epsom and Ewell Borough Council to celebrate the millennium. It was installed in Derby Square, Epsom, in 2002, and since 2020 has stood in the Market Place. It is a bronze sculpture on a stainless steel base, and depicts Diomed, the winner of the first Epsom Derby in 1780, racing neck and neck against Galileo, the winner of the 2001 Derby.

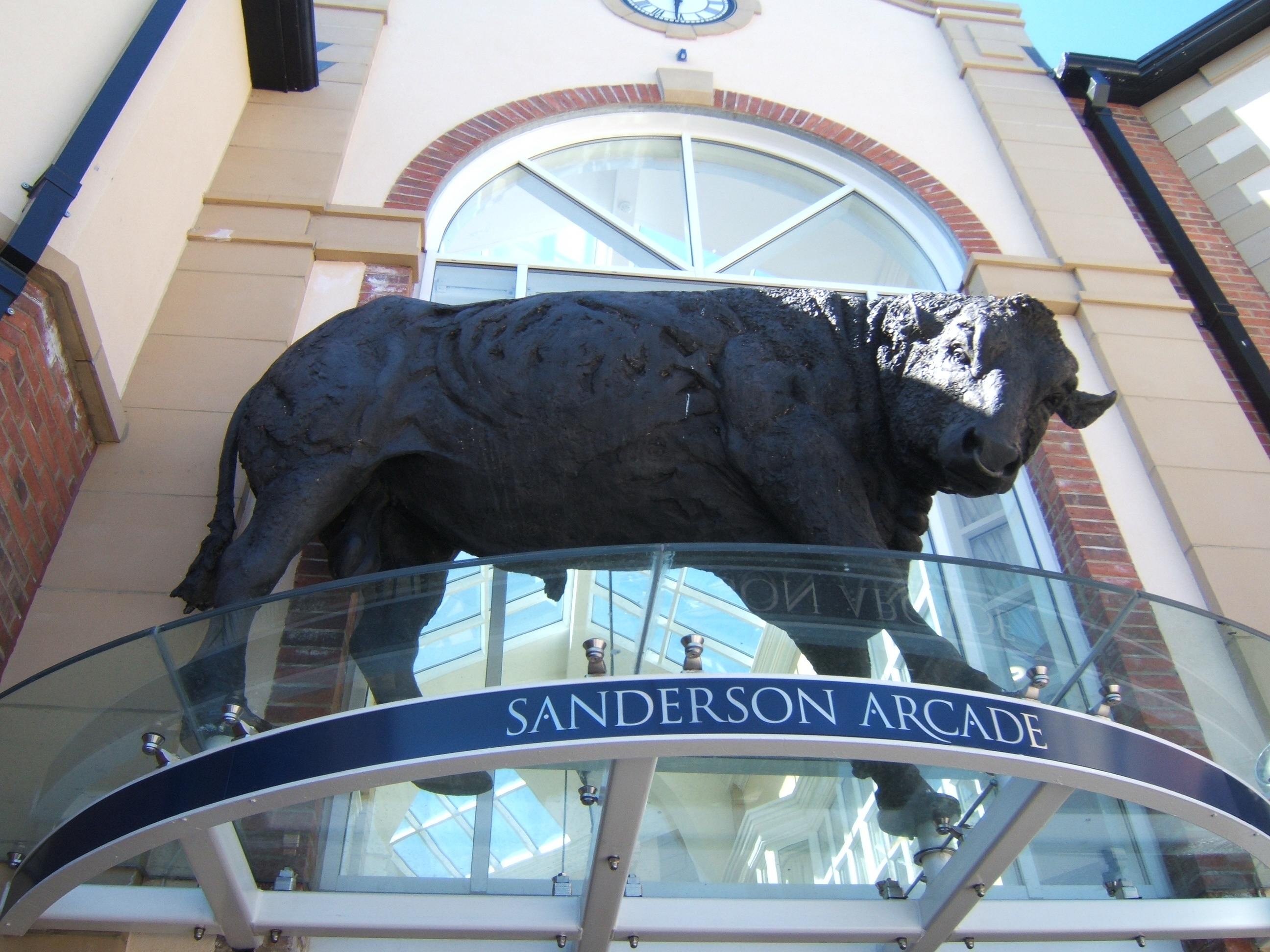
"Bull", in Morpeth, Northumberland

"Bull", commissioned for the Sanderson Arcade in Morpeth, Northumberland, is a life-size statue of an Aberdeen Angus bull, on a canopy above an entrance to the arcade. It was unveiled in November 2009, and is made of fibre glass resin to create the effect of bronze. It commemorates the history of Morpeth as an important cattle market for the region.

"Waiting: The Monument to the Liverpool Working Horse" is a bronze statue of a horse, height 1.8 metres (5 ft 11 in), on the quayside outside the Museum of Liverpool, unveiled on 1 May 2010. Conmissioned by the Liverpool Carter's Association, it is a monument to the working horse, used by carters in Liverpool for more than 250 years, to move goods from the docks to warehouses or to railway goods stations.

"Rebellion" is a statue of a horse in Middlesex Street in Spitalfields, London, commissioned by Standard Life. First exhibited in Trafalgar Square, it is twice life size, and was awarded the RBS Silver Medal for work of outstanding merit.
