= List of places of worship in Epsom and Ewell =

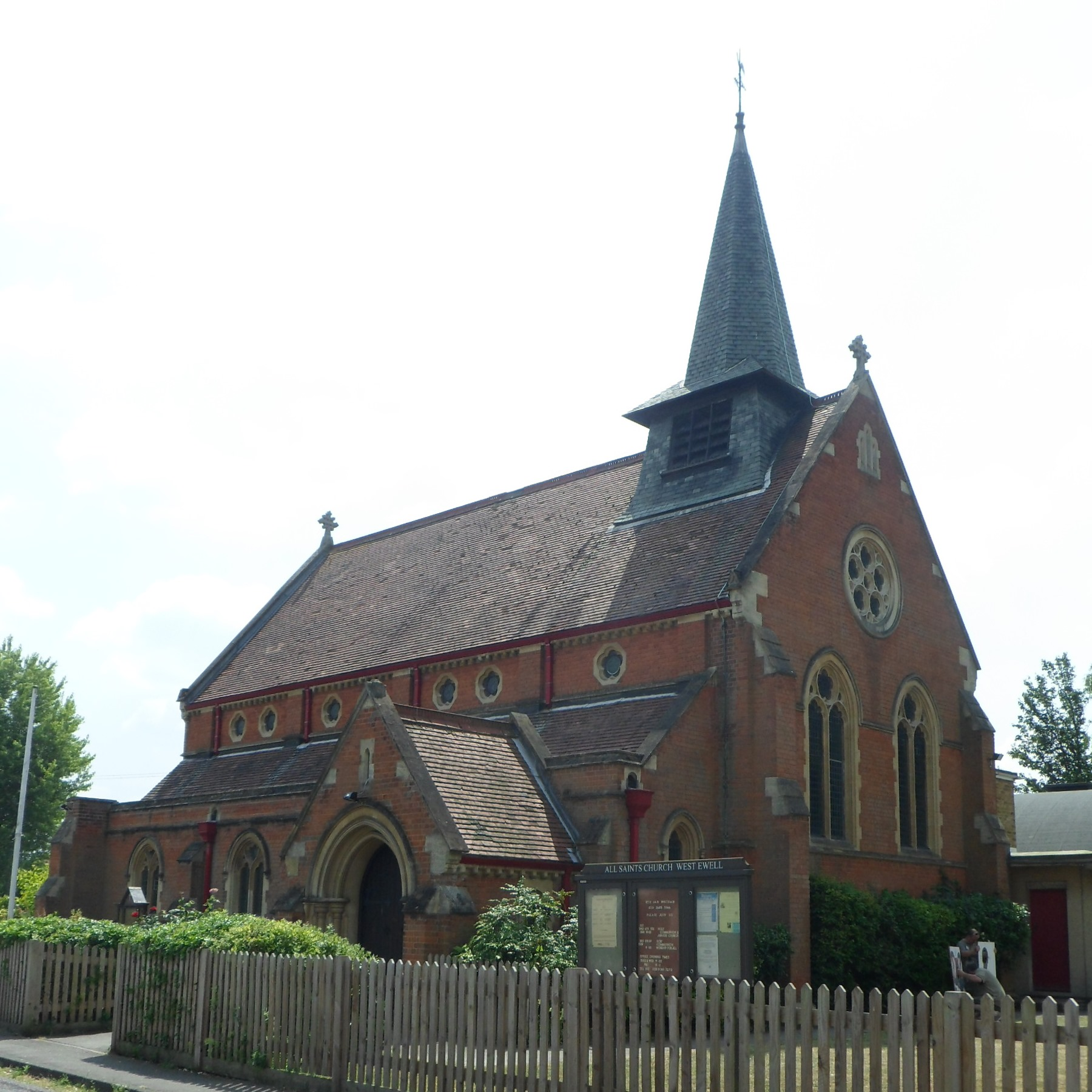
All Saints Church in West Ewell dates from 1894.

There are 29 churches and other places of worship in the borough of Epsom and Ewell, one of 11 local government districts in the English county of Surrey. Another three buildings were formerly used for worship but are now in alternative uses.

Census statistics show that the majority of the borough's 75,000 residents are Christian, and most places of worship belong to Christian denominations. There are significant minorities of Muslims and Hindus as well, and these groups each have one venue for their worship. Many churches and chapels date from the 20th century—a period of rapid population growth in the area, which is just outside London—but the towns of Ewell and Epsom are older and have parish churches with ancient origins.

English Heritage has awarded listed status to four places of worship in the borough of Epsom and Ewell. A building is defined as "listed" when it is placed on a statutory register of buildings of "special architectural or historic interest" in accordance with the Planning (Listed Buildings and Conservation Areas) Act 1990. The Department for Culture, Media and Sport, a Government department, is responsible for this; English Heritage, a non-departmental public body, acts as an agency of the department to administer the process and advise the department on relevant issues. There are three grades of listing status. Grade I, the highest, is defined as being of "exceptional interest"; Grade II* is used for "particularly important buildings of more than special interest"; and Grade II, the lowest, is used for buildings of "special interest". As of February 2001, there were no Grade I-listed buildings, 15 with Grade II* status and 307 Grade II-listed buildings in the borough. The borough council also maintains a list of locally listed buildings, of which there are 65 As of 2022. One of these is a place of worship. Such buildings are of "local architectural or historic interest" and are given extra protection under the borough's local plan.

== Overview of the borough ==
Epsom and Ewell is in the north of Surrey.

Epsom and Ewell is the smallest of Surrey's 11 local government districts: it covers approximately 8,425 acres (3,409 ha) in the north of the county, adjacent to Greater London. The population was estimated at 68,000 in 2004, but the 2011 Census revealed that more than 75,000 people lived in the borough. Clockwise from the north, it has boundaries with the Royal Borough of Kingston upon Thames and the London Borough of Sutton, both in Greater London; and the boroughs and districts of Reigate and Banstead and Mole Valley in Surrey. The largest places are the town of Ewell, which originated in the Roman era, and neighbouring Epsom—a fashionable spa town in the 17th and 18th centuries. Its early growth was encouraged by the discovery of Epsom Salts in 1618 and the founding of The Derby horse race in 1779. Extensive suburban development followed the opening of railway lines in the mid-19th century, and in the interwar the Worcester Park and Stoneleigh areas were laid out on farmland. Further growth came in the 1990s when five 19th- and early-20th-century psychiatric hospitals at Horton were demolished and replaced with housing.

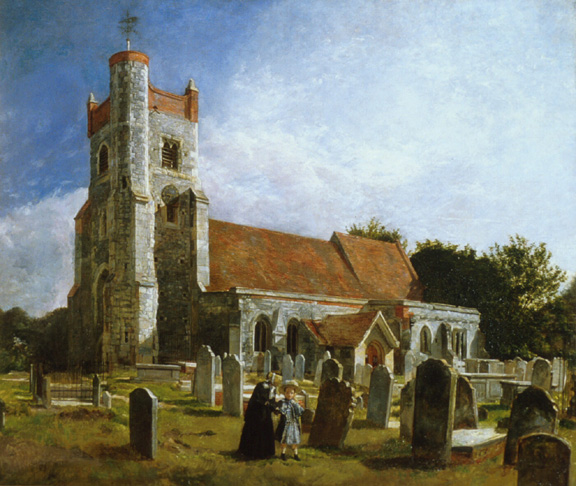
Only the tower survives from Ewell's ancient parish church, shown here in a painting by William Holman Hunt.

Ewell developed from 70 AD around a bend in Stane Street, a major Roman road. It was Surrey's largest settlement by 150 AD. Land in the area was later within the royal demesne or—in the case of the manor of Fitznells, documented as early as 675—owned by Chertsey Abbey. Its ancient parish church, dedicated to St Mary the Virgin, was replaced by a new church within the same churchyard in 1848, but the 15th-century tower survives from the earlier building. Land in the Epsom area was granted to Chertsey Abbey in 727, and the manor of Epsom still belonged to it at the time of the Domesday survey in 1086. At that time there were two churches in Epsom, "but all trace of one has disappeared"; the other, the much rebuilt St Martin's Church, is still the town's parish church. Cuddington, a medieval village near Ewell with its own church, was demolished in the 16th century to allow Nonsuch Palace and its associated parks to be built. The parish name is still in use today, and a new church was built in the Worcester Park suburb in the north of the district. Other Anglican churches were provided throughout the Victorian era and into the 20th century as the population grew: Christ Church, St Barnabas' and St John's in Epsom, All Saints at West Ewell, St John the Baptist's Church at Stoneleigh (1939), St Stephen-on-the-Downs at Langley Vale (1961) and St Paul's at Howell Hill, between Ewell and Cheam (1989).

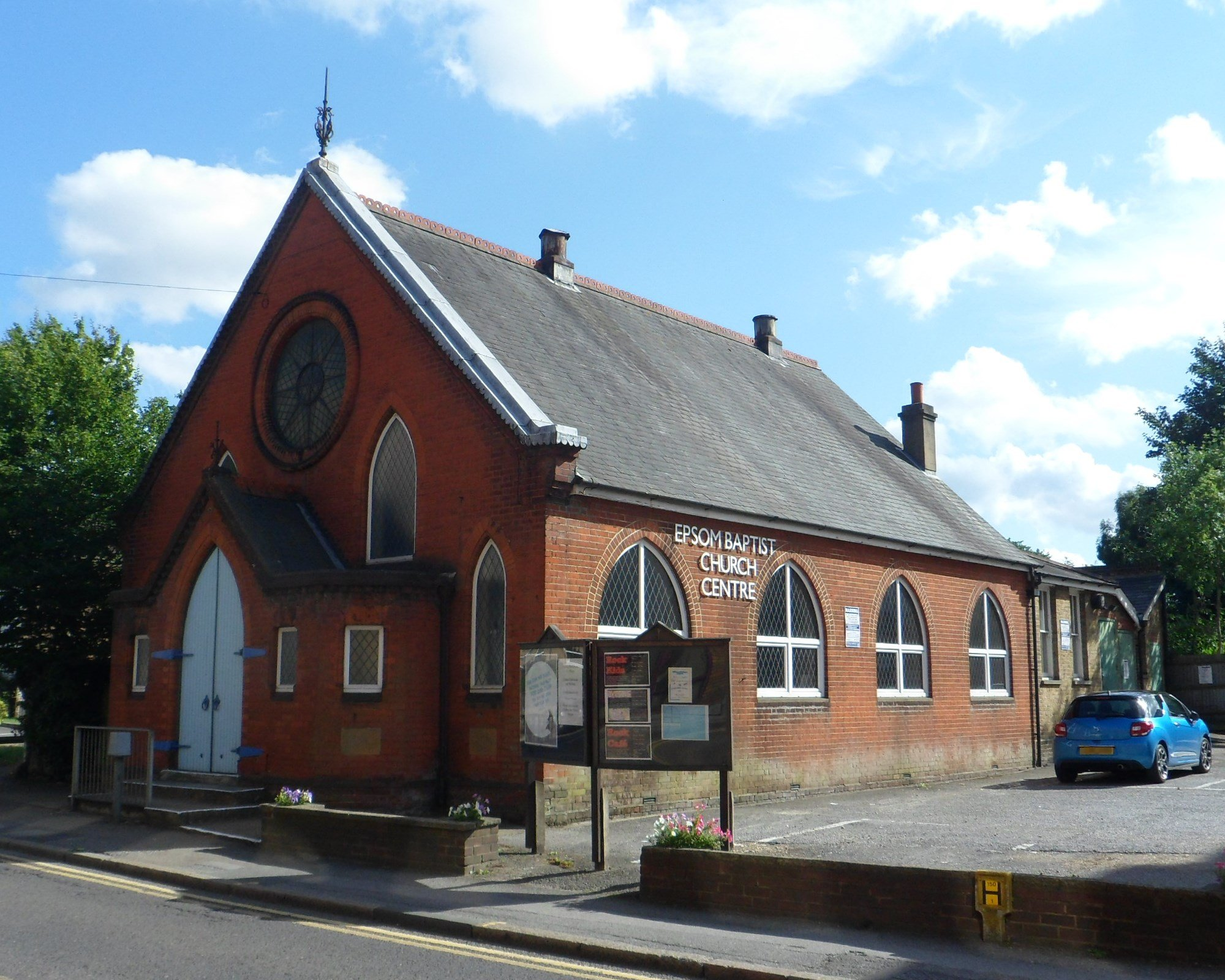
This Baptist chapel was built in Epsom town centre in 1909.

Benedictine monks from a chapel in nearby Cheam were responsible for Roman Catholic worshippers between the early 19th century and 1859, when the priest of the Croydon Catholic Mission founded a Mass centre in a house near Epsom railway station. A permanent church was built between 1861 and 1865 and was rebuilt on the same site in 1930 and 1961 as congregations grew. This was in turn replaced by a new church on a much larger site in 1999–2001. The Worcester Park area became a separate parish in 1906; its church, St Matthias, (Note: This church is over the border in the adjacent London Borough of Sutton.) founded St Clement's Church at Ewell as a Mass centre in 1937. It was parished four years later and the present church building was erected in 1962.

Protestant Nonconformism has a long history in the borough. William Bugby founded Bugby Chapel in Epsom in 1779; he was influenced by famous Calvinist preacher William Huntington, whose early preaching and first conversion of another person took place at West Ewell. The chapel later adopted a Unitarian character, then it became Salem Strict Baptist Chapel. In 1954, after this congregation moved to a new chapel, the building was rededicated as a synagogue—a role which it retained until the 1990s. Illegal Presbyterian meetings took place in Epsom from 1667, or possibly as early as the Great Ejection which followed the Act of Uniformity 1662, and congregations rose to 300 by the early 18th century. A permanent meeting room was licensed in 1724; after a period of closure it was reopened as an Independent Congregational church in 1805. This building was restored in 1846, but a new church was built in 1904. This was damaged by fire in 1961, and the present Epsom United Reformed Church—successor to the 17th-century cause—was completed in 1963. (Note: The United Reformed Church denomination was formed from the amalgamation of the Congregational Church and the Presbyterian Church of England in 1972.) Baptists have met in Epsom since 1899, and their present chapel was registered for marriages in 1909. A Strict Baptist congregation which met at Bugby Chapel from 1899 later moved to a new building elsewhere in Epsom. There was a Wesleyan Methodist chapel in Epsom from 1847, when a barn was converted for the use of worshippers, and the present town-centre building was completed in 1914.

Stoneleigh also has its own Methodist and Baptist churches, both registered for marriages in the early 1940s. In the postwar period, several Evangelical groups opened churches in Epsom and Ewell, such as the Epsom Christian Fellowship, Christ Church Ewell (originally Staneway Chapel) and West Ewell Evangelical Church. Jehovah's Witnesses meet at a Kingdom Hall at Banstead Road in Ewell, and nearby on the same road is a Latter-day Saints meetinghouse. This made headlines in 1977 when a Latter-day Saint missionary was abducted from outside it in a sex scandal which became known as the Mormon sex in chains case. There is a mosque and Islamic community centre in a former church hall in Epsom, and at Stoneleigh a building is used as a Hindu temple and prayer hall.

The borough has an estimated 23 active Christian churches for 79,600 inhabitants, a ratio of one church to every 3,460 people. This is one of the highest in the country.

== Religious affiliation ==
According to the United Kingdom Census 2011, 75,102 people lived in the borough of Epsom and Ewell. Of these, 61.55% identified themselves as Christian, 3.03% were Muslim, 2.55% were Hindu, 0.64% were Buddhist, 0.32% were Jewish, 0.17% were Sikh, 0.35% followed another religion, 24.31% claimed no religious affiliation and 7.09% did not state their religion. The proportion of Christians was higher than the 59.38% in England as a whole. Similarly, the national percentages of Muslims (5.02%), Sikhs (0.79%) and Jews (0.49%), adherents of religions not mentioned in the Census (0.43%) and people with no religious affiliation (24.74%) were all slightly higher than those reported in the borough. Hindus and Buddhists were more prevalent, though: in 2011, 1.52% of people in England were Hindu and 0.45% were Buddhist.

== Administration ==
The Diocese of Guildford, whose cathedral is at Guildford in Surrey, is responsible for all of Epsom and Ewell's Anglican churches. All ten—three at Epsom, two at West Ewell (Note: Including the shared Anglican/Methodist Ruxley Church.) and one each at Ewell, Howell Hill, Langley Vale, Stoneleigh and Worcester Park—are part of the diocese's Archdeaconry of Dorking and, at a lower level, the Epsom Deanery.

Epsom's and Ewell's Roman Catholic churches are part of Epsom Deanery, one of 13 deaneries in the Roman Catholic Diocese of Arundel and Brighton, whose cathedral is at Arundel in West Sussex.

Epsom Baptist Church and Stoneleigh Baptist Church are administered by the East Surrey District of the London Baptist Association, while the Grace Baptist Church Epsom maintains links with GraceNet UK, an association of Reformed Evangelical Christian churches and organisations. The Sutton Methodist Circuit covers Epsom Methodist Church, while the church at Stoneleigh and the joint Anglican/Methodist Ruxley Church at West Ewell are in the Wimbledon Circuit. The Southern Synod, one of 13 synods of the United Reformed Church in the United Kingdom, administers that denomination's churches at Epsom and Ewell. West Ewell Evangelical Church belongs to two Evangelical groups: the Fellowship of Independent Evangelical Churches (FIEC), a pastoral and administrative network of about 500 churches with an evangelical outlook; and Affinity (formerly the British Evangelical Council), a network of conservative Evangelical congregations throughout Great Britain. Grace Baptist Church Epsom is also a member of Affinity. Christ Church Ewell, another Evangelical church, was founded as an independent Open Brethren congregation under the name Staneway Chapel before adopting an Evangelical character and a new name in 2002.

== Listed status ==
Grade	Criteria
Grade I	Buildings of exceptional interest, sometimes considered to be internationally important.
Grade II*	Particularly important buildings of more than special interest.
Grade II	Buildings of national importance and special interest.
Locally listed (L)	Buildings considered by the council to be of "local architectural or historic interest".

== Current places of worship ==
Current places of worship
Name	Image	Location	Denomination/ Affiliation	Grade	Notes	Refs
Christ Church Epsom Common (More images)		Epsom; 51.3346°N 0.2853°W	Anglican	II*	There has been a church at Epsom Common since 1843, but the present building dates from Arthur Blomfield's rebuild in 1876. He used flint and stone and adopted the Early English/Decorated Gothic Revival style. The tower dates from 1887 and contains a peal of eight Mears and Stainbank bells. The four-bay nave has aisles on both sides.	
St Martin's Church (More images)		Epsom; 51.3309°N 0.2589°W	Anglican	II*	Nothing remains of the old parish church apart from some interior fittings and part of the tower, which has been dated to the 15th century. The "oddly composite building" was rebuilt in 1824 to the design of Charles Hatchard in a style described as "Commissioners' Gothic" (i.e. Gothic Revival of the type used in Commissioners' churches). The east end was then redesigned in Free Gothic Revival style by Sir Charles Nicholson, 2nd Baronet in 1904. Flint, brown stone and stucco are the main materials.	
St Barnabas' Church (More images)		Epsom; 51.3387°N 0.2681°W	Anglican	–	A tin tabernacle on Hook Road served as the first St Barnabas' Church. It was a chapel of ease to Christ Church and opened in 1899. Basil Braithwaite gave land for a larger permanent building in 1908. It was founded on 24 October 1908 and opened in June the following year. Locally made bricks were used. Various extensions were made over the years, but the west end was incomplete until Bernard Dowland designed an extension in 1965–68. This was further altered in 2004.	
Epsom Baptist Church (More images)		Epsom; 51.3333°N 0.2630°W	Baptist	–	The congregation began to meet in 1899 in the Gymnasium Hall (no longer extant) in The Parade. A minister was appointed in April 1900, at which point the church was legally constituted, and the present building on Church Street was registered for marriages in May 1909.	
Epsom Christian Fellowship (More images)		Epsom; 51.3340°N 0.2742°W	Evangelical	–	An Evangelical house church began in the 1970s, and as the prayer meetings grew in popularity a building was rented. The fellowship later bought a building on West Hill and converted it into a church; this was registered for worship in August 1984 and for marriages in July 1985. In 1988 part of the building was converted into a school which is administered by the church.	
Epsom Methodist Church (More images)		Epsom; 51.3323°N 0.2663°W	Methodist	–	Wesleyan services took place on Epsom Common from 1840, then a barn was used between 1847 and 1863. A permanent chapel costing £1,300 was built in that year; within 50 years it was too small, so land was bought on Ashley Road and the present stone-built chapel was put up. It opened in 1914 at a cost of £7,700 and has a capacity of 270 worshippers. The old chapel became the Foresters Hall, home of the local branch of the Ancient Order of Foresters.	
Epsom Islamic Centre (More images)		Epsom; 51.3388°N 0.2669°W	Muslim	–	This 500-capacity mosque and community centre is based in a former church hall near St Barnabas' Church. Worshippers originally met in premises further along Hook Road. It is affiliated with the Deobandi movement and the Muslim Council of Britain.	
St Joseph's Church (More images)		Epsom; 51.3296°N 0.2744°W	Roman Catholic	–	Epsom's first Catholic church, designed by Gilbert R. Blount, dated from 1861 (Note: The Victoria County History of Surrey states 1857, but it was not until 1859 that a Mass centre was established in a house.) and occupied a cramped site on Heathcote Road. Building work was carried out in 1930 and 1961 (the latter to the design of F.G. Broadbent), but in 1996 a new site was bought for a larger church. It opened on 12 April 2001 and was registered for marriages a month later.	
Grace Baptist Church (More images)		Epsom; 51.3259°N 0.2773°W	Strict Baptist	–	A Strict Baptist church named Salem was founded in Epsom in 1889. Bugby Chapel was used until 1951, when a "very nicely designed and fitted place of worship" was built for the congregation's use on the Dorking Road. It opened on 30 June 1951 and was registered for marriages in January 1953. A later name was Dorking Road Baptist Chapel, but the name Grace Baptist Church is now used.	
Epsom United Reformed Church (More images)		Epsom; 51.3325°N 0.2612°W	United Reformed Church	–	This church was built in 1963, but the history of the cause can be traced back 300 years from that date. The building, with a curved cantilevered upper storey projecting far beyond the ground floor, was designed by the firm of Charity, Thirtle and Duke; it replaced a chapel of 1904 on another site (registered for marriages in February 1905) which had been damaged by fire in 1961.	
St Mary the Virgin's Church (More images)		Ewell; 51.3521°N 0.2489°W	Anglican	II	The old parish church was taken down in 1848 (except for the tower, which stands on its own in the churchyard and was converted into a heritage centre in 1978), and a replacement was erected to the design of Henry Clutton. Many monuments from the old church were reinstalled here. The building is Decorated Gothic Revival in style and is of limestone and ashlar. There are aisles on both sides, the north wider than the south. The capacity of the new church was 893, nearly twice that of the old building.	
Christ Church Ewell (More images)		Ewell; 51.3488°N 0.2479°W	Evangelical	–	The church now has an Independent Evangelical character, but for much of its history it was described as Christian (Open) Brethren. From 1940, meetings were held at Glyn Hall and in a school until this building was opened in 1955 under the name Staneway Chapel. It was registered for worship in February 1955 and for marriages in March 1956. The new name was adopted in 2002 after outreach work by people from Cheam Baptist Church.	
The King's Church		Ewell; 51.3462°N 0.2620°W	Evangelical	–	Epsom Evangelical Church was established on a site at Longmead Road on the Ewell/Epsom border in 1986 and was registered for marriages in December of that year. In October 1993, a new building with the present name was registered in its place.	
Kingdom Hall (More images)		Ewell; 51.3431°N 0.2359°W	Jehovah's Witnesses	–	This Kingdom Hall replaced one which occupied part of a building on London Road in Ewell. It was registered for worship and marriages in July 1997 and is used by the London, Banstead and London, Epsom Congregations of Jehovah's Witnesses.	
Church of Jesus Christ of Latter-day Saints, Epsom Chapel (More images)		Ewell; 51.3420°N 0.2335°W	Latter-day Saint	–	This meetinghouse of the Church of Jesus Christ of Latter-day Saints was registered for worship and marriages in April 1964.	
St Clement's Church (More images)		Ewell; 51.3644°N 0.2594°W	Roman Catholic	–	Justin Alleyn designed Ewell's Catholic church in 1962, but Catholic worship in the town predates this by 25 years: St Matthias' Church at Worcester Park founded a mission church in 1937. A parish was created in 1941. A landmark on the A240 Kingston Road because of its slim brick-built campanile, the brick and concrete church's walls have an "imaginative" zigzag design with east-facing stained glass in each section. The interior layout was altered in 2003.	
Glyn Hall (Mary Edwards Spiritualist Church)		Ewell; 51.3491°N 0.2485°W	Spiritualist	–	The Ewell Christian Brethren Assembly used this tin tabernacle for worship before the nearby Staneway Chapel (now Christ Church Ewell) was built, and it was registered for their use in August 1950. Since September 2003 it has housed an independent Spiritualist church. Originally called Epsom & Ewell Spiritualist Chapel, it was later renamed in memory of its founder.	
St Michael's Church, The Sanctuary (More images)		Ewell; 51.3498°N 0.2484°W	Spiritualist	L	Epsom and Ewell Borough Council gave the chapel locally listed building status in 1997. It was originally a malthouse, but was registered for worship marriages as a Spiritualist church and sanctuary in July 1954. A marriage licence was subsequently granted in December 1955. It was reregistered with its present identity in 2014.	
Ewell United Reformed Church (More images)		Ewell; 51.3539°N 0.2474°W	United Reformed Church	–	Mary Wallis founded Ewell's first Nonconformist place of worship, a simple wooden building, in 1825. Despite great difficulties (including its dismantling and sale), Congregationalism had taken root and a new building opened in 1865. This was used until 1938, when the present brick church was built on London Road. Another important name in the church's history was Joseph Shaw, pastor for 33 years from 1869.	
St Paul's Howell Hill Church (More images)		Howell Hill; 51.3464°N 0.2255°W	Anglican	–	The church was rebuilt in 1989 and is part of a joint parish with St Mary's Church at Burgh Heath in the neighbouring district of Reigate and Banstead.	
St Stephen-on-the-Downs Church (More images)		Langley Vale; 51.3071°N 0.2643°W	Anglican	–	The present church in this downland village between Epsom Downs Racecourse and Ashtead was built in 1961. Prior to that, a tin tabernacle stood on an adjacent site which is now used as the car park of Langley Vale Village Hall.	
St John the Baptist's Church (More images)		Stoneleigh; 51.3634°N 0.2491°W	Anglican	–	A church hall was the first Anglican building in Stoneleigh; it served as a place of worship from 1936 until the present red-brick church was erected on Station Approach. The tower was built in 1958, a gallery was inserted and an entrance porch was provided. More work took place in 1995 (the provision of a parish centre linked to the church) and 2000.	
Stoneleigh Baptist Church (More images)		Stoneleigh; 51.3608°N 0.2411°W	Baptist	–	Baptists began to meet in Stoneleigh in 1934. A sports pavilion and the local school were used initially, but in 1935 a church hall was erected and the church was legally established on 4 January 1936. The hall was used for worship until 1962 when a permanent church was completed; the premises were then comprehensively redeveloped in 1997–98. The church was registered for marriages in September 1940.	
Sri Raja Rajeswari Amman Temple		Stoneleigh; 51.3620°N 0.2459°W	Hindu	–	The temple, also known as Sri Raja Rajeswari Amman Temple (London) and in the Worship Register as Parasakthi Hindu (Saiva) Temple, is located on Dell Lane in Stoneleigh. It was registered for worship in June 1995.	
Stoneleigh Methodist Church (More images)		Stoneleigh; 51.3659°N 0.2493°W	Methodist	–	A Methodist community developed from 1936, a hilltop site was acquired and a church hall built. It opened on 26 February 1938 in an isolated position and was registered for marriages in February 1941. Houses soon surrounded it, and during World War II the remainder of the site was used for "Dig for Victory" allotments, dubbed "the Holy Ground". The brick-built church could hold 250 worshippers. To meet the increasing demand for space a new church was built and opened on 10 September 1955, allowing the original hall to be used for other meetings. As more space was needed, on 24 February 1973 the "Link Room" was opened, using the remainder of the building plot. The complex is used regularly by the church and local community.	
All Saints Church (More images)		West Ewell; 51.3554°N 0.2656°W	Anglican	–	Ewell's second Anglican church was opened in 1894, although the Victoria County History of 1911 described it as incomplete. It is an Early English Gothic Revival building with red brick walls and stone dressings. On the roof is a small wooden bell turret topped with a flèche. John H. Bridges and the vicar of St Mary the Virgin's Church (to which All Saints was a chapel of ease) provided the land and funding for the church; it remained unparished until 1952.	
Ruxley Church (More images)		West Ewell; 51.3645°N 0.2684°W	Anglican/Methodist	–	St Francis of Assisi's Anglican church was built on Ruxley Lane in 1939 and demolished in 1996. The congregation moved into the neighbouring Ruxley Methodist Church (built in 1965), and the churches joined as a LEP in 2002. A new church (pictured) has been built on the site of the old St Francis' Church, and the first service was held in it on 23 June 2013. It was registered as a Methodist place of worship in July 2014.	
West Ewell Evangelical Church (More images)		West Ewell; 51.3563°N 0.2704°W	Evangelical	–	A Sunday school commenced in a West Ewell resident's house in 1939. Four years later this developed into an Evangelical fellowship which used a school for its worship services. A permanent church was built on the site of a tennis court in 1952; it opened in April of that year and was registered for worship the following month. A licence to solemnise marriages followed in September 1953. The premises were rebuilt in 1990, but the 1950s façade remains.	
St Mary the Virgin's Church (More images)		Worcester Park; 51.3765°N 0.2561°W	Anglican	II	A. Thomas of architects Whitfield and Thomas designed this church in 1895. It replaced the ancient parish church of Cuddington, which was demolished to make way for King Henry VIII's Nonsuch Palace. Mostly of knapped flint but with some stone and brickwork, it is in the Early English Gothic Revival style and has an aisled nave and a chancel with an apse. An extension was added in the 1950s.	

== Former places of worship ==
Former places of worship
Name	Image	Location	Denomination/ Affiliation	Grade	Notes	Refs
St John's Church (More images)		Epsom; 51.3369°N 0.2586°W	Anglican	–	This was built in 1884 near East Street in Epsom town centre. It served as a chapel of ease to St Martin's Church until 1954 or later: it was still marked as a church on the 1954–55 Ordnance Survey map. The brick and stone structure has been converted into a nursery school.	
Bugby Chapel (More images)		Epsom; 51.3353°N 0.2614°W	Independent Calvinistic	II	The chapel is now an office called The Old Meeting House, but it was in religious use for over 200 years from 1779, when Rev. William Bugby founded it as a Calvinistic place of worship. Unitarians and Strict Baptists used it later, and in 1954 it became Epsom and District Synagogue under the guidance of Hans Leo Lehmann. It declined following his death in 1992, and its use as a synagogue ceased in 1994 when the congregation joined Sutton. The simple Classical-style building has round-arched windows.	
Kingdom Hall		Ewell; 51.3548°N 0.2451°W	Jehovah's Witnesses	–	Part of this building, which is now in commercial use, was registered for worship as a Kingdom Hall in March 1958 and for marriages a year later. It was used until a new Kingdom Hall was opened on a different site and registered in July 1997.	

== Former places of worship demolished since 2000 ==
Former places of worship
Name	Image	Location	Denomination/ Affiliation	Grade	Notes	Refs
Ruxley Church (old building) (More images)		West Ewell; 51.3640°N 0.2719°W	Anglican/Methodist	–	This was built as Ruxley Methodist Church in 1965 and was registered for marriages in May of that year. When the nearby St Francis of Assisi's Church had to be demolished because of structural problems in 1996, the Anglican congregation joined and it became a joint Anglican and Methodist church with a new name. The building closed in June 2013, when the new church on the site of its demolished predecessor was completed, and was itself demolished and the site redeveloped.	

== Bibliography ==
- Chambers, Ralph (1952). The Strict Baptist Chapels of England: Surrey and Hampshire. Vol. 1. Thornton Heath: Ralph Chambers.
- Cleal, Edward E.; Crippen, T. G. (1908). The story of Congregationalism in Surrey. London: James Clarke & Co.
- Facey, Roy A., ed. (1981). International Church Index (Doctrinal). Index Publications. ISBN 0-907578-00-4.
- Nairn, Ian; Pevsner, Nikolaus (1971) [1962]. The Buildings of England: Surrey (2nd ed.). Harmondsworth: Penguin Books. ISBN 0-300-09675-5.
- Hill, Roy (2002) [1990]. The Assemblies Address Book (PDF) (5th ed.). Bristol: Christian Year Publications. ISBN 1-872734-25-1. Archived from the original on 19 September 2004.
- Methodist Church of Great Britain (1947). Methodist Church Buildings: Statistical Returns including Seating Accommodation as at July 1st, 1940 (PDF). Manchester: The Department for Chapel Affairs. (Available online in 14 parts; Guide to abbreviations on page 6)
- Stell, Christopher (2002). Nonconformist Chapels and Meeting-houses in Eastern England. Swindon: English Heritage. ISBN 1-873592-50-7.
