= Langley Vale =

Village in Surrey, England

Coordinates: 51.306°N 0.266°W

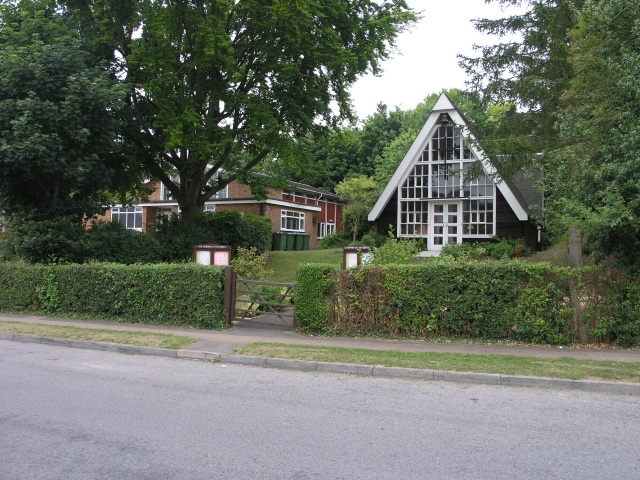
- St Stephen-on-the-Downs church, Rosebery Avenue

- Location within Surrey
- OS grid reference: TQ234561
- District: Epsom and Ewell
- Shire county: Surrey
- Region: South East
- Country: England
- Sovereign state: United Kingdom
- Post town: Epsom
- Postcode district: KT
- Dialling code: 01372
- Police: Surrey
- Fire: Surrey
- Ambulance: South East Coast
- UK Parliament: Epsom and Ewell

Langley Vale is a village in the Borough of Epsom and Ewell, in Surrey, England, approximately 15 miles (24 km) south of central London. As its name suggests, the village is in a dry valley between Epsom Downs and Walton Downs. Historically part of the Ashtead Park estate, Langley Vale was the location of a farm in medieval times. The modern village began to develop in the late 19th and early 20th centuries.

The nearest settlements are Burgh Heath to the east, Tadworth to the south-east, Headley to the south, Ashtead to the west and the Woodcote part of Epsom to the north.

Epsom Downs Racecourse is 1 mile to the northeast and Woodcote Park, a stately home owned by the Royal Automobile Club, is 1 mile to the west.

== History ==
Patent Rolls and similar reveal the Vale was originally a farm with several tenants and later it became in effect a single farm (Langley Bottom Farm) and that after the Black Death or at least after the 14th century it started to disappear from the map. In a document dated 1255/1268 the land appears to be held by a William de Langley. John at Ley from Headley takes it on in 1331/2 and again in 1333/4, succeeding John de Langley. In 1347/8 the tenant is a John at Ley then the records give out. In 1435/6 another John Langley is tenant as subtenant of a William de Langhead of Epsom. The manorial survey of 1496 suggests it was being farmed as a single holding.

Historically, the land which comprised the village of Langley Bottom was, until 1877, part of the Ashtead Park Estate, although it was in the parish of Epsom.

It was subsequently sold as building land. OS maps show gradual development - in 1895, the road layout is shown but no development. By 1913 roads and some houses are named. By 1932 there are more houses but still some undeveloped areas. A great deal of development took place after World War II and in the 1970s infill houses were built on some of the large gardens.

The names Langley Bottom and Langley Vale both predate 1911 when they were both used in the 1911 Census returns. The names could well define two separate areas of the village I.e. the bottom of the road being separate from the upper part. The farm was called Langley Bottom Farm in 1911.

The village has a long association with the racing industry and Epsom Racecourse. Many trainers set up training stables within the village and by the 1950s as there was as many as 15 training stables in Langley Vale. Many villagers worked in the racing industry, too.

== Economy and amenities ==
Epsom and Ewell Borough Council has permitted minor back-plot development which has permitted higher density development, and some subdivision of plots while still keeping to neat road grid (nucleated village layout) with designated but sufficient parking to every house, overall, except for The Derby, which takes place on a start-of-summer weekend.

The village has no pub (The Rubbing House across the racecourse being nearest) and very little in the way of shops, a small community centre and church. There is a single petrol station on the main road, and one school.

== Transport ==
=== Road ===
The village can be accessed via two roads.

The village has only two bus services; route E5 to Watersedge via Epsom and the 676 school bus to Rosebery School (Epsom), St Andrew's School (Ashtead) and Therfield School (Leatherhead).

=== Rail ===
The nearest stations are Tattenham Corner (2 miles by road or 1 mile on foot across the fields) and Epsom Downs (about 2.5 miles).

== Emergency services ==
- Surrey Police
- South East Coast Ambulance Service, formed, as of 1 July 2006 by the merger of the Surrey Ambulance Service, Sussex, and Kent ambulance services
- Surrey Fire and Rescue Service

== See also ==
- List of places of worship in Epsom and Ewell
