= Providence Chapel, Charlwood =

Providence Chapel
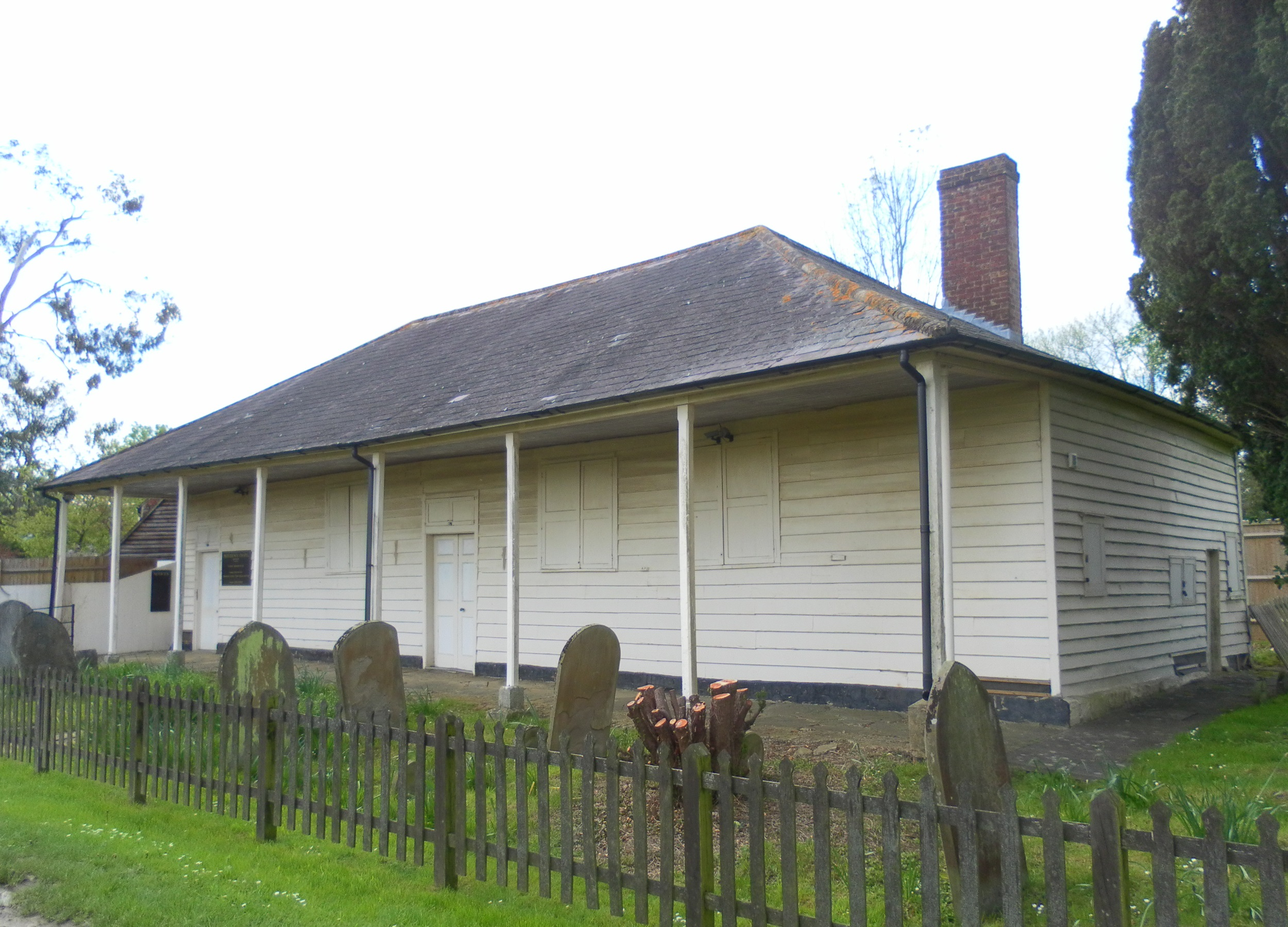
- The chapel from the east

- The chapel shown within Surrey
- 51.1567°N 0.2188°W
- OS grid reference: TQ 24662 41225
- Location: Chapel Road, Charlwood, Surrey RH6 0DA
- Country: England
- Denomination: Strict Baptist
- Previous denomination: Independent Calvinistic

History
- Former name: Charlwood Union Chapel
- Status: Chapel
- Founded: c. 1814
- Founder: Joseph Flint
- Events: c. 1800: built in Horsham as a barracks 1815 or 1816: moved to Charlwood

Architecture
- Functional status: Closed
- Heritage designation: Grade II*
- Designated: 7 April 1983
- Architectural type: Timber-framed
- Style: New England Vernacular
- Completed: 15 November 1816
- Closed: c. 2010

Specifications
- Materials: Weatherboarding and timber framing on brick base; slate roof

Providence Chapel (founded as Charlwood Union Chapel) is a former Nonconformist place of worship in the village of Charlwood in Surrey, England. Founded in 1816 on the outskirts of the ancient village, it was associated with Independent Calvinists and Strict Baptists throughout nearly two centuries of religious use. The "startling" wooden building with a simple veranda-fronted style had seen several years of service as an officers' mess at a nearby barracks. The chapel was put up for sale in 2012. English Heritage has listed it at Grade II* for its architectural and historical importance. It was also on that body's Heritage at Risk Register because of its poor structural condition, but repairs were carried out and in 2019 it was deemed no longer at risk.

== History ==
Joseph Flint was an early 19th-century shopkeeper in the village of Charlwood on the Surrey/Sussex border. Unlike most residents at the time, he was a Protestant Nonconformist and from around 1814 worshipped in a cottage with a small group of like-minded people rather than at St Nicholas' Church, the Anglican parish church. Meanwhile, during the Napoleonic Wars, a barracks existed in the Sussex market town of Horsham. A wooden guardroom or officers' mess was erected there in about 1800. (Note: Chambers (1952) records that one source describes the building as a stable.) After the war the barracks was decommissioned, and the timber mess building was dismantled and transported on wagons to Charlwood. There the "strange [and] quaint" structure was re-erected in a field on a dirt track north of the village, and on 15 November 1816 it opened as an Independent Calvinistic chapel for Flint and his fellow worshippers. The opening sermons at Charlwood Union Chapel, as it was originally called, were preached by ministers from chapels at Epsom and Dorking. Epsom had an Independent Calvinistic chapel of its own—the denomination was "closely associated with Surrey" in the 18th and 19th centuries, and Bugby Chapel was opened there in 1779.

The chapel only had one permanent pastor: C.T. Smith, who served from 1816 until 1834. Since then, it was served mostly by Strict Baptist ministers, and although it was nominally an Independent Calvinistic place of worship it adopted the character of a Strict Baptist chapel. Smith regularly preached in the village of Horley, 2 miles (3.2 km) away, and in 1846 a Strict Baptist chapel was built there with assistance from the Charlwood cause. The congregation moved from the wooden chapel at Lee Street to a new larger building near Horley railway station in 1881. (Both of these chapels have been demolished, but the burial ground at Lee Street survives.)

Charlwood Union Chapel was renamed Providence Chapel, and services were latterly held on Sunday afternoons and Wednesday evenings. The building was advertised for sale by a local estate agent in 2012. It was offered on a freehold basis at a guide price of £49,500, and was advertised as "in need of repair and improvement" and as being on the national Heritage at Risk Register. For planning purposes, places of worship are covered by Use Class D1; any new owner would be allowed to use the building for D1-class activities (Note: As defined by the Town and Country Planning (Use Classes) Order 1987, Use Class D1 covers "non-residential institutions" of the following types: places of worship, church halls, health centres and clinics, non-residential nurseries and crèches, schools, other educational and training centres, libraries, museums, public halls, art galleries and law courts.) without seeking planning permission, but any change of use would require approval from Mole Valley District Council. The purchaser would also have to keep the graveyard around the chapel in its existing condition and allow burials on request. In spring 2013, the Charlwood Society—a local history and preservation group—became the new trustees of the chapel.

Under the name Charlwood Union Chapel, the chapel was registered for marriages on 7 December 1844. It was also registered with this name as a place of worship under the Places of Worship Registration Act 1855; as it predates the passing of the Act, its identity number on the Worship Register is 1.

== Architecture ==
Providence Chapel's architecture is considered unusual, especially in the context of the Surrey countryside. Ian Nairn and Nikolaus Pevsner called it "a startling building to find in Surrey, or even in England", and claimed that "it would not be out of place in the remotest part of East Kentucky". Strict Baptist historian Ralph Chambers likened it to "a pioneer's shack from some faraway backwood of Canada", while English Heritage state that it appears "more typical of New England than Surrey". Its importance is enhanced by its status as a "rare survival" from Napoleonic-era England, and it is considered the most unusual of the many 19th-century Nonconformist chapels across Surrey.

The single-storey building is timber-framed with a weatherboarded exterior resting on a brick plinth. The hipped roof has a brick chimney-stack, is tiled with slate and extends over the front of the building as a seven-bay veranda with wooden pillars. The main entrance door is centrally placed and has six panels; there is a four-panelled subsidiary door on the southwest side, and casement windows with original external shutters flank both doors. There are also two blocked windows on the east side. A path of Charlwood stone leads to the entrance.

Inside, two vestries occupy the northeast side of the building, one of which retains an original fireplace. Other early-19th-century fittings include the octagonal pulpit, box pews and a table. The internal floor area is 1,354 square feet (125.8 m^{2}), and the chapel occupies a 0.17-acre (0.069 ha) plot of land which includes a graveyard.

== Heritage status ==
The chapel was listed at Grade II* by English Heritage on 7 April 1983. Such buildings are defined as "particularly important [and] of more than special interest". As of February 2001, it was one of 44 Grade II* listed buildings and 968 listed buildings of all grades in the district of Mole Valley, the local government district in which Charlwood is situated. Only 5.5 per cent of England's 375,000 listed buildings have Grade II* status, the second highest on the three-grade scale.

English Heritage added the building to its Heritage at Risk Register in 2012 as a Priority A project. It described the chapel's condition as "poor" and "in need of repair", and noted that its long-term future was uncertain. In 2019 the National Lottery Heritage Fund provided a grant of £260,000 for the restoration of the chapel; work included structural repairs to the roof, weatherboarded walls and timber framing. The former chapel was removed from the Register in October of that year, and it is now used by the local community in Charlwood.

== Bibliography ==
- Chambers, Ralph (1952). The Strict Baptist Chapels of England: Surrey and Hampshire. Vol. 1. Thornton Heath: Ralph Chambers.
- Nairn, Ian; Pevsner, Nikolaus (1971) [1962]. The Buildings of England: Surrey (2nd ed.). Harmondsworth: Penguin Books. ISBN 0-300-09675-5.
- Stell, Christopher (2002). Nonconformist Chapels and Meeting-houses in Eastern England. Swindon: English Heritage. ISBN 1-873592-50-7.
