= St Mary's Church, Ewell =

Church in Surrey, England

Coordinates: 51°21′14″N 0°14′50.5″W

- The Church of Saint Mary the Virgin, Ewell, seen from the West.
- St Mary's Church, Ewell
- Denomination: Church of England
- Churchmanship: Liberal Catholic
- Website: www.stmarysewell.com

History
- Dedication: Saint Mary the Virgin

Administration
- Province: Canterbury
- Diocese: Guildford
- Archdeaconry: Dorking
- Deanery: Epsom
- Parish: Ewell, St Mary

Clergy
- Vicar: Fr Mark Stafford SCP

The Anglican Church of St Mary the Virgin, Ewell is the civic church of the borough of Epsom and Ewell in the county of Surrey in South East England.

== History ==
=== Early history ===
There has been a church dedicated to Saint Mary the Virgin in Ewell since the 13th century, a board above the south door in the current building recording incumbents from 1239 to the present day. There were two reasons for the demolition of the old church (except for the 15th-century belltower, which still stands in the churchyard today): one was that the building was in such a parlous state of structural repair that it would come down whether demolished under control or allowed to collapse; another was that the incumbent at the time, Sir George Lewen Glyn (known to have been both Rector and Lord of the manor simultaneously), resented his parishioners' carts all passing his rectory/manor house on their way to Sunday services, so had a new church built at the junction (one of two) of Church Road and London Road (both of which are arc-shaped) further away from the rectory.

Dedicated in 1848, the current building stands in a prominent position near the centre of the village of Ewell, on the old London Road. Designed by local architect Henry Clutton, it was built in a simple, modest form of the Decorated Gothic style (apart from an ostentatious vaulted west porch, erected c. 1905) and faced with Swanage stone (not to be confused with Purbeck Marble) with Bath stone mullions and tracery. The North Aisle was enlarged in the late 19th century. The real glories, however, are inside. There is a fine marble pulpit, as well as the medieval font and chancel screen (which was extended somewhat to fit the larger chancel arch of the new church) from the old building.

=== Modern history ===
A fire in 1973, started by the explosion of the church's central heating boiler, destroyed the North Aisle and everything in it, including an organ built in 1865 by "Father" Henry Willis, except a print of The Light of the World by the painter and local resident William Holman Hunt, who painted the original by the disused gunpowder mills in Kingston Road. The church was fortunately able to buy a similar organ (closely similar to the famous instrument in Truro Cathedral) from the church of St Augustine, Highbury, London, which was under threat of closure (see below).

Recently, a set of Stations of the Cross and Resurrection by the artist and parishioner Iain McKillop were dedicated for use at St Mary's, having been displayed at Lichfield Cathedral.

== The "Father Willis" organ ==
The organ was originally built in 1889 by the organ builder Henry Willis for the Anglican parish church of St Augustine, Highbury. In 1975 there was a risk that the latter church would be closed—so, to protect the organ's future, they sold it to Saint Mary's, which had lost a similar instrument in a fire two years previously. However, in an ironic twist of fate, the church in Highbury was reprieved just days after the organ was removed and another nearby church, dedicated to St John, closed instead (whose rather smaller organ was installed at St Augustine's).

The Ewell organ was installed in its new home by the Liverpool-based firm of Rushworth and Dreaper, but was left much as it had originally been built. Some of the organ's finely stencilled front-pipes (those that formed the front at Ewell) were painted gold, in accordance with the fashions of the time. However, a few stencilled pipes can be seen from a few angles behind these (see image 6). This instrument is, despite its prestigious origins (it was often regarded as the best of several similar instruments built in the Highbury area), comparatively little-known. The Vicar of Ewell, the Parochial Church Council and the Director of Music have decided that efforts should be made to redress this situation and, to that end, are to promote the instrument through a number of recitals and concerts.

=== Stop list ===
Great Organ
Double Open Diapason	16′
Open Diapason 1	8′
Open Diapason 2	8′
Claribel Flute	8′
Principal	4′
Flute harmonique	4′
Twelfth	2^{2}/_{3}′
Fifteenth	2′
Mixture III	(1^{3}/_{5}′)
Double Trumpet	16′
Posaune	8′
Clarion	4′

Choir Organ
Dulciana	8′
Lieblich Gedact	8′
Claribel Flute	8′
Gamba	8′
Concert Flute	4′
Piccolo	2′
Corno di Bassetto	8′
Orchestral Oboe	8′

Swell Organ
Lieblich Bourdon	16′
Open Diapason	8′
Lieblich Gedact	8′
Salcional	8′
Vox Angelica	8′
Gemshorn	4′
Flageolet	2′
Mixture III	(1^{3}/_{5}′)
Contra Hautboy	16′
Cornopean	8′
Hautboy	8′
Vox Humana	8′
Clarion	4′
Tremulant

Pedal Organ
Open Diapason	16′
Violone	16′
Bourdon	16′
Octave	8′
Bass Flute	8′
Ophicleide	16′

== See also ==
- List of places of worship in Epsom and Ewell

== Gallery ==
The west front

The west wall, showing the balcony and the Stations of the Cross and Resurrection by parishioner Iain McKillop

The church from the South-East

The church from the South

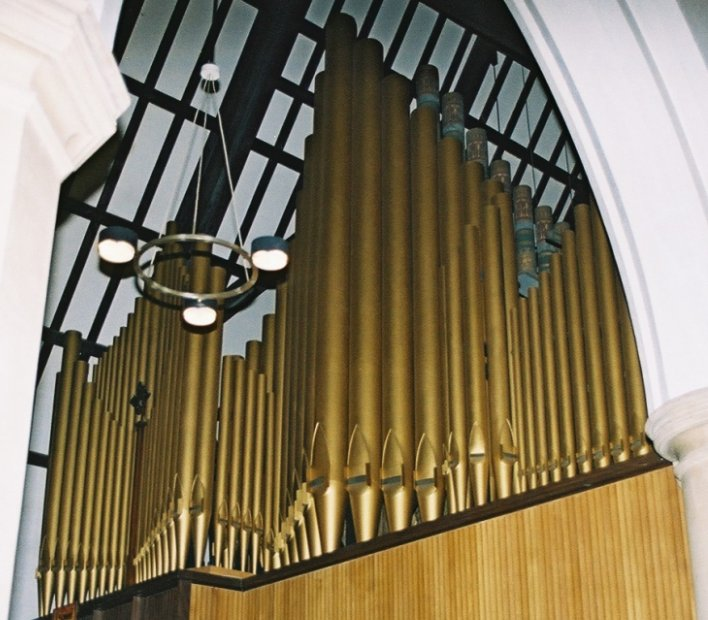
The West-facing pipe-front of the current organ, showing the stencilled pipes behind the front

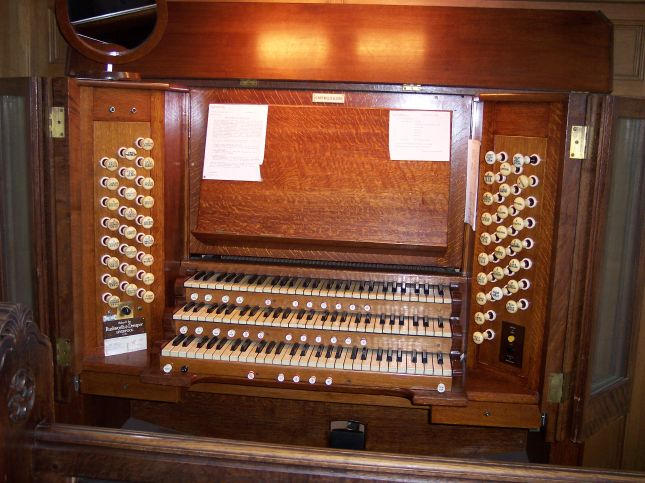
The console of the current organ

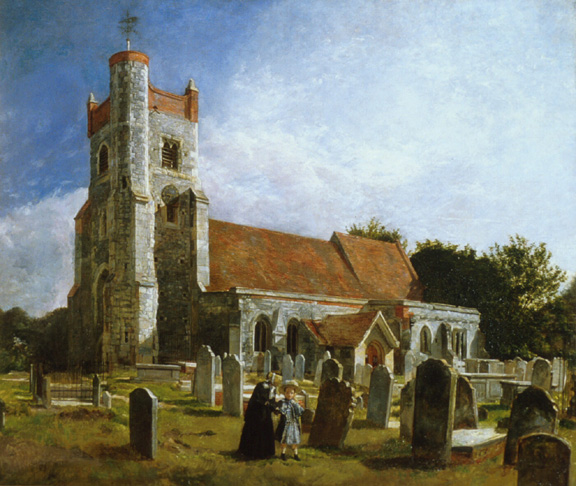
A painting of the old church by William Holman Hunt, 1847

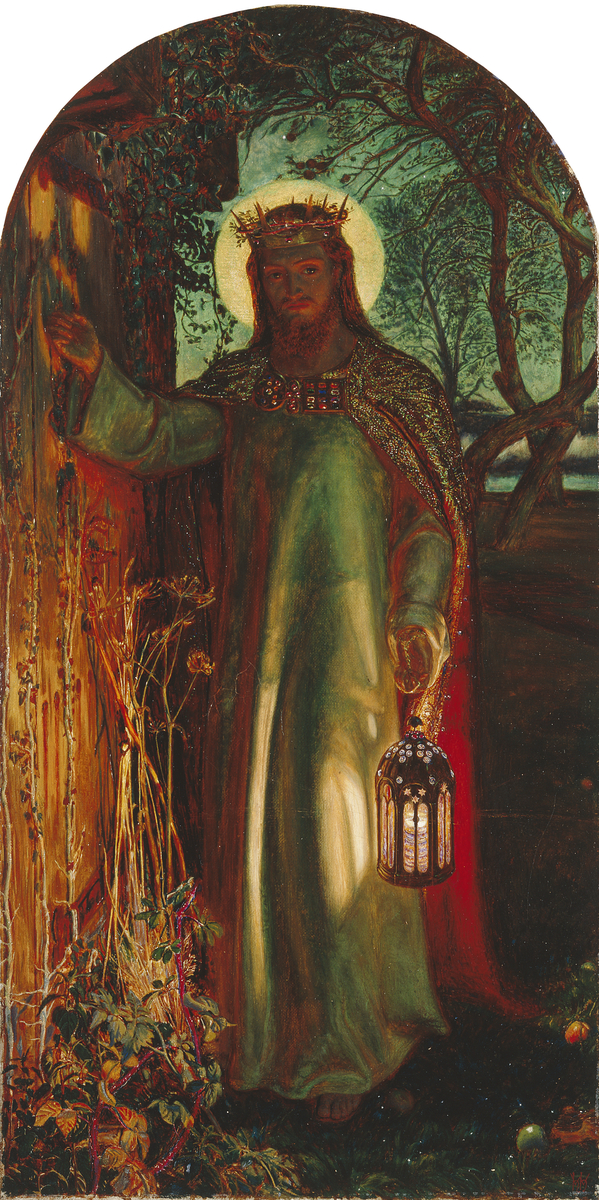
Hunt's The Light of the World. The original was painted in Ewell and a copy now hangs in the church.
