= St Martin of Tours church, Epsom =

Church in Epsom, Surrey, England

Coordinates: 51°19′51″N 0°15′32″W

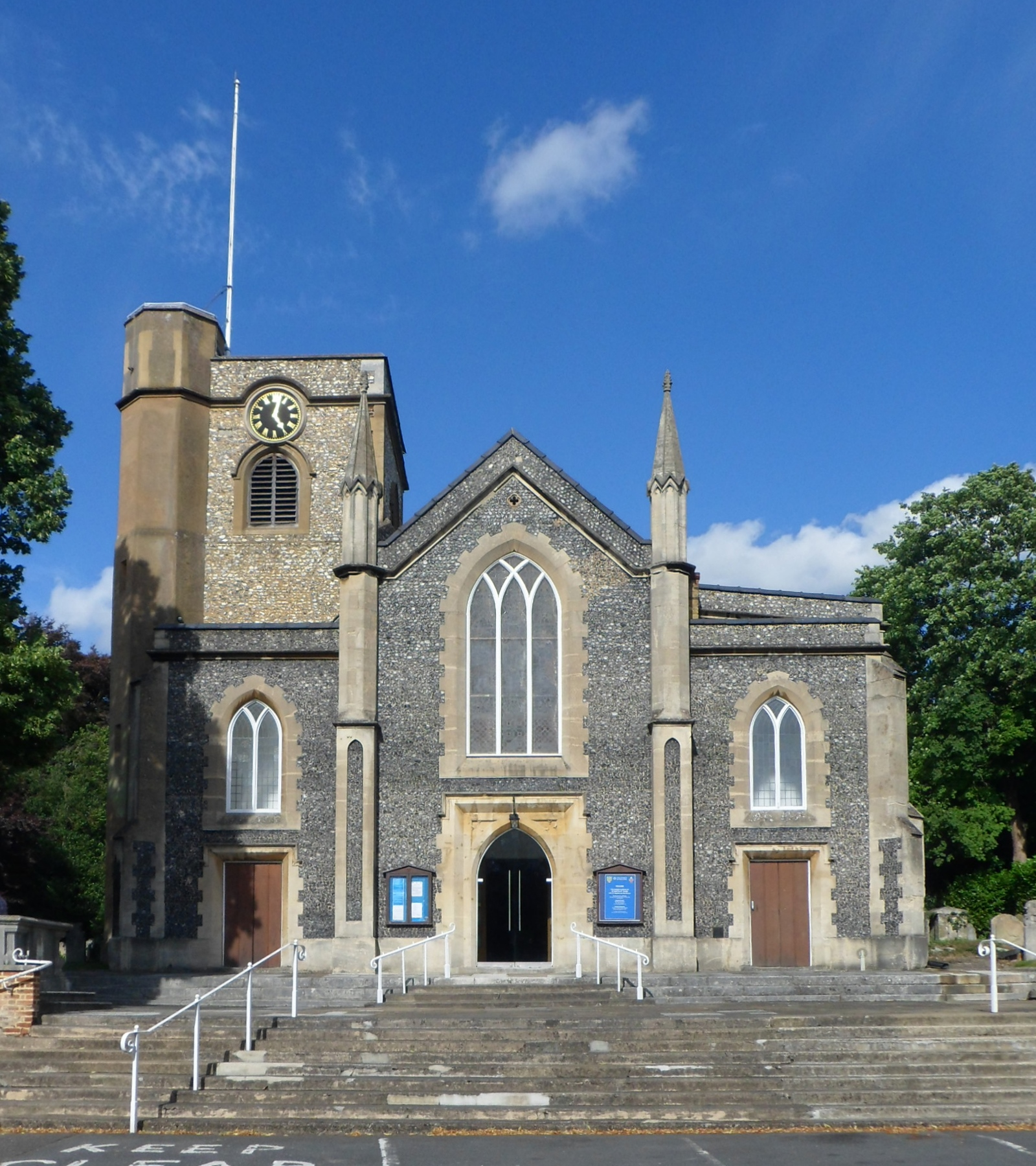
Front portal

St Martin of Tours church, Epsom is a Grade II* listed building, number 1028592, in Church Street, Epsom, Surrey, KT17 4PX.

The flint tower dates from about 1450. The rest of the church was rebuilt in 1824 to designs by Mr Hatchard of Pimlico. In 1908 the choir and transepts were added by Sir Charles Nicholson.

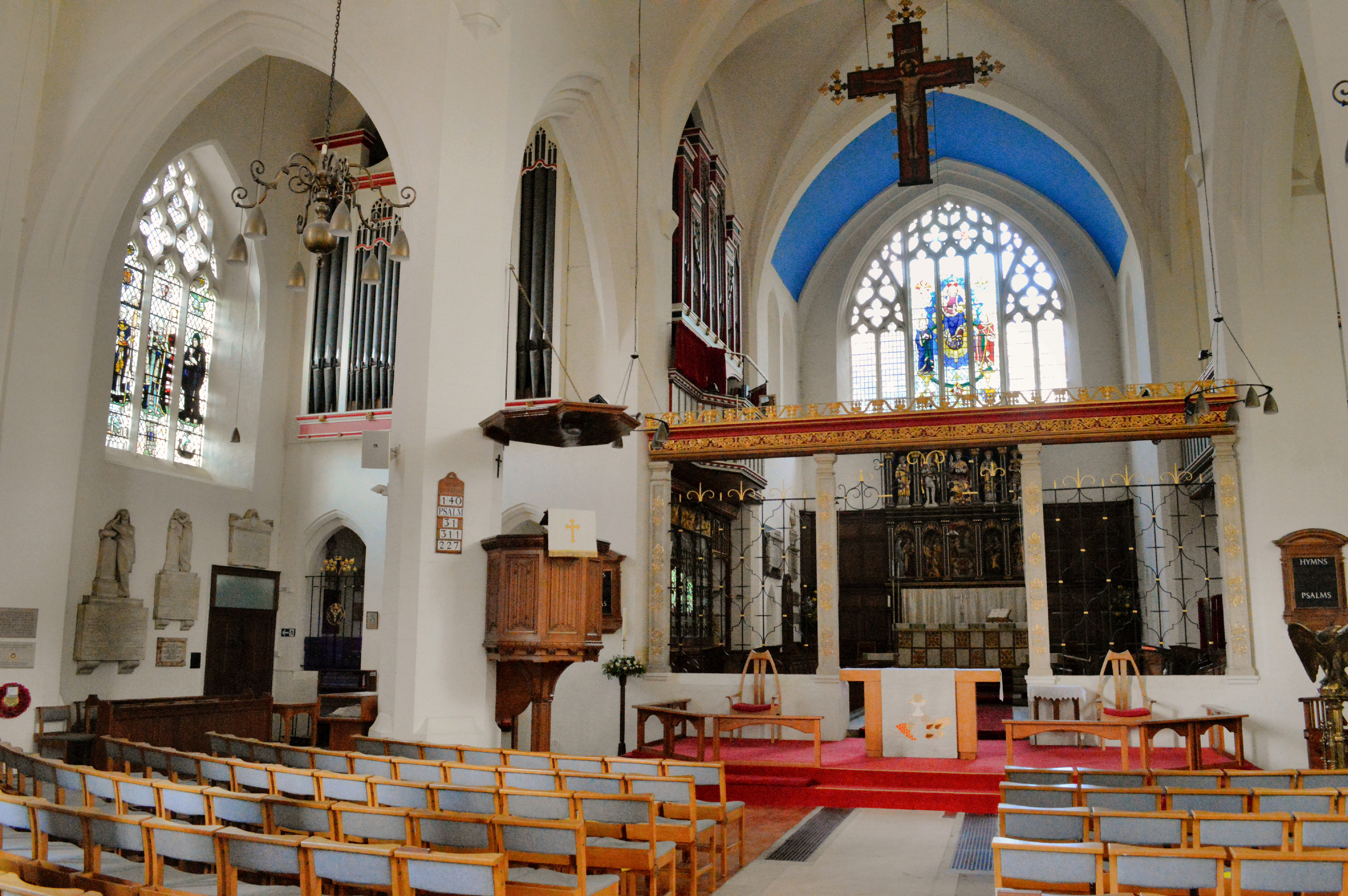
Interior

The organ is a fine three-manual Norman and Beard organ. There is a two-level reredos above the altar with small statues of saints.

There are war memorials for the men of St Martin's Epsom who died in the Great War and to those who died in the Burma Campaign, 1942–45. The graveyard contains some fine monuments.

== Monuments ==
Several monuments from the old church survived and are now in the nave of the new church. They represent the following individuals:

Name	Sculptor
Robert Coke (1643) and wife (1653)	
Richard Evelyn (1660), son of Richard Evelyn of Wootton.	
Robert Coke of Nonesuch (1681)	
Elizabeth Evelyn (1691) wife of Richard Evelyn of Woodcott	
John Lloyd (1718/19) of the Middle Temple, London	
Sarah Cuthbert (1777), wife of Arthur Cuthbert of Woodcott (1788)	Vidler
Charles Cuthbert (1777)	Vidler
Richard Brand Cuthbert (1806)	Vidler
John Brathwaite (1800)	John Flaxman
John Henry Warre (1801) and his wife Mrs Braithwaite Warre (1824)	John Flaxman
Eleanor Belfield (1802)	
Jane Rowe (1810)	John Bacon Junior
Susan Warre (1820) and son John Braithwaite (1821), an infant	Francis Chantrey
Edward Knipe (1825) and his wife Caroline (Western) Knipe	Humphrey Hopper

== See also ==
- List of places of worship in Epsom and Ewell
