= Bugby Chapel =

Eighteenth-century former chapel in the centre of Epsom, Surrey, England

- East Street Chapel; Salem Unitarian Chapel; Salem Baptist Chapel; Epsom and District Synagogue
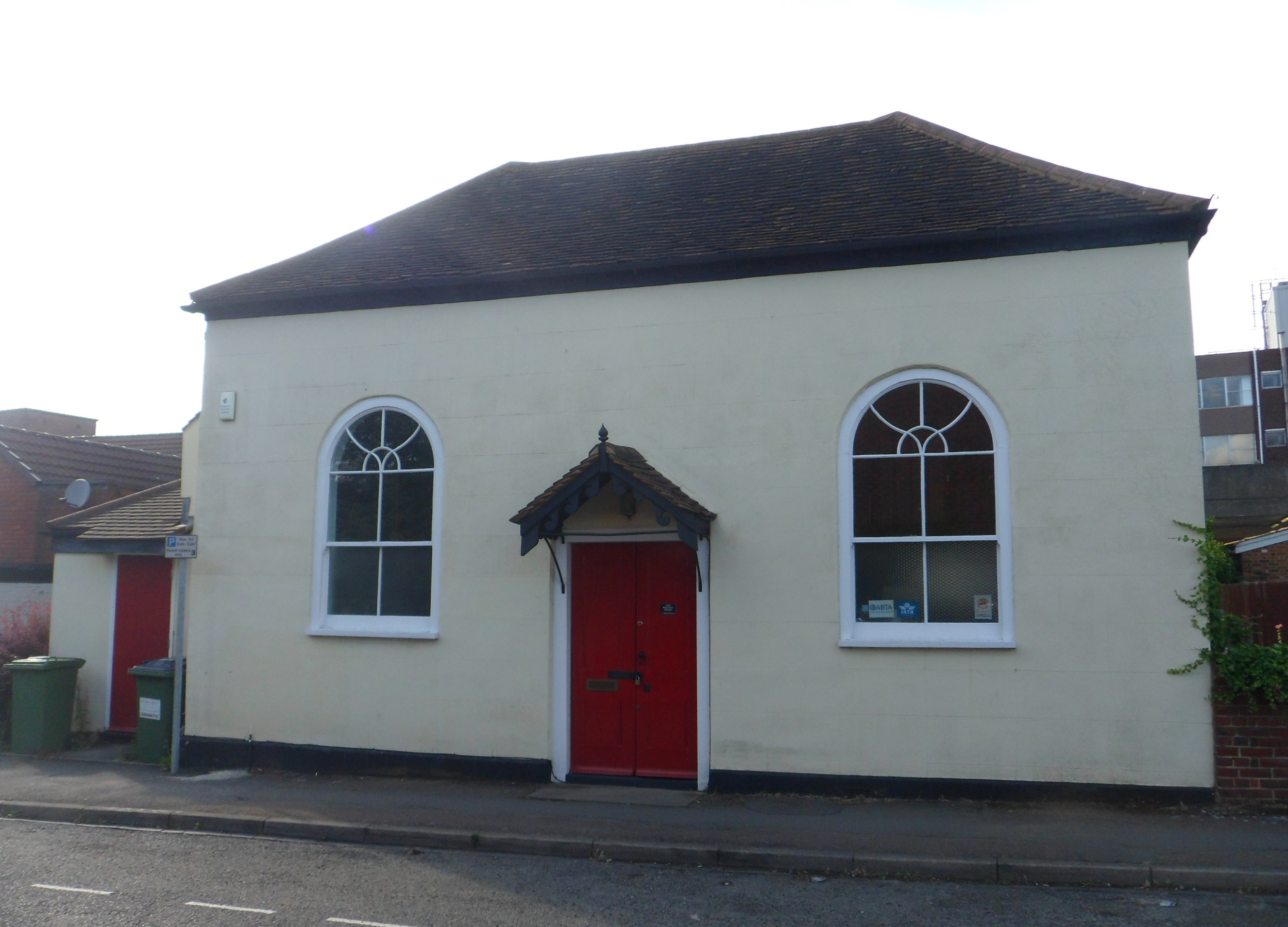
- The former chapel from the southeast

Location map and quick summary
Location within Surrey
51°20′07″N 0°15′41″W
OS grid reference	TQ 21209 61011
Location	31 Prospect Place, off East Street, Epsom, Surrey KT17 1WW
Country	England
Denomination	Jewish
Previous denomination	Calvinistic Independent; Unitarian; Strict Baptist
History
Former name(s)	East Street Chapel; Little Chapel; Old Huntingtonian Chapel; Salem Unitarian Chapel; Salem Baptist Chapel
Status	Chapel
Founded	1779
Founder	William Bugby
Consecrated	October 1954 (as synagogue)
Events	1779: built as Calvinistic chapel 1889: transferred to Strict Baptists; 1954: bought by Jewish community 1994: closed and sold
Architecture
Functional status	Closed
Heritage designation	Grade II
Designated	20 May 1975
Style	Classical
Groundbreaking	1779
Closed	1994 (as synagogue)
Specifications
Length	25 1/4 feet (7.7 m)
Width	31 1/4 feet (9.5 m)
Materials	Brick, stucco walls; tiled roof

Bugby Chapel is an 18th-century former chapel in the centre of Epsom, a suburban town in Surrey, England. Known by this name (or Bugby's Chapel) in reference to its Calvinistic founder William Bugby, it was also known as East Street Chapel and later, as it passed into the ownership of different religious groups, as Salem Unitarian Chapel, Salem Baptist Chapel and the Epsom and District Synagogue. More than 200 years of religious use ended when it was converted into an office. The chapel is a Grade II Listed building.

== History ==
Epsom became a fashionable town in the 18th century, popular with businesspeople and wealthy merchants from London who wanted to live in a country town within easy reach of the city. Protestant Nonconformism emerged in the town soon after the Act of Uniformity 1662, when covert Presbyterian meetings took place; a chapel was built in 1724, and hundreds of worshippers attended. It was an era in which congregations frequently split and new churches were formed in accordance with the views of their ministers, and such a secession occurred in the 1770s when William Bugby, a preacher with strong Calvinistic views, came to Epsom. He was influenced by the well-known ultra-Calvinist William Huntington, who moved to Ewell in 1775 after experiencing a religious conversion and held meetings there. Bugby took out certificates for the registration of religious meeting houses in Epsom in 1777 and 1778.

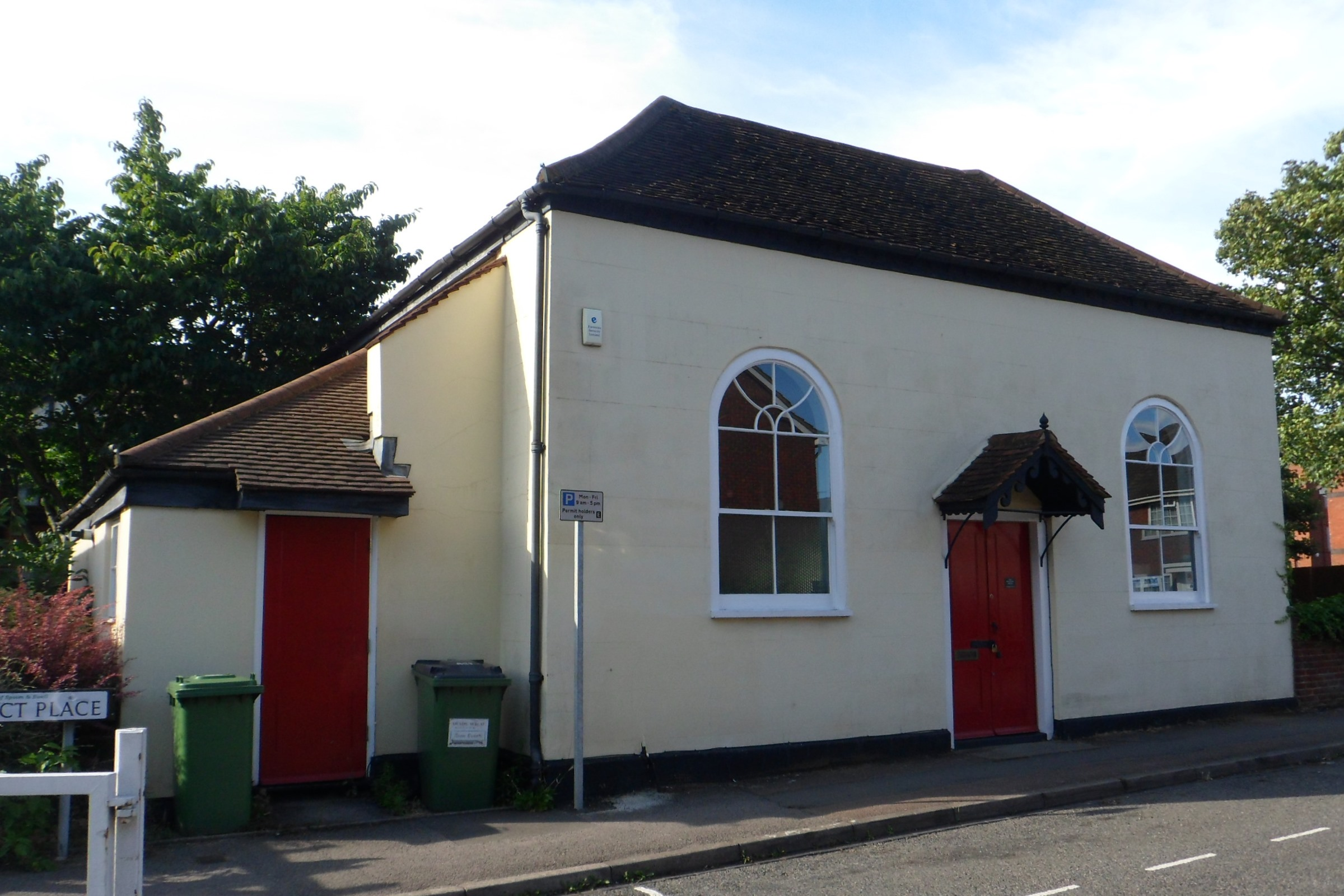
The chapel was erected in 1779.

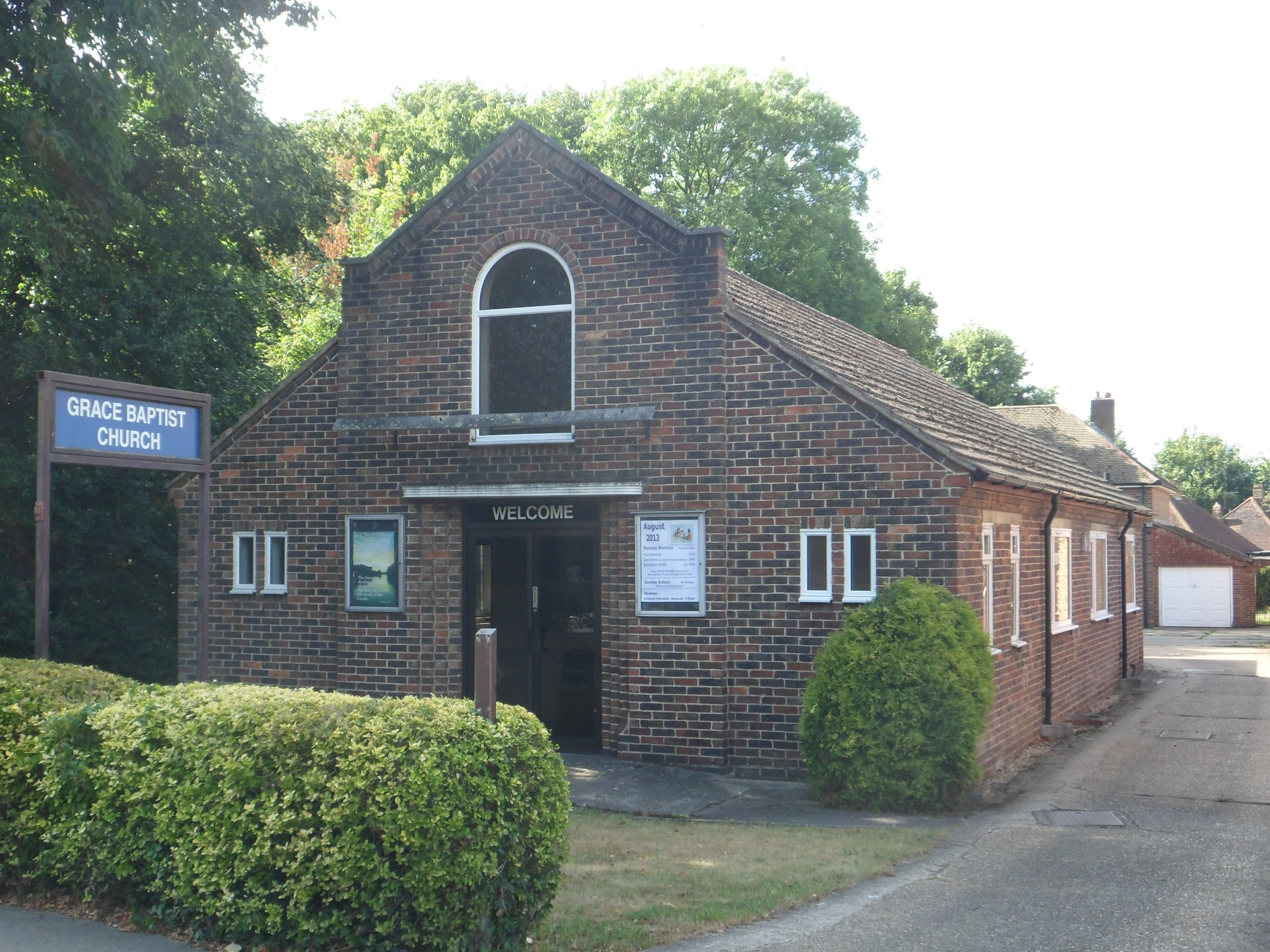
Strict Baptists used Bugby Chapel until 1951, when this brick-built church was built elsewhere in the town.

In 1779, Bugby bought a plot of land "on a narrow lane behind the [then] main London Road" and erected a chapel. A house, later called Rose Cottage, was attached to this, and there was a burial ground to the northeast. William Huntington's name was recorded in the registers there in that year as one of the ministers who had conducted baptisms. Bugby was then invited to preach in Brockham, near Dorking, in 1780; his meetings were successful, and a chapel was built in 1783. Like the chapel in Epsom, its character was Independent Calvinistic. (Such worship was "closely associated with Surrey" in the 18th and 19th centuries; other chapels established for preachers with these views include Providence Chapel at Charlwood, founded in 1816). From 1783 until his death in 1792, (Note: English Heritage incorrectly gives his date of death as 1772.) Bugby ministered at both the Epsom and the Brockham chapel. He also registered other places of worship in Surrey villages such as Effingham, Leigh and Betchworth. The nature of worship at the chapel in its early years was not well understood: the Anglican vicar of Epsom stated in 1788 that "a few years ago a gardener ... collected money enough to build a small [meeting] house, where he now has a small and uncertain congregation of Methodists ... they are chiefly people of the lowest class". Also at this time, the name of the chapel was not fixed: Bugby Chapel or Bugby's Chapel were used, but East Street Chapel, Little Chapel and the Old Huntingtonian Chapel were also recorded.

Calvinistic meetings continued at Bugby Chapel until 1825 or 1837, the date at which its baptismal and marriage registers were lodged at Somerset House in London. Events later in the 19th century are not clearly documented, although in the Government's religious census of 1851 it was recorded as a meeting place for Calvinistic Protestants. Attendance was said to be 30 to 40 people, and the Handbook of Epsom published in 1860 mentioned that "Joseph Irons [a preacher from a chapel at Camberwell] used occasionally to preach there". In 1889, the chapel took on a new guise as a Strict Baptist chapel when new trustees were appointed. The name Salem Chapel was adopted. The 1894 Ordnance Survey map identified it as Salem Unitarian Chapel, but it was reconstituted as Strict Baptist in 1896. A new trustees' document was produced on 17 August 1899, and thereafter the chapel was identified as Baptist on maps. Permanent pastors served between 1923 and 1932 and from 1944 onwards. A new chapel was built on the Dorking Road for the congregation in 1951; the "very nicely designed and fitted place of worship" opened on 30 June 1951, and Bugby Chapel was vacated.

After a short period of disuse, the chapel came back into religious use in 1954 when it was converted into the Epsom and District Synagogue. Hans Leo Lehmann (1907–1992), a German-born chemist, moved to Epsom in 1940 and started small-scale meetings for Jewish worship in his house in Woodcote Road in May 1941. Services were later held at a building in Church Street, the Lecture Hall of Epsom Congregational Church and the Foresters' Hall, but in 1954 Lehmann acquired the freehold of the former Bugby Chapel. It was reconsecrated as a synagogue in October 1954 by Dr M. Lew, and local Jews invested their own time and money in converting the building into a synagogue. It was registered for worship in accordance with the Places of Worship Registration Act 1855 and was given the Worship Register Number 64502. Membership of the synagogue reached 28 in 1960, but Epsom's Jewish community was always small and the congregation was already in decline when Lehmann—always the "leading member" and chief organiser of the synagogue—died in 1992. By 1993 there were only 13 members, and the congregation decided to join the synagogue in nearby Sutton. In 1994, the building was converted into an office with the name The Meeting House.

The chapel was designated a Grade II Listed building on 20 May 1975. The adjoining Rose Cottage was no longer associated with the chapel after 1843, when it became a private house, and it was demolished in 1978.

== Architecture ==
Bugby Chapel is a simple single-storey building in the Classical style. The walls are of brick with a later covering of stucco. Above the brick cornice the roof is hipped on each of the four sides, creating a hidden central "valley", and is laid with tiles. The façade faces south and is of three symmetrical bays with centrally placed panelled double doors below a gabled hood mould. This has a tiled roof of its own and is flanked by bargeboards. The left and right bays have tall round-arched windows with original metal bars. There are similar windows in the north wall, and the east wall has two blank windows. No original features survive inside. The interior dimensions are 25 1/4 by 31 1/4 feet (7.7 m × 9.5 m).

== Burial ground ==
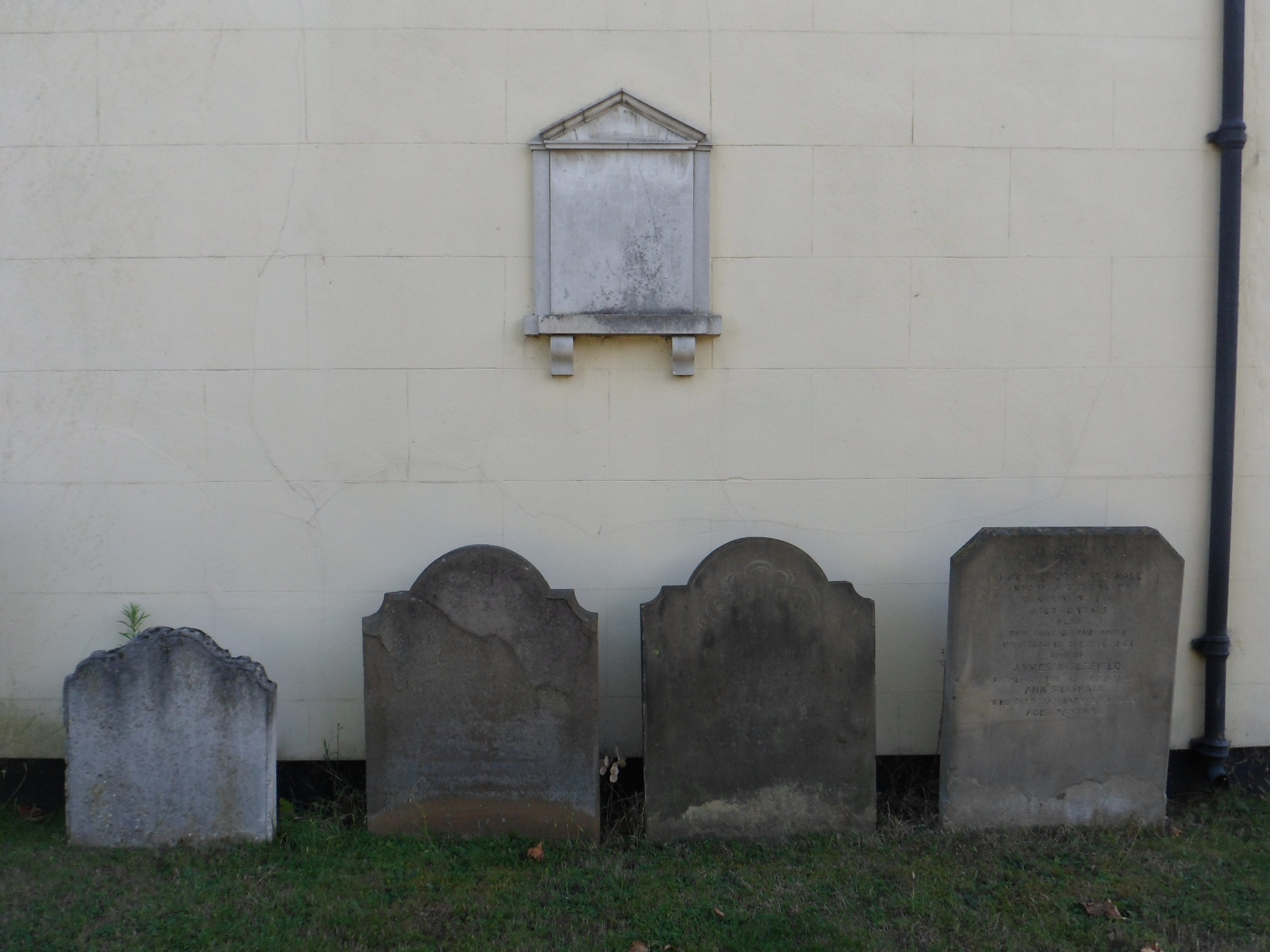
There are several gravestones and a marble memorial in the burial ground next to the chapel.

There are ten gravestones and monuments in the small burial ground to the east of the chapel. The first is a 40 by 29 inches (102 cm × 74 cm) headstone and accompanying footstone, neither with any inscription. Next is a 38 by 28 inches (97 cm × 71 cm) headstone commemorating Mary Gillam (d. 1867) and her husband James (d. 1870). The Swann family—George (d. 1849), Charlotte (d. 1874) and Charlotte junior (d. 1884)—are listed on the next headstone, which measures 44 by 24 inches (112 cm × 61 cm) and which has a footstone bearing their initials. The next measures 44 by 30 1/2 inches (112 cm × 77 cm) and names Ann Snashall (née Inglefield; d. 1858), two infant children and her father James Inglefield (d. 1864). Smaller and partly illegible, the next gravestone (23 1/2 by 19 inches (60 cm × 48 cm)) commemorates Elizabeth Sloper (d. 1846?). Thomas Ellis (d. 1798) is named on a 45 by 30 inches (114 cm × 76 cm) headstone, next to which is another measuring 54 by 30 inches (137 cm × 76 cm) headstone which commemorates members of the Humphrey family: Mary (d. 1852) and John (d. 1866), five children who died between 1820 and 1854, and a grandchild (d. 1872). On the next headstone, William Bugby himself (d. 1792?) is commemorated alongside his wife Mary (d. 1787). The same Thomas Ellis (d. 1798) appears again on a pedimented monument of white marble which was taken from the chapel and placed against the east wall; it measures 38 by 26 1/4 inches (97 cm × 67 cm). Next to this stands a 53 by 30 inches (135 cm × 76 cm) headstone which names Joseph Weller (d. 1864), his wife Maria (d. 1859) and their son Joseph junior (d. 1851); this also has a footstone with their initials.

== See also ==
- List of places of worship in Epsom and Ewell

== Bibliography ==
- Chambers, Ralph (1952). The Strict Baptist Chapels of England: Surrey and Hampshire. Vol. 1. Thornton Heath: Ralph Chambers.
- Stell, Christopher (2002). Nonconformist Chapels and Meeting-houses in Eastern England. Swindon: English Heritage. ISBN 1-873592-50-7.
