= William Huntington (preacher) =

English Calvinist preacher

William Huntington S.S.
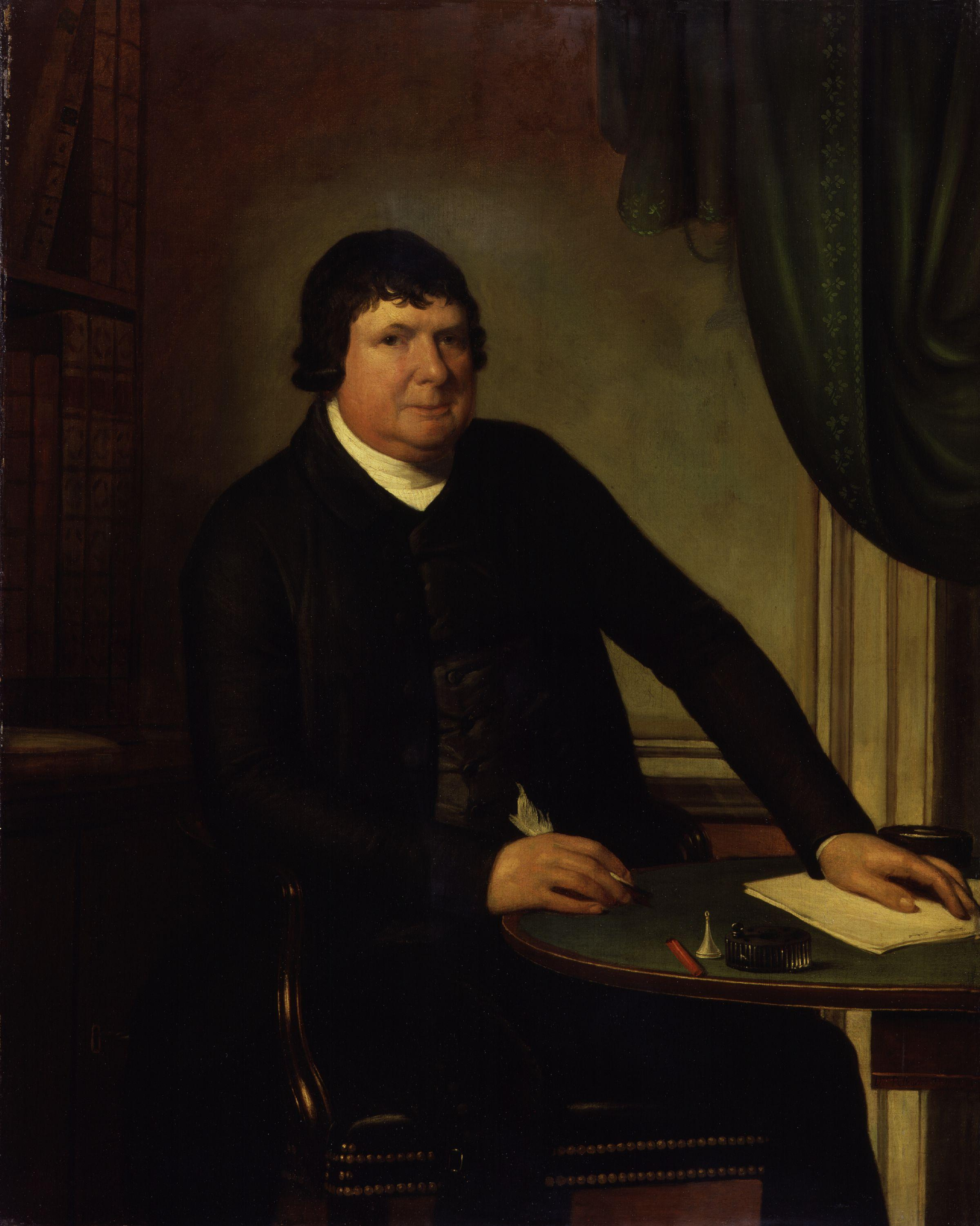
- William Huntington by Domenico Pellegrini
- Born: 2 February 1745; Four Wents, Cranbrook, Kent
- Died: 1 July 1813 (aged 68); Tunbridge Wells, Kent
- Education: Dencen Free Grammar School
- Occupations: Preacher and coalheaver
- Spouse(s): Mary Short (1769–1806); Lady Elizabeth Sanderson (1808–1813)
- Children: John Fever
- Parent(s): Elizabeth Hunt and Barnabus Russel

William Huntington S.S. (2 February 1745 – 1 July 1813) was an English preacher and coalheaver. He is said to have preached that "moral law" is unnecessary, a theological view known as Antinomianism. Huntington was a strict Calvinist who believed some were predestined to be saved and some were not. He was also convinced that he would be identified as a true prophet on Judgement Day. His unusual, polemical style of preaching and writing made him popular but brought conflicts with other preachers throughout his life. He founded or opened chapels throughout England, many of which survive including Bethlehem Chapel, Richmond upon Thames.

== Biography ==
William Huntington was born in 1745 near Cranbrook in Kent, and was given the name William Hunt at his baptism there five years later. It is said that his father was Barnabus Russel – his mother's husband's employer – despite his mother's marriage to William Hunt. He was the tenth child of Elizabeth Hunt and the only male to achieve maturity. He had an unsuccessful romance with Susannah Fever, from which a child was born. He left the Kent area and changed his name. Now William Huntington he was free from his financial obligation, but not his conscience. He changed his surname to Huntington in 1769, his rationale was that the "-ing" represented the present participle in words representing sinful activities, such as "stealing" and "swearing", and "ton" referred to his being "a vessel of the Lord". Later that year, he married Mary Short, a servant, they moved to Mortlake in Surrey and Huntington resumed his gardening work. Nevertheless, he was still very poor.

He did attend a number of schools, but it was always as a result of charity. He said himself that he was frequently hungry. He was the son of a farmworker and he undertook work that was unskilled or semi-skilled, such as driving hearses and coaches, gardening and heaving coal. He also spent some time as a tramp.

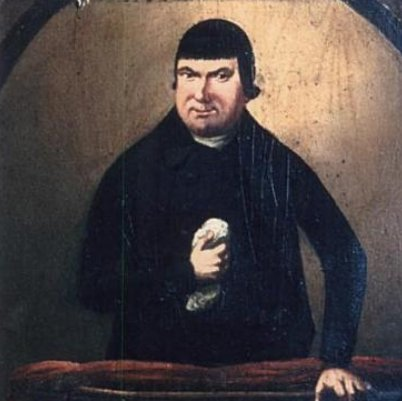
Huntington's portrait from his chapel in Lewes

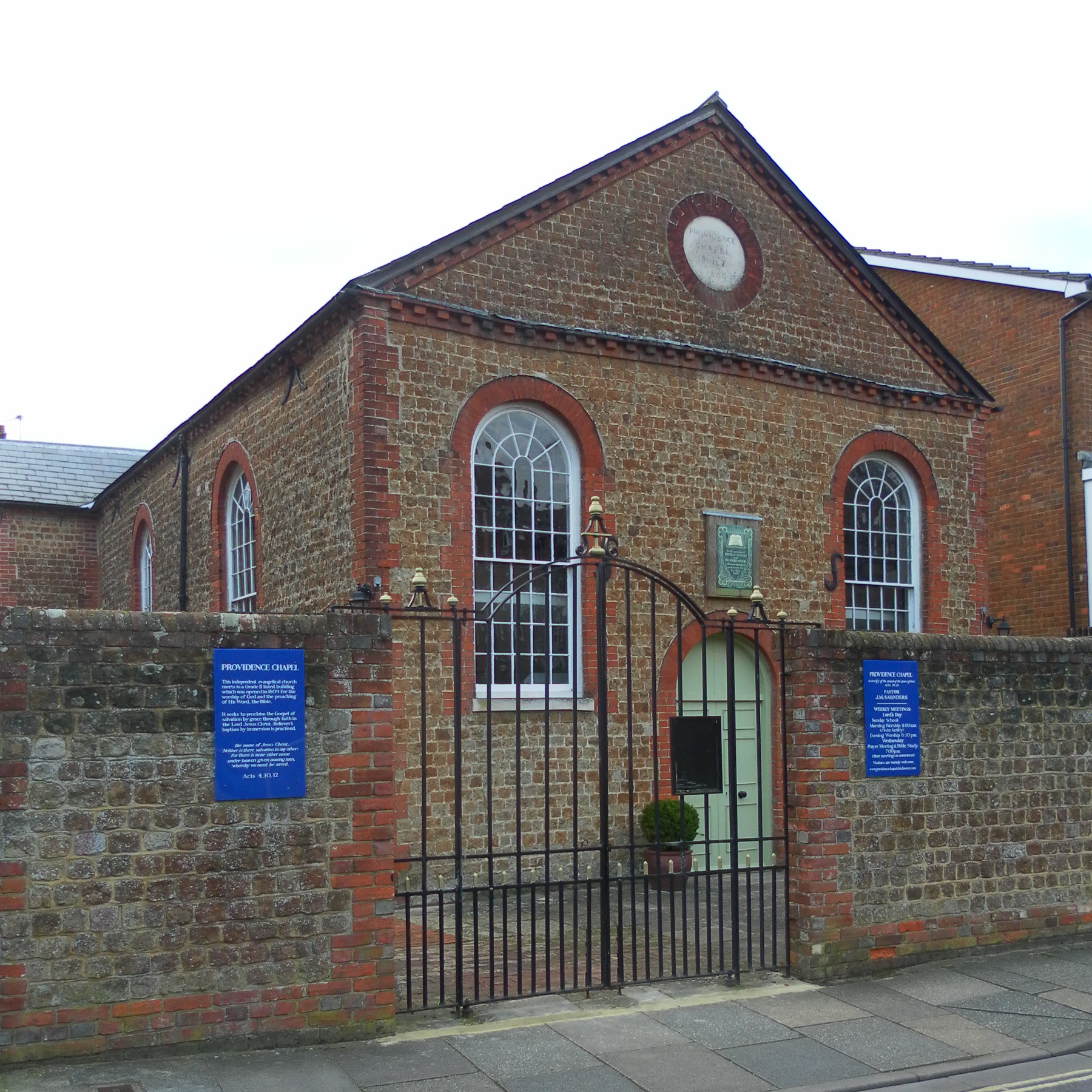
Providence Chapel in Chichester

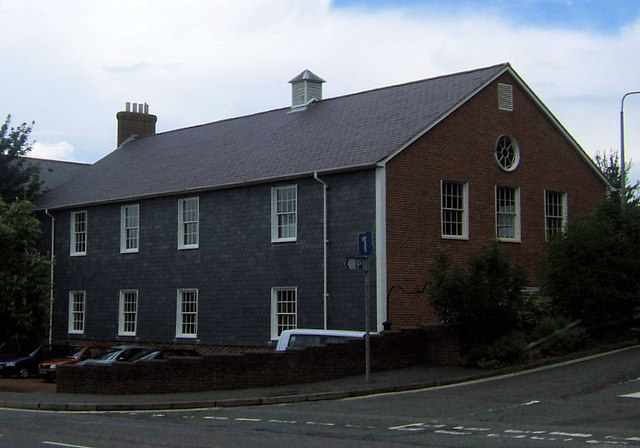
Jireh Chapel in Lewes

In 1773, Huntington and his wife moved to Sunbury-on-Thames in Middlesex. Soon afterwards he reported that he had been contacted by Christ. The vision, which appeared as a bright light from which Christ's bloodied body emerged, told him that he was brought under the covenant love of God's elect. He became dissatisfied with his existing religious beliefs, and began to associate with Baptists, Methodists and Calvinists in various Surrey and Middlesex towns. He became known locally for his Biblical knowledge and preaching, and he established his first congregation at Thames Ditton in Surrey, where he was a Baptist. He then had an independent group in Woking, also in Surrey. By the 1780s, Huntington preached at a large circuit of chapels across Surrey, Sussex and London: for example, he was involved in the early days of Bugby Chapel, a Calvinistic chapel founded in 1779 in Epsom, and of Five Ash Down Independent Chapel, founded in 1773 in East Sussex. His ongoing poverty, exacerbated by the loss of his coalheaving job, forced him to walk long distances every week. He controversially claimed that Divine Providence alleviated his poverty at this time by occasionally supplying money, food and a horse.

In 1782, he received another message – prophesy upon the thick boughs – and moved to London, where he established a chapel on Titchfield Street. Providence Chapel was consecrated in 1783, and became very popular: hundreds or sometimes thousands of people attended his ministry, including Princess Amelia and members of the nobility—although Huntington himself preferred preaching to poorer people. His preaching style was evangelising, and he was known for preaching that the so-called moral law was the "ministration of condemnation" (2 Corinthians 3:9) rather than the rule of life for believers, for which he was accused of Antinomianism, among others by the Baptists John Ryland and Maria De Fleury. Huntington has been identified as the "most egregious" proponent of Antinomianism.

Huntington's "Broken Cistern" gives his views about Antinomianism:

"I will not say that the authors of this book are Antinomians, but this I will say, that the book contains the worst Antinomianism that I ever read, and is a vile and damnable harangue, both against the law, the gospel, and the grace of God. Against the law, because it declares, the law has ceased to exist, and is done away, as a covenant of works. Against the gospel, because it is no rule of right or wrong. And against the grace of God, by declaring that the new man is taken captive by sin."

This quotation, from Huntington's sermon "Moses Unveiled in the Face of Christ", is another example of Huntington's views on Antinomianism.

"A real Antinomian, in the sight of God, is one who 'holds the truth in unrighteousness', who has gospel notions in his head, but no grace in his heart. He is one that makes a profession of Christ Jesus, but was never purged by his blood, renewed by his Spirit, nor saved by his power. With him carnal ease passes for gospel peace, a natural assent of the mind for faith, insensibility for liberty, and daring presumption for the grace of assurance. He is alive without the law, the sentence of the 'moral law' having never been sent home to him. The 'law of faith' was never sealed on him, the 'law of truth' was never received by him, nor the 'law of liberty' proclaimed to him. He was never arraigned at, nor taken from, the 'throne of judgement'. He was never justified at the 'throne of grace', nor acquitted at the 'bar of equity'. The tremendous attribute of righteousness was never seen or felt by him. The righteousness of the law was never fulfilled by him, the righteousness of faith was never imputed to him, nor the fruits of righteousness brought forth by him. He is an enemy to the power of God, to the experience of the just, and to every minister of the Spirit, and is in union with none but hypocrites, whose uniting ties are 'the gall of bitterness and the bonds of iniquity'. He is one that often changes his opinion, but was never changed in heart. He turns to many sects and parties, but never turns to God. In word he is false to Satan, in heart he is false to God, false to Satan by uttering truth, and false to God by a false profession. He is a false reprover in the world, and in the household of faith a false brother. He is a child of Satan in the congregation of dissemblers, and a bastard in the congregation of the righteous. By mouth he contends for a covenant that cannot save him, and in heart he hates the covenant that can. His head is at Mount Calvary, his heart and soul at Mount Sinai. he is a Pharisee at Horeb, and a hypocrite in Zion. He is a transgressor of the law of works, and a rebel to the law of faith, a sinner by the ministry of the letter, and an unbeliever by the ministry of the Spirit. As a wicked servant, he is cursed by the eternal law, and, as an infidel, he is damned by the everlasting gospel. And this is a real Antinomian in the sight of God.”

During his time in London, Huntington's reputation grew, and he opened chapels elsewhere. In 1805 he was invited to be the preacher at a new chapel in Lewes in Sussex. Jireh Chapel had been founded by Jenkin Jenkins, who had left his previous church in the town after a dispute with the congregation. Huntington, who had already added "S.S." to his own name to indicate that he was a sinner who was saved, added "W.A." to Jenkins' name, which he said stood for "Welsh Ambassador". Elsewhere, Huntington founded four chapels in the East Midlands in 1806, the Providence Chapel in Chichester—whose interior was installed in 1809, and which is still extant as of 2009—and another chapel in Bristol the following year.

Huntington and his wife lived in the Paddington area of London at first, but as their wealth grew they were able to move to a large villa in nearby Cricklewood. Mary, with whom Huntington had 13 children, died on 9 December 1806. Huntington then married the former Lady Elizabeth Sanderson (widow of Sir James Sanderson bt a former Lord Mayor of London). Lady Sanderson, who continued to use that name after marriage, died in 1817.

In 1810, the Providence Chapel in Titchfield Street burnt down. Huntington, who by this time was wealthy, raised about £10,000 to build a new, larger chapel. The new chapel was built in Gray's Inn Road and the first service was held there on 20 June 1811.

Huntington died in 1813, after which various preachers served the chapel, but following the death of Huntington's former assistant Rev'd Algar Lock in 1835, the non-conformist services ceased. The building was reopened as an Episcopal (Anglican) chapel, becoming the district church of St. Bartholomew in 1860. The church was destroyed during the bombing of London in the Second World War.

Huntington was buried at the Jireh chapel in Lewes beside Jenkin Jenkins who had died in 1810. The inscription, which he composed only a few days before he died, reads "Here lies the coalheaver who departed his life July 1st 1813 in the 69th year of his age, beloved of his God but abhorred of men. The omniscient Judge at the grand assize shall ratify and confirm this to the confusion of many thousands, for England and its metropolis will know that there has been a prophet amongst them."

== Writings ==
Huntington was a prolific writer and publisher of religious tracts, polemics, sermons and other pieces. His works and letters continued to be published after his death.

- The Kingdom of Heaven Taken by Prayer (1784)
- Epistles of Faith (Part 1, 1785)
- God the Guardian of the Poor and the Bank of Faith (Part 1, 1785)
- Living Testimonies (Part 1, 1794)
- The Naked Bow, or, A Visible Display of the Judgments of God on the Enemies of Truth (1794)
- Light Shining in Darkness (1796)
- Epistles of Faith (Part 2, 1797)
- Correspondence between Noctua Aurita and Philomela (1799)
- God the Guardian of the Poor and the Bank of Faith (Part 2, 1802)
- Living Testimonies (Part 2, 1806)
- The substance of the last or farewell sermon of the late Reverend William Huntington, SS (1813, posthumous)
- The Sinner Saved: a memoir of the Rev. William Huntington (1813, posthumous)
- Gleanings of the Vintage (1814, two volumes, posthumous)
- Posthumous Letters (1815, three volumes, posthumous)
- Posthumous Letters (1822, posthumous)
