= Sutton twin towns mural =

Mural by Rob Turner and Gary Drostle in London, England

Sutton twins towns mural
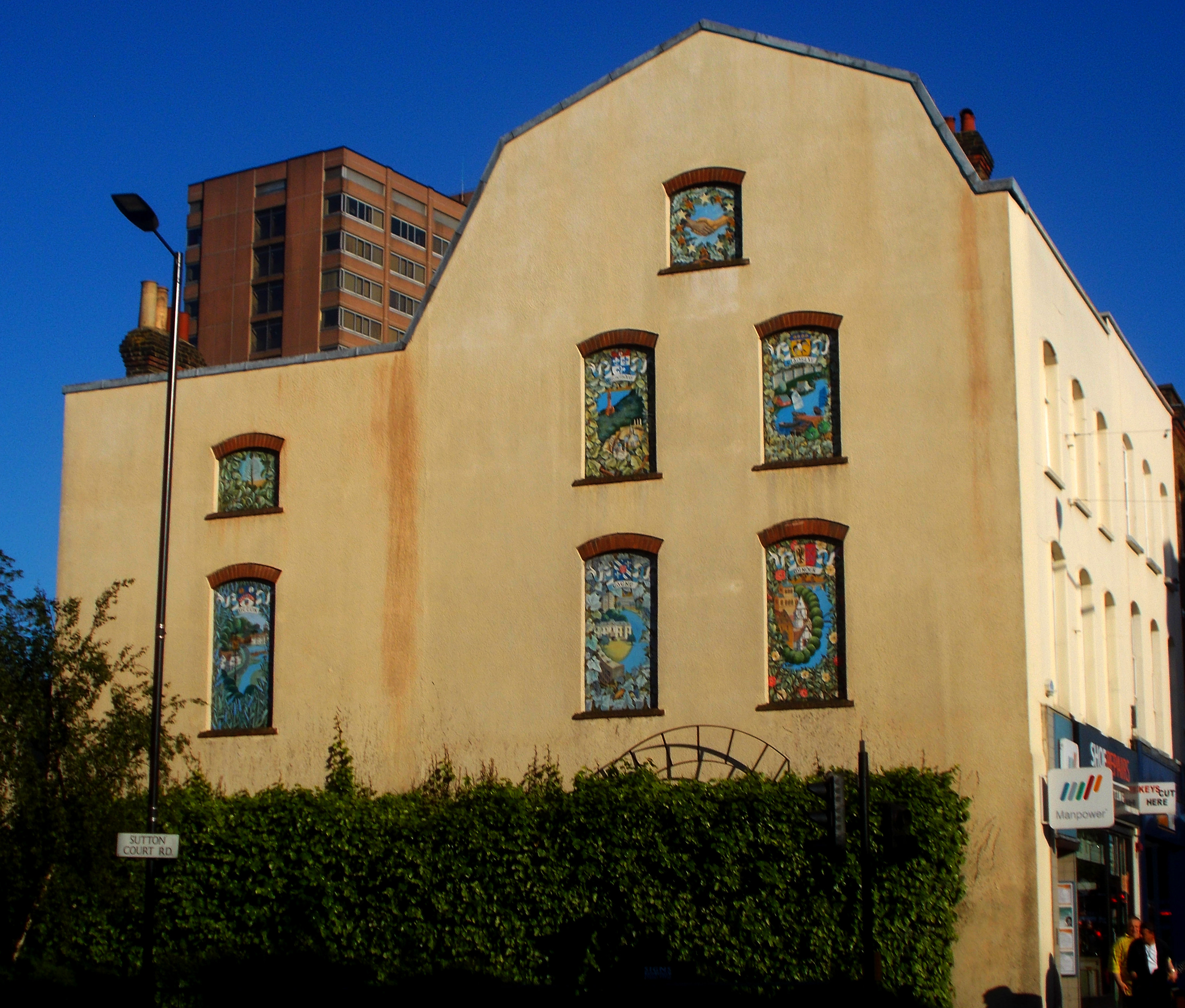
- Artists: Rob Turner and Gary Drostle
- Year: 1993
- Medium: Plywood
- Subject: Mural
- Condition: Good
- Location: Sutton; 51°21′37.5″N 0°11′29.6″W

The Sutton Twin towns mural is a large mural in the form of seven individual paintings situated in Sutton High Street in the town of Sutton in Greater London, England. It is one of six works of public art in Sutton town centre.

== Design and location ==
The mural was created in 1993 by two Public artists Gary Drostle and Rob Turner on the 25th anniversary of Sutton's twinning in 1968 with Wilmersdorf in Berlin. Seven individual paintings make up the mural. It is positioned along the north flank of a Victorian commercial building at the southern end of the High Street near the train station at the junction with Sutton Court Road. The paintings are on plywood and inset within seven mock window frames. The paintings depict scenes of the London Borough of Sutton and its four European twin towns: Gagny, a suburb of Paris in France; Gladsaxe, a suburb of Copenhagen in Denmark; Minden in North Rhine-Westphalia in Germany; and Charlottenburg-Wilmersdorf in Berlin in Germany. (There is also a "friendship link" with Tavarnelle, which is 16 miles south of Florence in Italy.)

The twin towns mural was commended by the Sutton and Cheam Society in 1994. Drostle and Turner also produced the Sutton heritage mosaic.

== Mural features ==
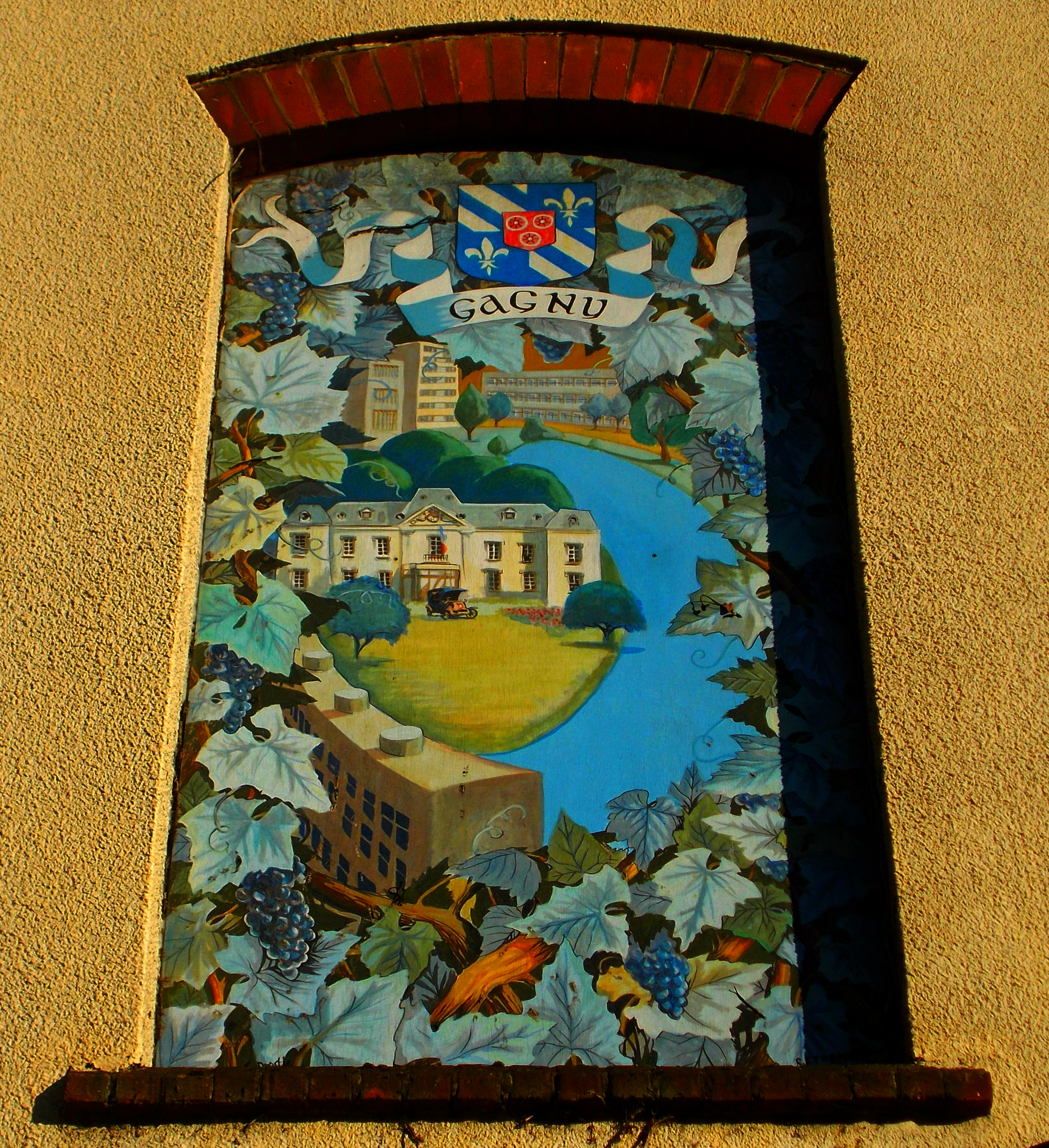
The painting of Gagny

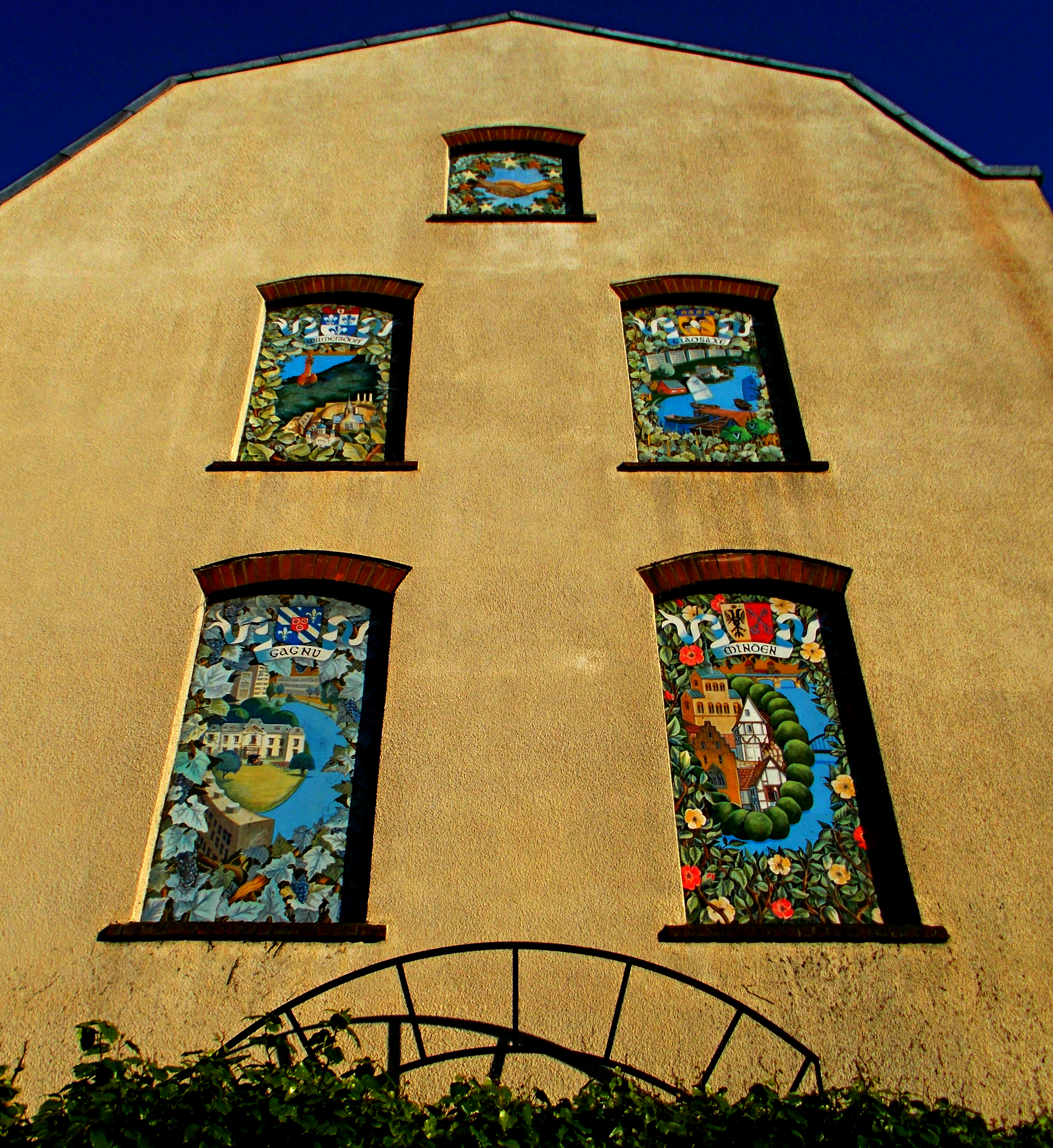
Sutton twin towns mural

The five main paintings show a number of the main features of their respective areas, along with the heraldic shield of each above the other images. Each painting also features a plant as a visual representation of its subject's environmental awareness. In the case of Sutton this is in a separate smaller painting (above its main one) showing a beech tree, intended as a symbol of prosperity and from which Carshalton Beeches in the borough derives its name.

The artists involved pupils from Sutton schools and community groups in the early designs; each group dealt with a different town. Sutton's mural painting shows a range of its most well known landmarks, including Whitehall in Cheam, Carshalton Ponds, Honeywood House and the spire of Trinity Church in Sutton town centre. Gagny's shows the Hôtel De Ville, an ancient manor surrounded by a garden. The mural for Gladsaxe shows Bagsværd Lake, Bagsværd Church and Højgârd. Minden's mural features its cathedral, the Westerorbrücke bridge and the Mittelandkanal Aqueduct.

== 2011 information board ==
The Sutton Council determined to erect "a new information board... to tell people the story of the murals." In 2011 it was installed by the local council in the street facing the mural outside the Cock and Bull pub. Councillor Graham Tope, explained the purpose of the new sign:

These murals are an important part of our borough's history and I think it's fitting that people should be able to learn more about them. The borough's first European ties were established in 1968 ..... twinning continues to be a noteworthy part of the borough's identity.

== Engagement with twin towns ==
In November 2015 the Mayor of Sutton sent condolences to its twin town Gagny, Paris following the terrorist attacks on Paris that month.

In September 2016 French folk dance group L’Aubade de Quercy from Gagny joined their UK counterparts, Pennyroyal Clog Dancers and the East Surrey Morris Men, in Trinity Square, Sutton town centre.

== See also ==
- Sutton Heritage Mosaic
- Sutton armillary
- The Messenger (sculpture in Sutton)
