= List of public art in the London Borough of Sutton =

This is a list of public art in the London Borough of Sutton.

== Beddington ==
Image	Title / subject	Location and coordinates	Date	Artist / designer	Type	Material	Designation	Notes
	Mosaic	Beddington Park, in front of the dovecot to the east of the East Lodge	?	?	Mosaic		—N/a	

== Belmont ==
Image	Title / subject	Location and coordinates	Date	Artist / designer	Type	Material	Designation	Notes
More images	Belmont War Memorial	Junction of Station Road and Queens Road 51.3439°N 0.2023°W	1921	E. P. Archer	Memorial cross	Stone	Grade II	Unveiled 1 January 1921.

== Carshalton ==
Image	Title / subject	Location and coordinates	Date	Artist / designer	Type	Material	Designation	Notes
More images	Carshalton War Memorial	Honeywood Walk, Carshalton Ponds	1921	Attributed to E. H. Bouchier	War memorial	Portland stone	Grade II	
More images	Statue of Anne Boleyn	Junction of Pound Street and Church Hill	1967	Dennis Huntley	Architectural sculpture	Painted wood	—N/a	Unveiled 18 March 1987. Alludes to Anne Boleyn's Well, a spring nearby.

== Cheam ==
Image	Title / subject	Location and coordinates	Date	Artist / designer	Type	Material	Designation	Notes
More images	Cheam War Memorial	Cheam Library, Malden Road	1921	C. J. Marshall	Memorial cross	Portland stone	Grade II	

== Sutton ==
Image	Title / subject	Location and coordinates	Date	Artist / designer	Type	Material	Designation	Notes
More images	Benhilton War Memorial	All Saints' churchyard, Benhilton 51.3726°N 0.1934°W	c. 1920	?	Gabled cross	Stone	Grade II	
More images	Sutton War Memorial	Manor Park	1921	J. S. W. Burmester	Memorial cross	Portland stone	Grade II	
More images	The Messenger	Quadrant House, Sutton town centre	1981	David Wynne	Equestrian statue	Bronze	—N/a	
More images	Images depicting Sutton's twin towns in the form of seven individual paintings	Side wall of a commercial building in Sutton town centre	1993	Gary Drostle and Rob Turner	Mural	Artists Acrylic Paint	—N/a	
More images	Sutton's history and heritage	Trinity Square, on the side of Shinner & Sudtone	1994	Rob Turner and Gary Drostle	Mosaic mural	Vitreous ceramic tesserae	—N/a	
More images	Millennium Dial	Outside Waterstones bookshop, Sutton town centre	2000	?	Armillary sphere	Steel	—N/a	
More images	Transpose 2002	Langley Park Road / Carshalton Road, Sutton town centre	2002	Michael Dan Archer	Sculpture	Chinese granite and stainless steel	—N/a	
	Erykah Badu	Indepth House, Wellesley Road, Sutton town centre	2008	Eva Mena	Mural painting		—N/a	
More images	14 Wooden Animals (of which 9 remain)	Trinity Square and Throwley Road	2010	?	Carved Figures	Wood	—N/a	
	White Ribbon Promise Bench	Trinity Square below the Sutton Heritage Mosaic	2022	Samia Tossio and Hana Horack	Mosaic Bench	Vitreous ceramic tesserae	—N/a	

== Wallington ==
Image	Title / subject	Location and coordinates	Date	Artist / designer	Type	Material	Designation	Notes
More images	Beddington and Wallington War Memorial	Wallington Green	1922	?	War memorial	Portland stone	Grade II	
	English Lavender	Wallington town centre	1999	Guy Portelli	Sculpture	Bronze	—N/a	

== Bibliography ==
- Lloyd, Fran; Potkin, Helen; Thackara, Davina (2011). Public Sculpture of Outer South and West London. Public Sculpture of Britain. Liverpool: Liverpool University Press.
