= The Cock sign =

Street sign and lamp post in Sutton, London

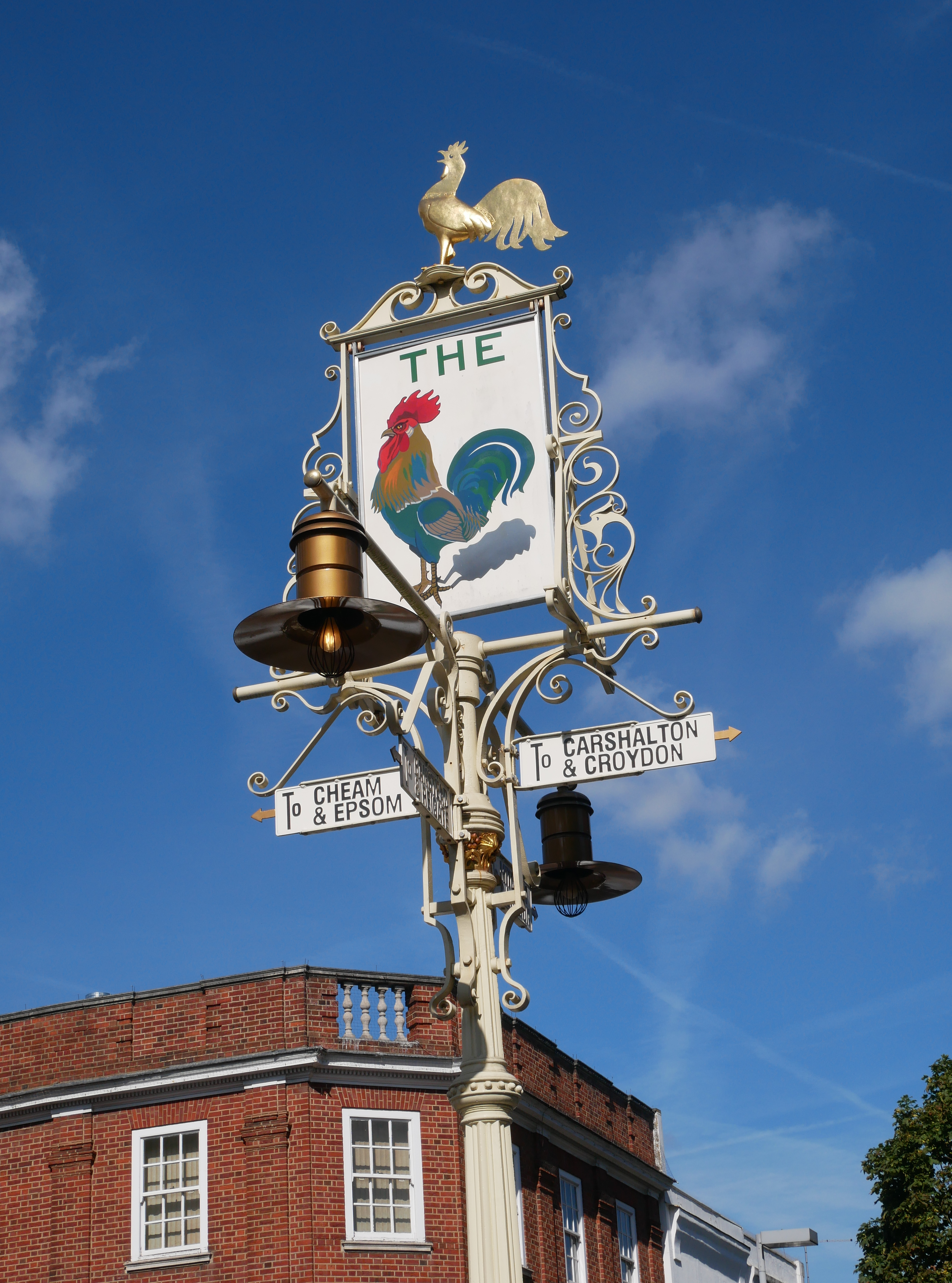
- The south face of the Cock sign
- Interactive map of the The Cock sign area

General information
- Location: Sutton High Street, London, England
- Coordinates: 51°21′40.3″N 00°11′31.4″W
- Construction started: 1907
- Relocated: c. 1915

Height
- Height: 3 metres (9.8 ft)

Design and construction
- Architecture firm: Hart, Son, Peard and Co.

Listed Building – Grade II
- Official name: The Cock sign on Sutton High Street
- Designated: 18 April 2018
- Reference no.: 1450261

The Cock sign is situated on the crossroads of Sutton High Street and Carshalton Road in the London Borough of Sutton. Built in 1907, it was originally a pub sign for The Cock hotel and pub, before being converted into a road sign and lamp post. Since 2018, The Cock sign has been a Grade II listed structure.

== History ==
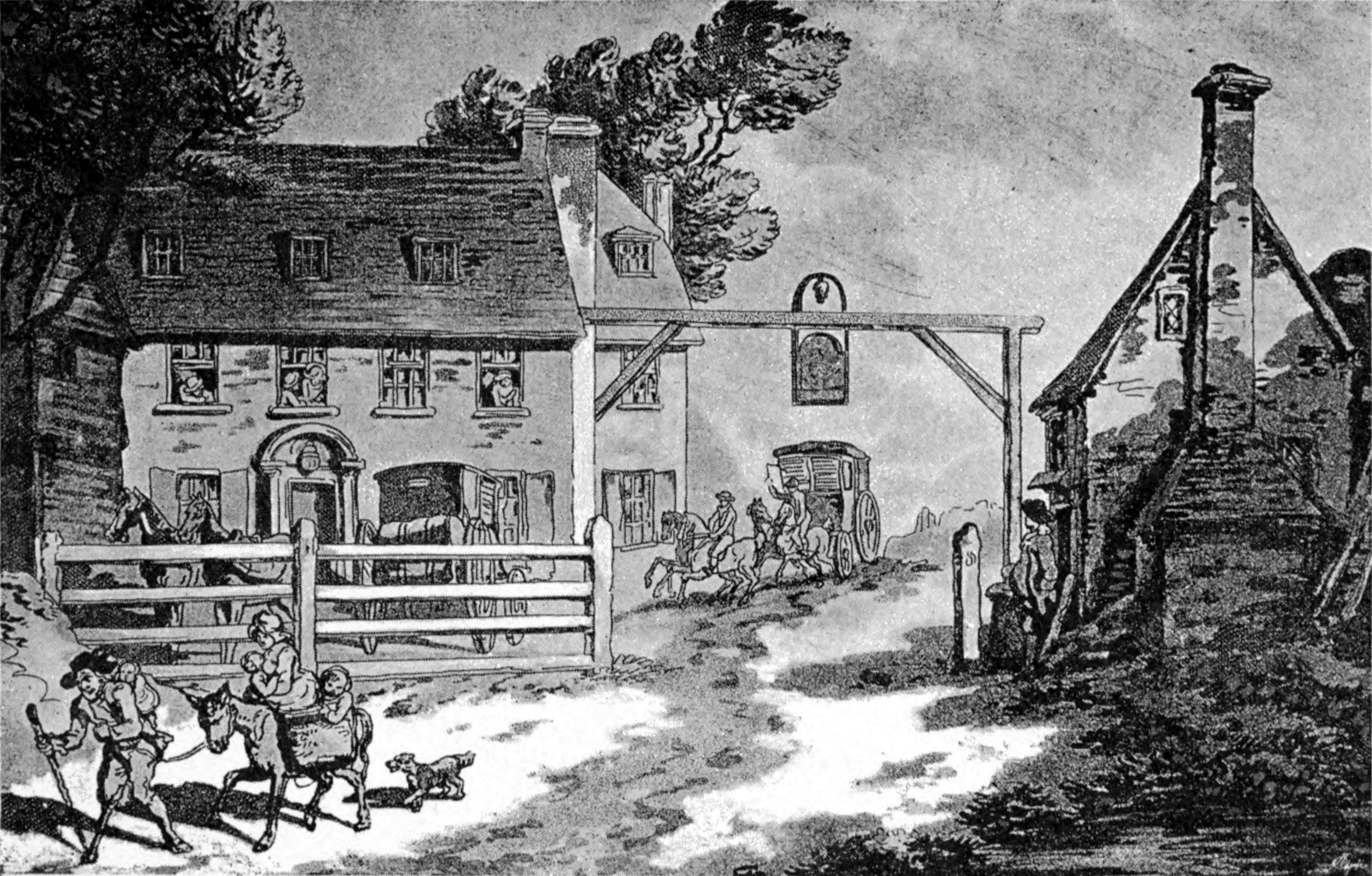
The original Cock Hotel in 1789. This hotel was partially demolished in 1898, before The Cock sign had been built.

The Cock Hotel in Sutton was so named as London and Sutton were an historic centre for cockfighting. It was on a main road from London to Brighton, and at one point in history, it was used as a post office. The hotel was at one time owned by boxer John Johnson, also known as "Gentleman Jackson", who earned the boxing title Champion of England. In 1898, the original Cock Hotel was partially demolished so that the street could be widened.

The Cock sign was built in 1907 by Hart, Son, Peard and Co. It originally stood on a timber frame outside The Cock Hotel and pub on Sutton High Street. When the hotel was completely demolished in 1914, the sign was moved to its present location on the crossroads of Sutton High Street and Carshalton Road. In around 1915, The Cock sign was converted into a road sign. At that time, the name of the hotel was removed from the sign.

The Cock sign is on a 3-metre-tall (9.8 ft) column, made out of steel and wrought iron. Originally the sign had a gas-lit light, and two lanterns. The light was later converted to use electricity, and the lanterns were removed before the sign was moved in 1915. The fingerposts on The Cock sign point to Cheam, Worcester Park, Carshalton, Croydon, Banstead, Reigate, Mitcham, and London. The road layout was changed in the late 20th century, but The Cock sign remained. The crossroads where the sign stands is known as The Cock crossroads, and is situated a few metres away from the location of The Cock hotel and pub. In 2018, The Cock sign became a Grade II listed structure. It was one of three places in South London that Historic England listed in 2018. In 2020, the sign was temporarily taken down for restoration work.
