= The Sound Lounge, London =

Concert venue

Coordinates: 51.3665°N 0.1944°W

The Sound Lounge
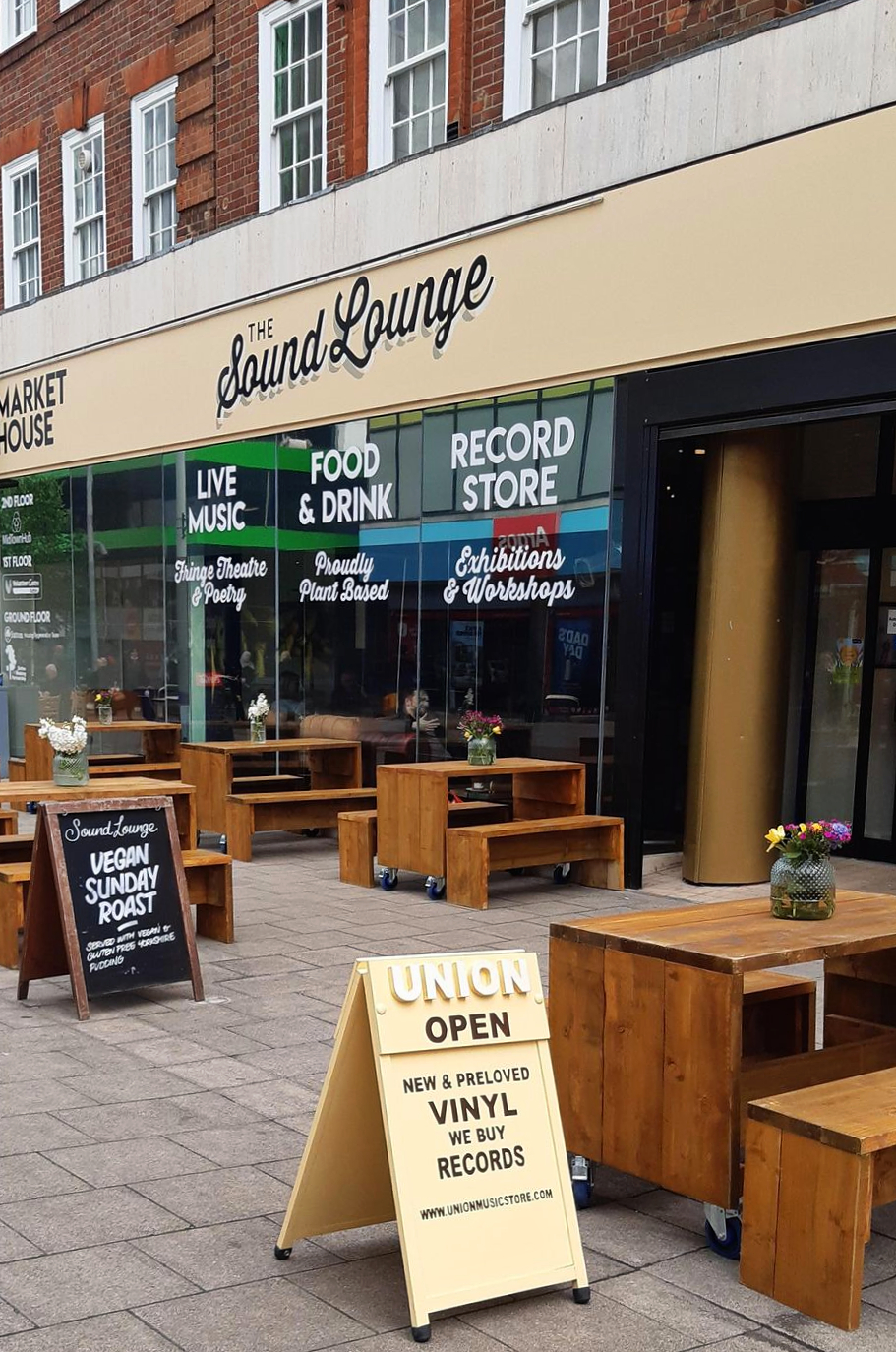
- The Sound Lounge exterior and outdoor seating area
- Interactive map of The Sound Lounge
- Location: 216-220 Sutton High Street, Sutton, London, SM1 1NU
- Public transit: Train: Sutton station. Buses: 80, 164, 280, S1

Construction
- Opened: 2020

Website
- thesoundlounge.org.uk

The Sound Lounge is a grassroots live music venue on Sutton High Street in Sutton, South London. The venue hosts live performances including blues, Americana, folk and roots music. It incorporates a plant-based, carbon-neutral café and a vinyl record shop, and, in addition to music, also hosts visual art exhibitions, theatre and dance.

== Locations, past and present ==
The venue's previous locations were first Merton Abbey Mills, then Tooting, then Wimbledon and then Morden before occupying the former premises of Sutton's Royal Bank of Scotland on Sutton High Street.

== Activities ==
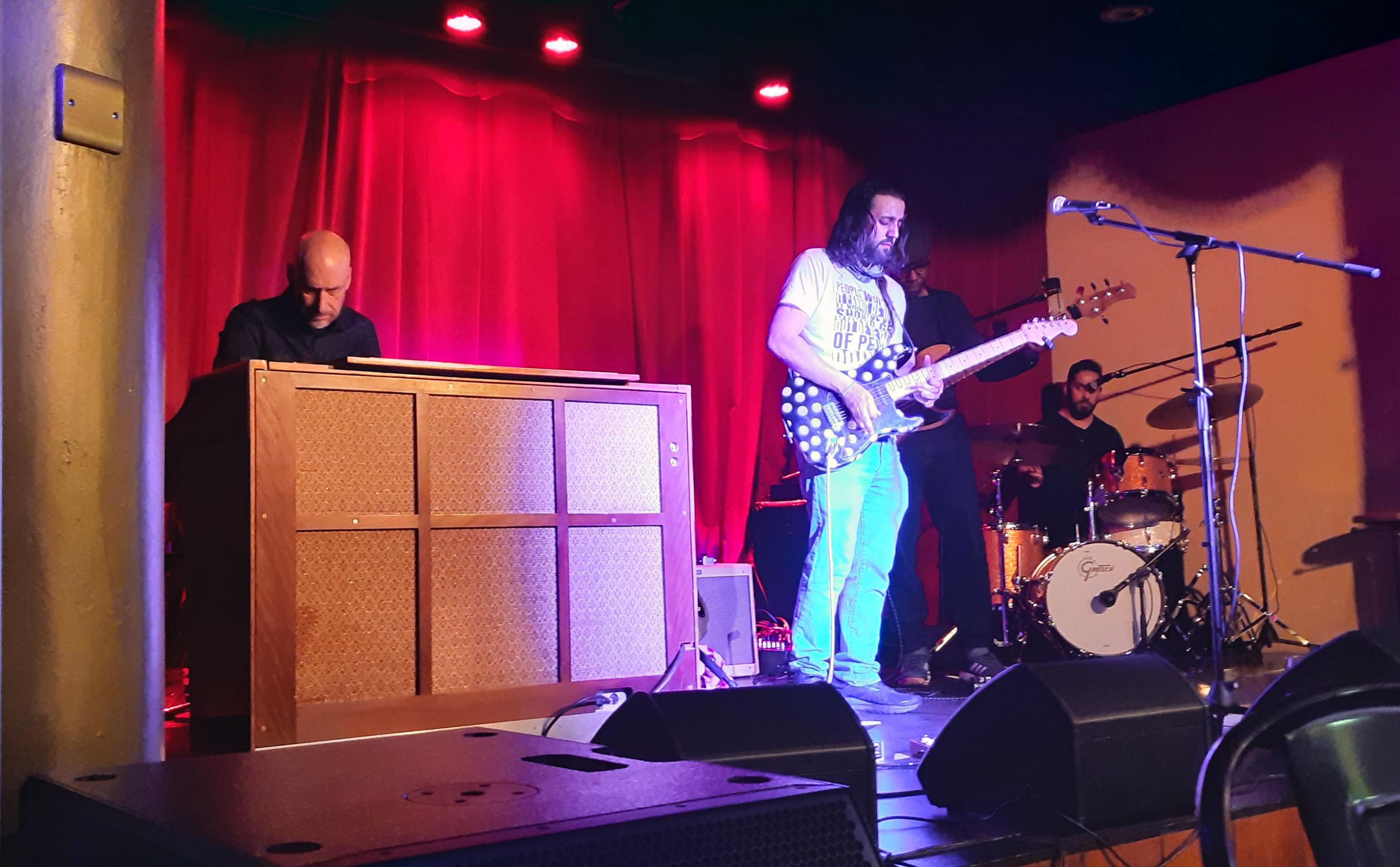
First performance after lockdown easing, in May 2021

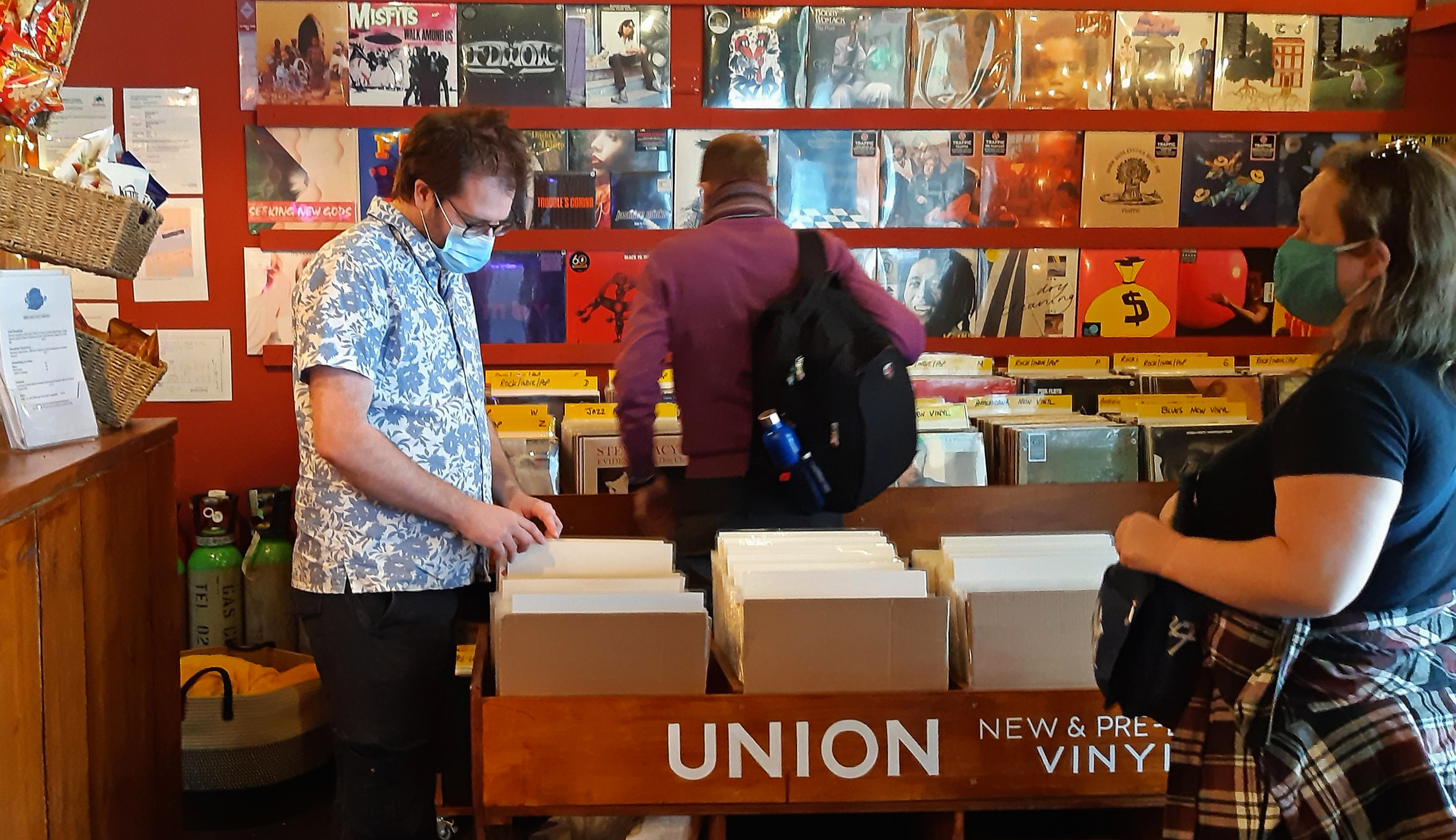
The Union record shop within The Sound Lounge

Following the easing of lockdown, the Sutton and Morden venues had a limited opening in April 2021 for outdoor food and drink consumption and, at the Sutton venue, vinyl record sales at the Union Music Store within. A women's theatre event took place in June 2021, and Sunday jazz afternoons with vegan roast are planned. In addition to its normal meal sales, the venue works in conjunction with Time Out Youth Project at the Sutton Life Centre to provide free meals for young people with food insecurity.

Additional initiatives include the installation of a community garden, free hot drinks for local residents suffering from social isolation, and activities for pre-school children. The venue also provide training for disadvantaged people aiming to become baristas and sound engineers.

== Carbon neutrality certification ==
On 1 July 2021 the venue became the country's first grassroots music venue to be certified as carbon neutral by the CarbonNeutral company. A wide variety of measures have been put in place to achieve neutrality. In addition to the fully plant-based menu for the café, the venue also obtains all of its energy from renewable sources, sends no waste to landfill and maintains an allotment garden on site for zero-carbon produce for the café.
