= Sutton High Street =

Street in Sutton, London, England

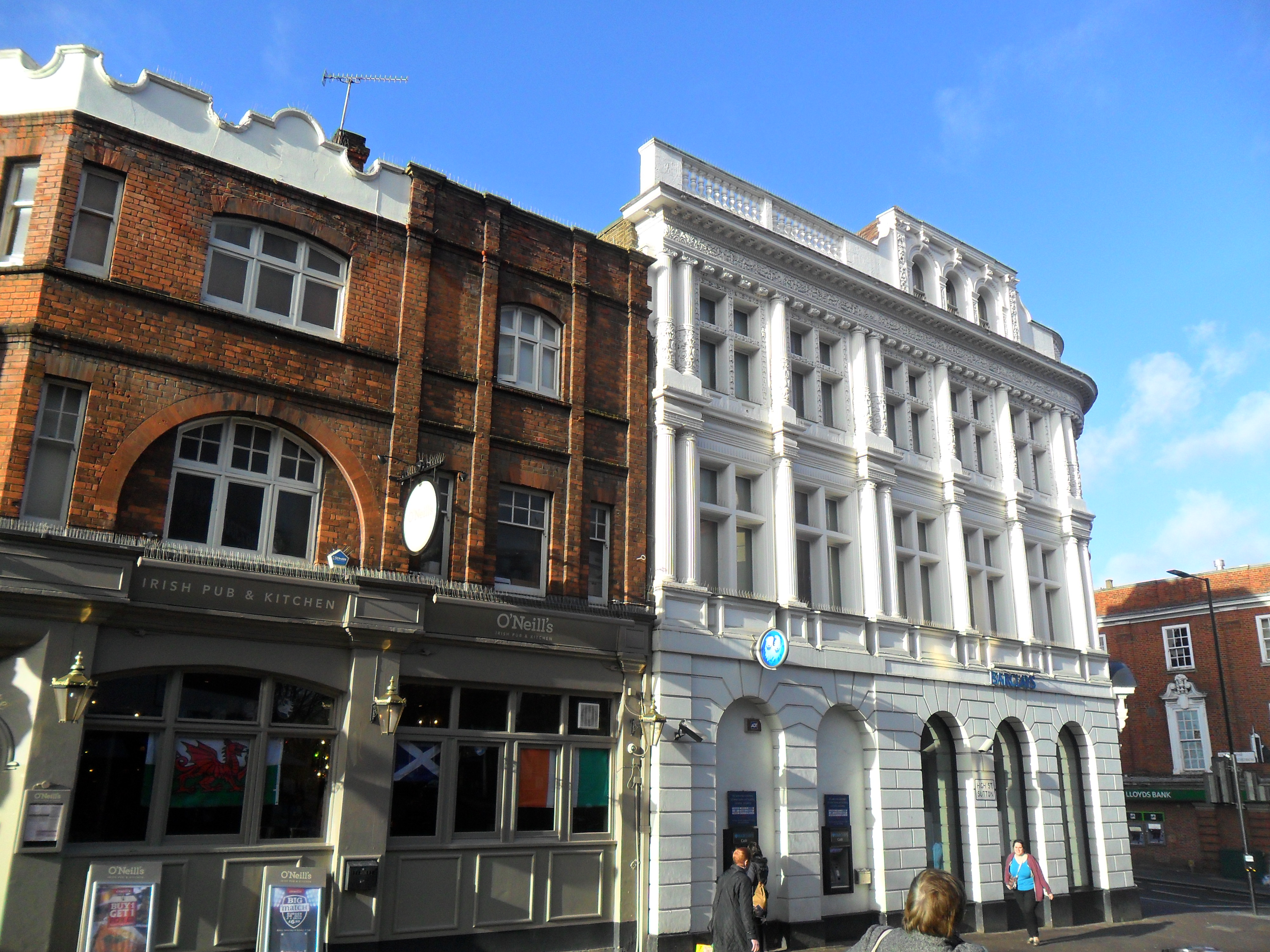
- A view of Sutton High Street within its Conservation Area section
- Interactive map of Sutton High Street
- Length: 0.9 mi (1.4 km)
- Postal code: SM1
- Coordinates: 51.36552°N 0.194094°W
- north end: Angel Hill; 51.3718°N 0.1945°W
- south end: Brighton Road; 51.3593°N 0.1913°W

Sutton High Street is a high street running north–south through the town of Sutton in the London Borough of Sutton.

The High Street area constitutes the sixth most important retail centre in London, and is home to many restaurants and major retail names. It is pedestrianised for most of its length, and a conservation area runs down a three hundred yard section. There are three examples of public art in the street, and parks at either end of it. In 2017 the High Street gained Heritage Action Zone status, the first in London to do so.

== History ==
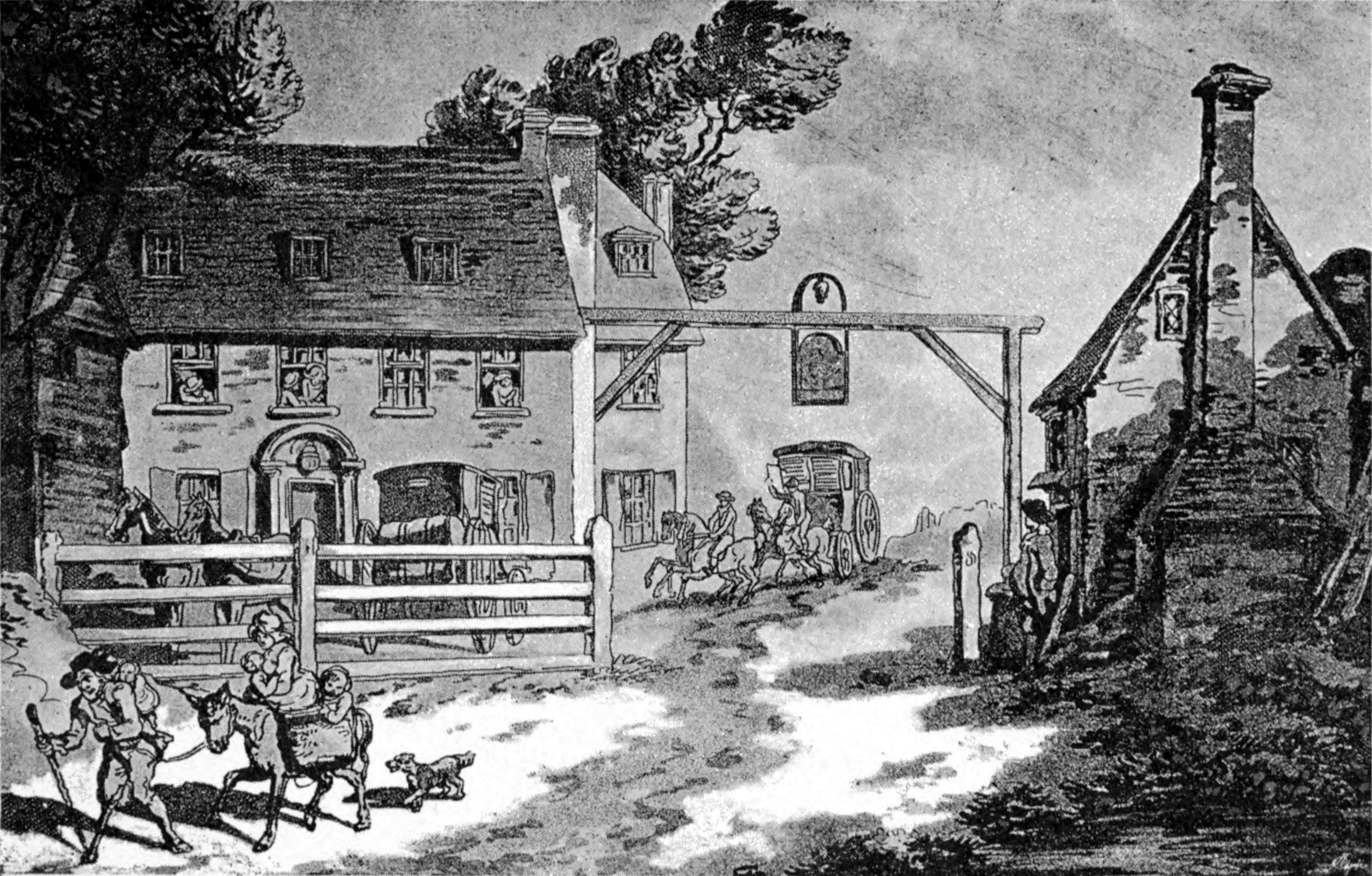
Painting of The Cock Inn by Thomas Rowlandson in 1789.

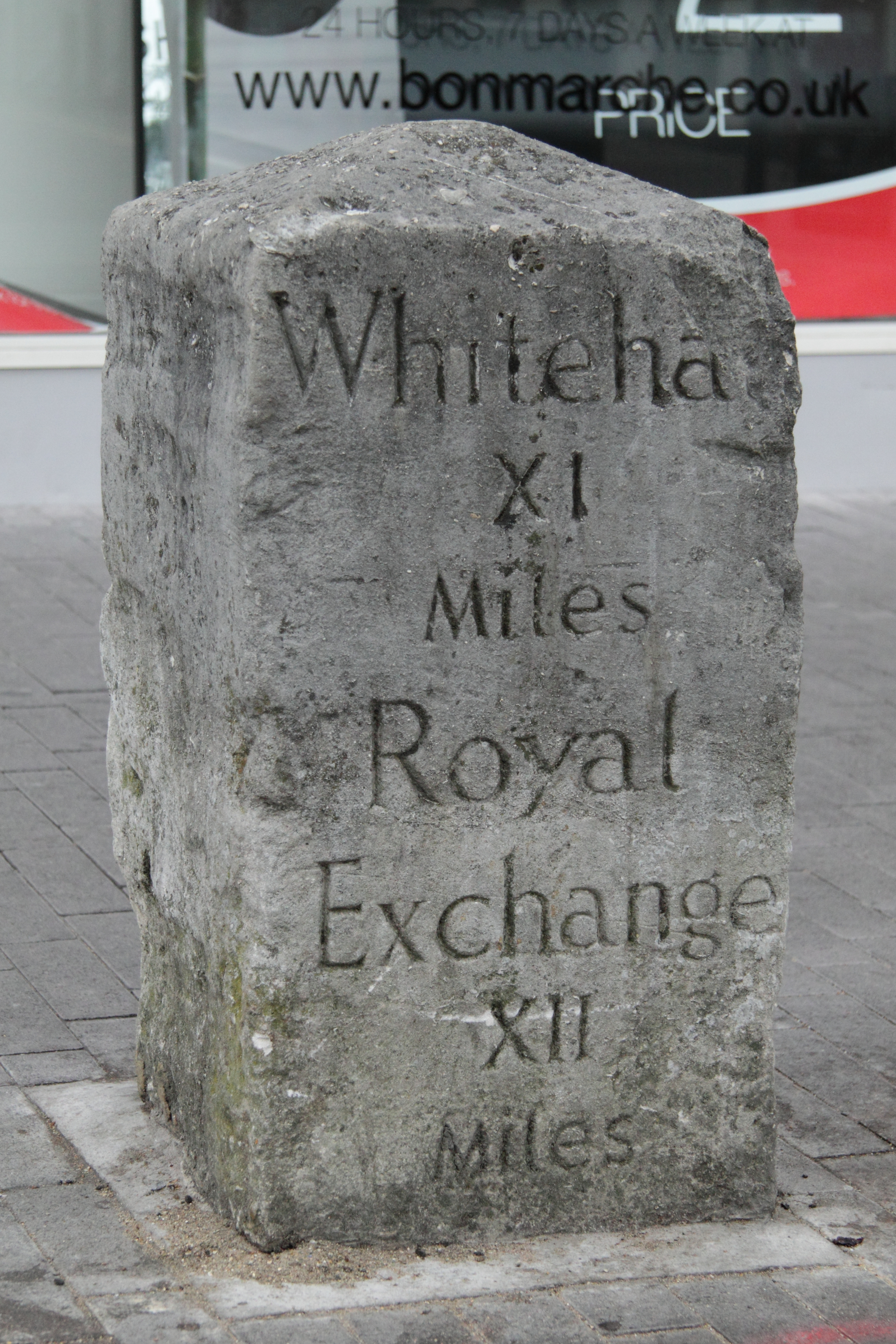
Milestone on Sutton High Street. This shows that Sutton is 11 miles by road from the administrative quarter of London (Whitehall) and 12 miles from the financial quarter (Royal Exchange)

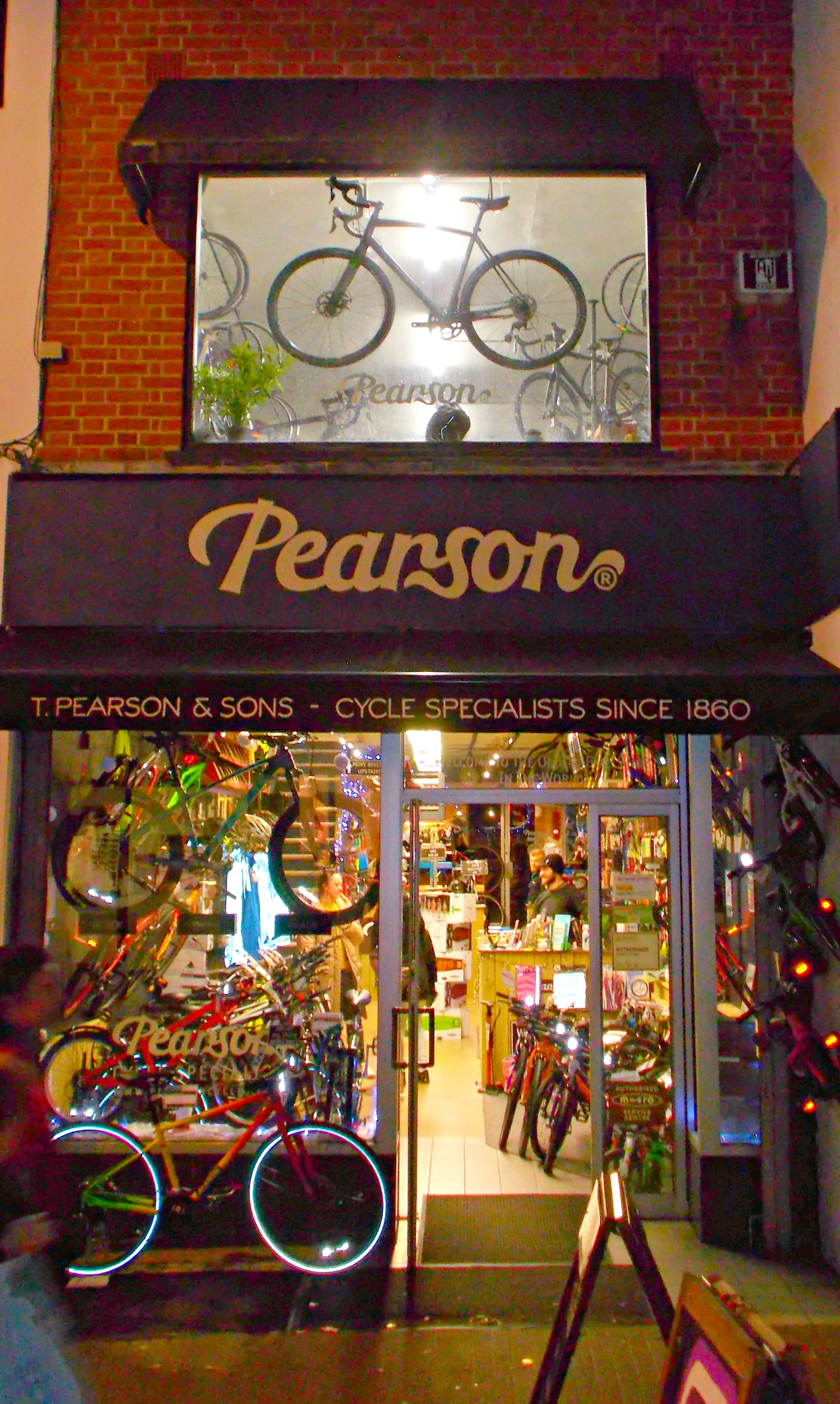
Pearson Cycles, the oldest cycle shop in the world

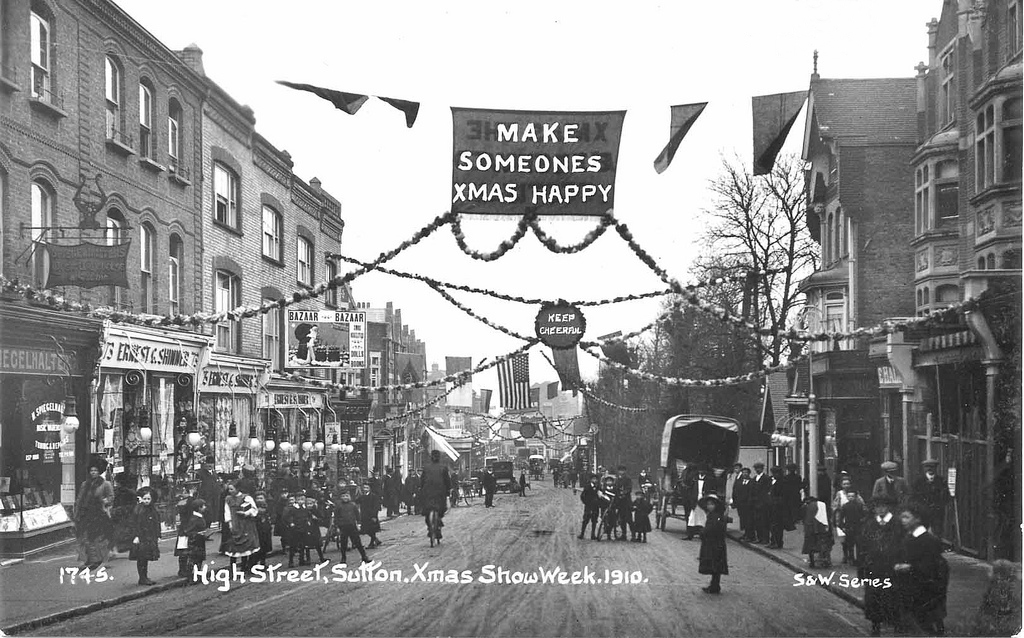

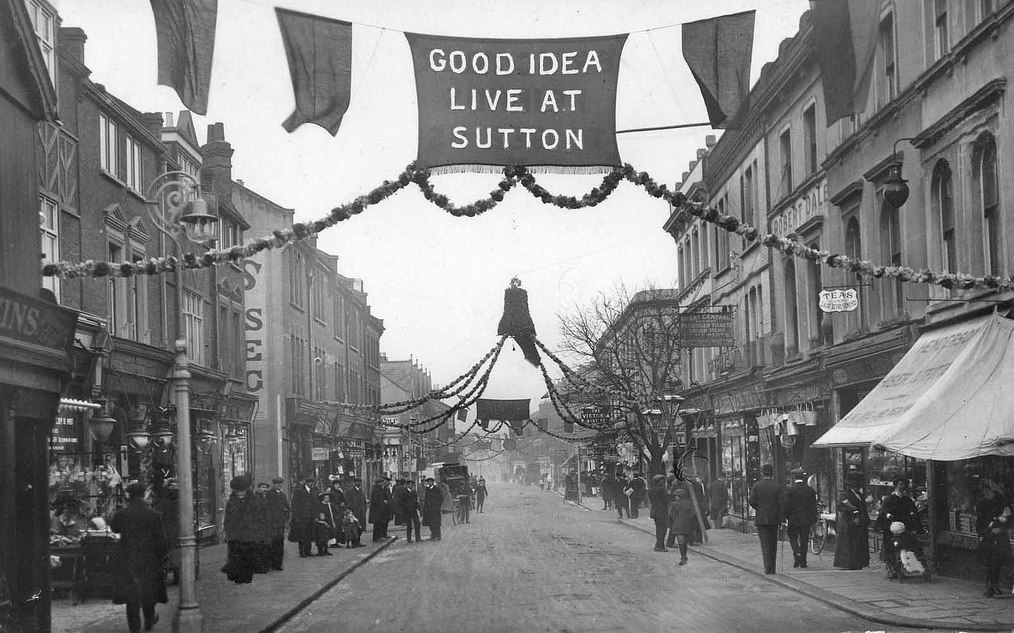
The High Street in Christmas 1910: south end (above); north end (below)

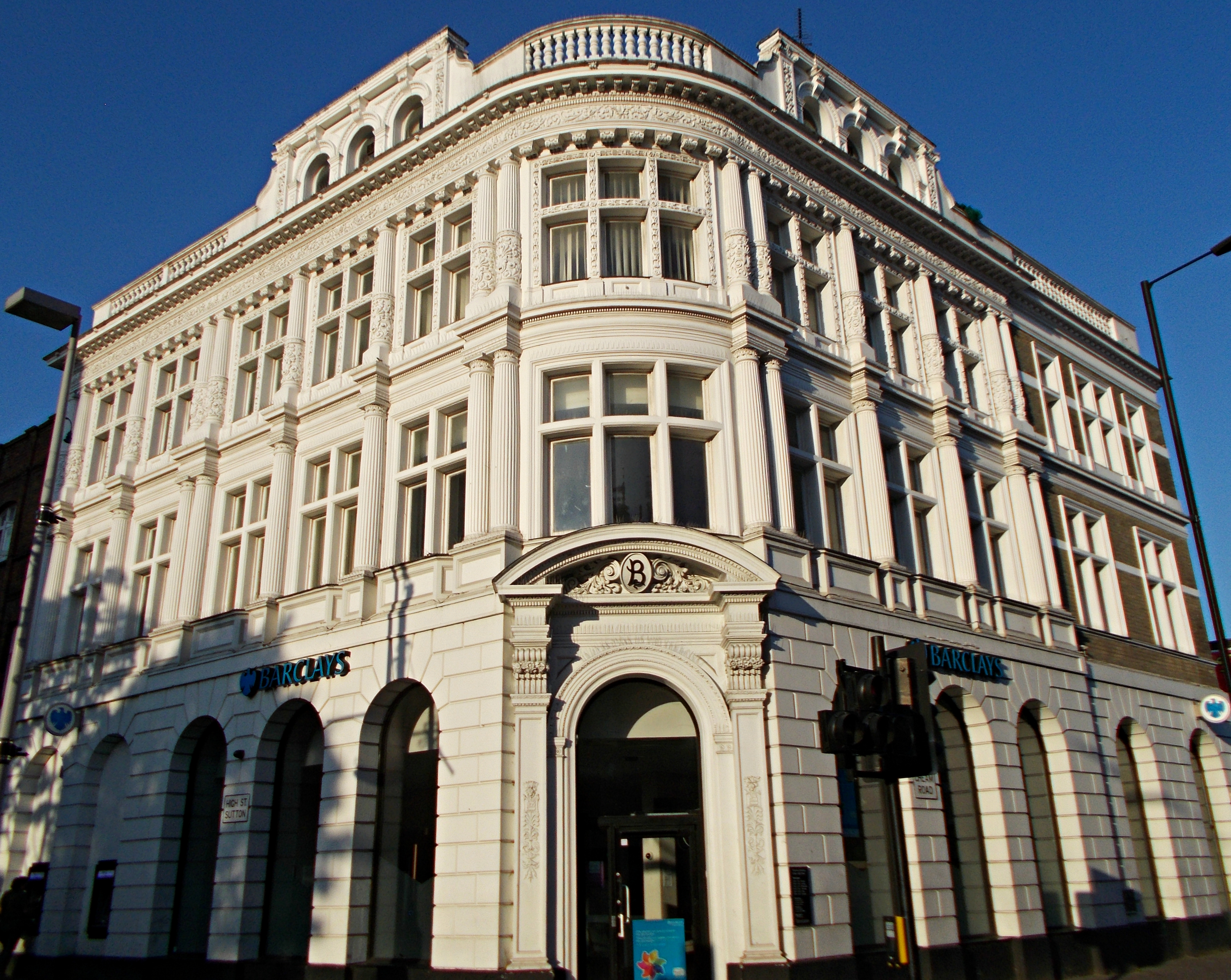
The Barclays Bank building

The section of road that is now Sutton High Street dates from the Middle Ages, and developed into part of the main road from London to Brighton. By the 18th century Brighton's popularity as a coastal resort was growing, and the route was well used, but not yet regularly maintained. This was put right in 1755 when the enacting of turnpike legislation provided a means for the road's better maintenance. This, combined with its intersection with the east-west Carshalton/Cheam Road, led to the development of a small settlement around the tollhouse in what is now the centre of the town. By the beginning of the 19th century Sutton had become a fully-fledged village, and the road was dotted with a number of houses, pubs and shops from Sutton Green southwards up to the Cock crossroads. The road was used frequently by the Prince Regent to access Sutton Lodge on Brighton Road, and, being the main route to Epsom Downs, it was also heavily used by visitors to The Derby. In 1801 the population of the town stood at 579, at that point lower than the other settlements in the borough. However, by 1861 it had risen enough to make Sutton the largest settlement in the borough.

Their position on the London to Brighton turnpike provided the village's two large coaching inns, the Cock and the Greyhound, with trade serving coaches travelling through the village. The Cock Hotel's sign straddled the Brighton road, and its proprietor was the champion pugilist, "Gentleman" Jackson. The building was demolished in 1898, shortly after a new Cock Hotel had been constructed on a directly adjacent site to the north. Twenty horse drawn carts passed up and down this stretch in a day. Regular contact beyond the town brought both expansion and sophistication. Small businesses opened up, at first directly related to travellers on the turnpike – bakers and brewers to feed visitors, seamstresses to provide running repairs, leather workers to make or mend harnesses – and then to provide trade goods for neighbouring communities.

When the railway arrived, Sutton's people had become travellers themselves. The population of Sutton grew and the village turned into a town. The High Street near the top was known as Cock Hill until the 1880s – the shops on the east side were built in 1880, ten years later than those on the west side.

A notatable building to appear around this time was the grand and decorative 1894 London and Provincial Bank building (now home to Barclays Bank), which stands over the historic crossroads. It is four storeys tall and forms a prominent landmark when arriving in the town centre from a westerly direction. There is a series of arches at ground level, and the main entrance is on the corner where the two roads meet, rounded in shape and surrounded by an ornate architrave and segmental pediment.

By 1900 the High Street had become heavily built up. By the late 1930s the shops had altered, but the buildings above remained much the same. One new building at this time was Ernest Shinner's new department store, which replaced a Baptist church that had been built in 1886. This later became a branch of Allders.

A long lasting retail business in Sutton dated back to the 1860s – Pearson Cycles was originally a blacksmith shop, but in the 1890s changed to bicycle making and repair. The Pearsons run the cycle business from the same High Street location to 2020 It has been recognised by Guinness World Records as the oldest bicycle shop in the world., when the branch was closed

== Conservation Area and Heritage Action Zone ==
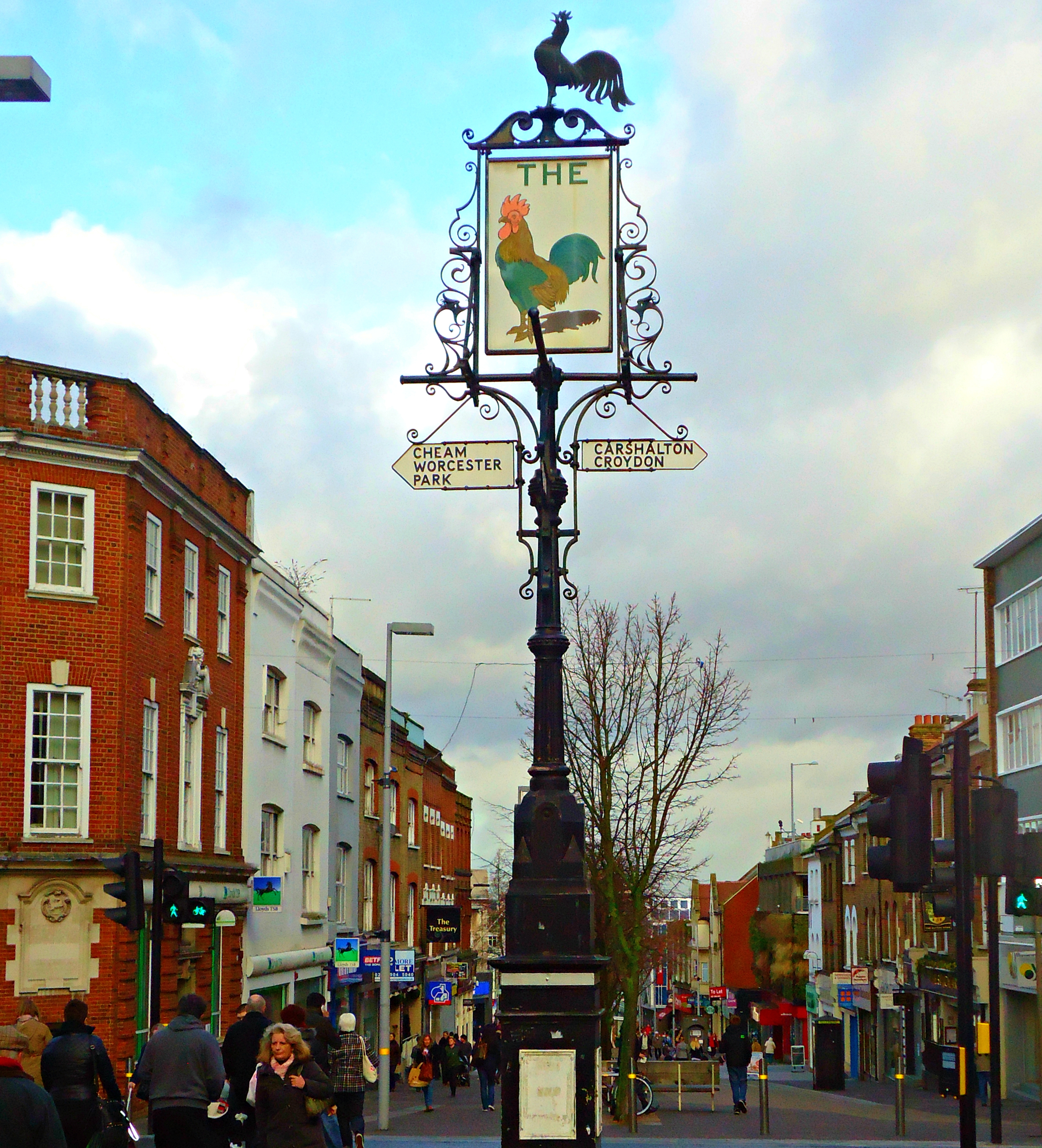
Pub sign overlooking Sutton High Street at the historic crossroads

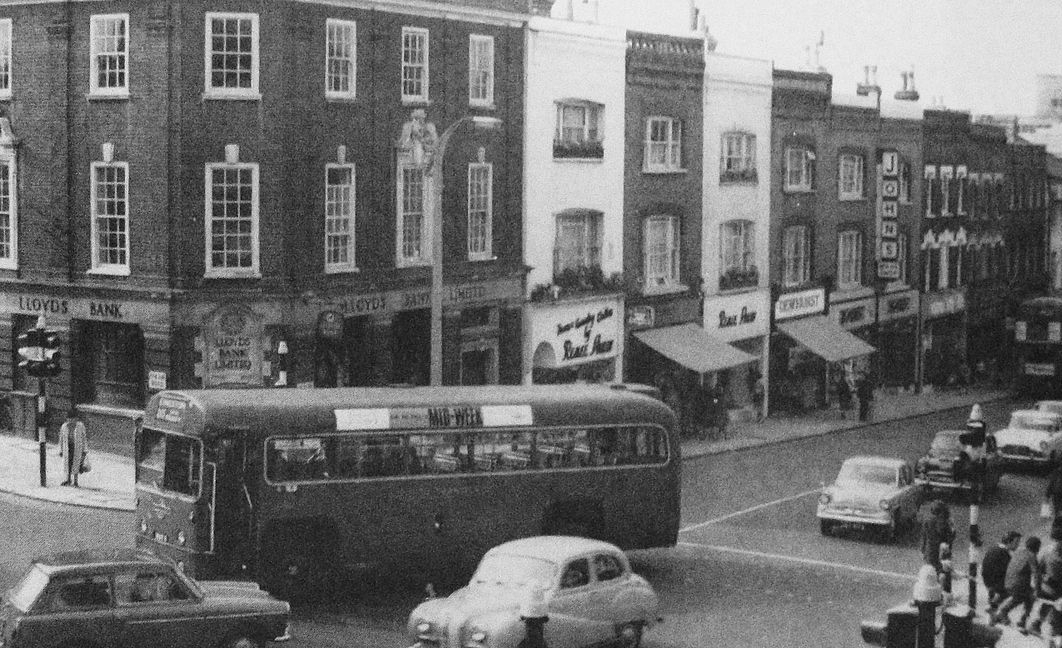

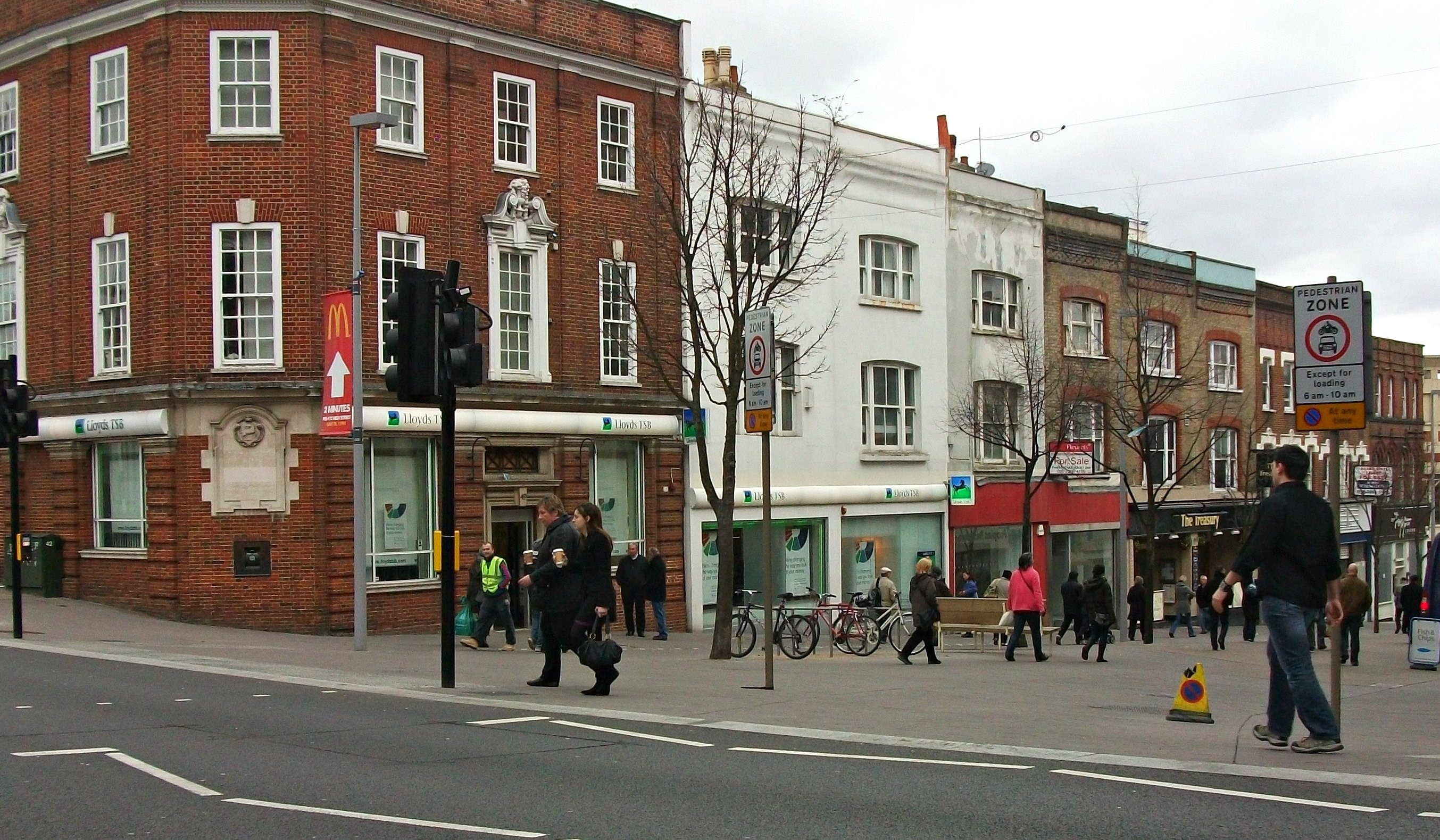
Sutton High Street in 1960 and 2011

The high street includes a conservation area, the Sutton Town Centre High Street Crossroads Conservation Area, which was designated on 9 May 2011, following a review of the town centre, which highlighted the historic importance of the highway network at the crossroads of Cheam Road/Carshalton Road and the High Street, as well as the associated buildings and spaces. The conservation area focuses on the area around the historic crossroads, and stretches from the Station down to Trinity Square. The local authority noted that the buildings, especially their upper storeys, were worthy of preservation and enhancement. Its report concluded that Conservation status was warranted on the basis of the historic importance of the area together with its architectural and aesthetic merit. The designation would enable the provision of guidance to landowners and developers on maintaining and improving the historic aspects of the area.

Gordon Rookledge in his "Sutton Architectural Identifier" remarks on the "vivid, Victorian, polychrome brick and stone façades" in his description of Sutton High Street.

Heritage Action Zone

In March 2017 it was announced that Sutton town centre had been designated one of the first ten Heritage Action Zones by Historic England. Gaining this status will unlock resources to enhance the historic environment, including the conservation area, with the aim of encouraging economic growth. Heritage will be made a central consideration for new developments in the area, so as to retain the town's distinct architectural nature.

== Landmarks ==
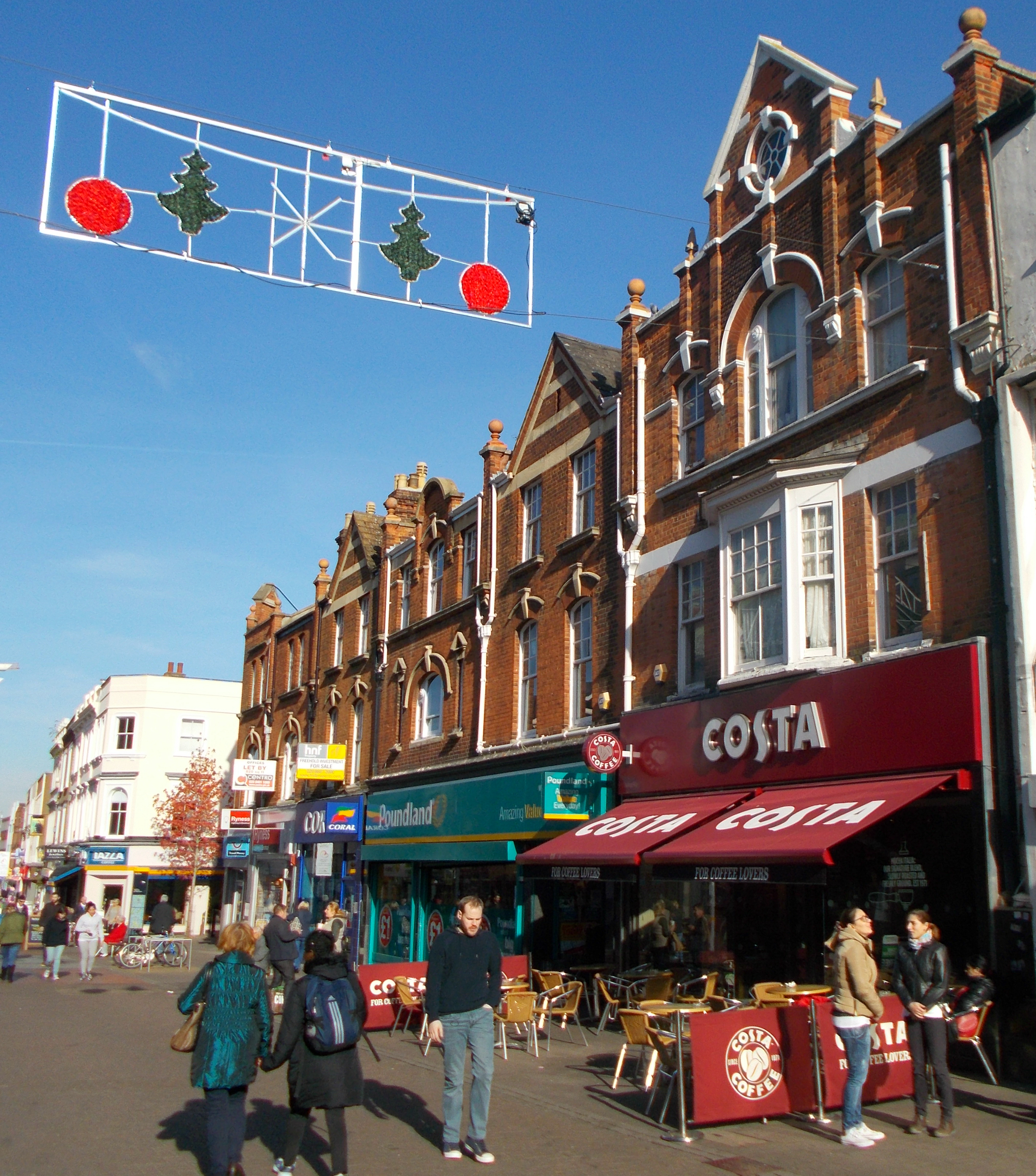
Sutton High Street

Sutton High Street began as a shopping street in Victorian times and in 2014 was London's sixth most important retail centre, attracting shoppers from a wide area. It is often the chosen location for new retail ventures. Many of the country's main High Street names are represented in the central area, as are banks, building societies and estate agents.

Sutton High Street has in recent decades gained two covered shopping centres, both of which are situated in the central High Street area:

- The larger of these is the St. Nicholas Centre, opened in 1992 with three main levels, and five levels to provide space for a department store.
- Times Square is the smaller of the two. It opened in 1985, and was granted planning approval for a refit in June 2014; the work was completed in 2017. The refit was assessed as being a "high quality refurbishment scheme which will make a significant contribution towards the regeneration of this part of the Town Centre." It is expected to attract further major high street names.

=== St Nicholas Shopping Centre ===
The St Nicholas Shopping Centre in Sutton, London, opened in 1992. It is a prominent retail destination in the area, featuring three main levels and five levels to accommodate a department store. The centre has been a significant part of Sutton’s retail landscape, offering a mix of high street names and independent retailers.

In recent years, the centre has faced challenges due to the changing retail environment. In 2021, Sutton Council purchased the leasehold interest of the site, aiming to redevelop it into a modern retail, leisure, and community hub. The redevelopment plans include high-quality retail spaces, new homes, and improved community facilities, reflecting the evolving needs of the local population.

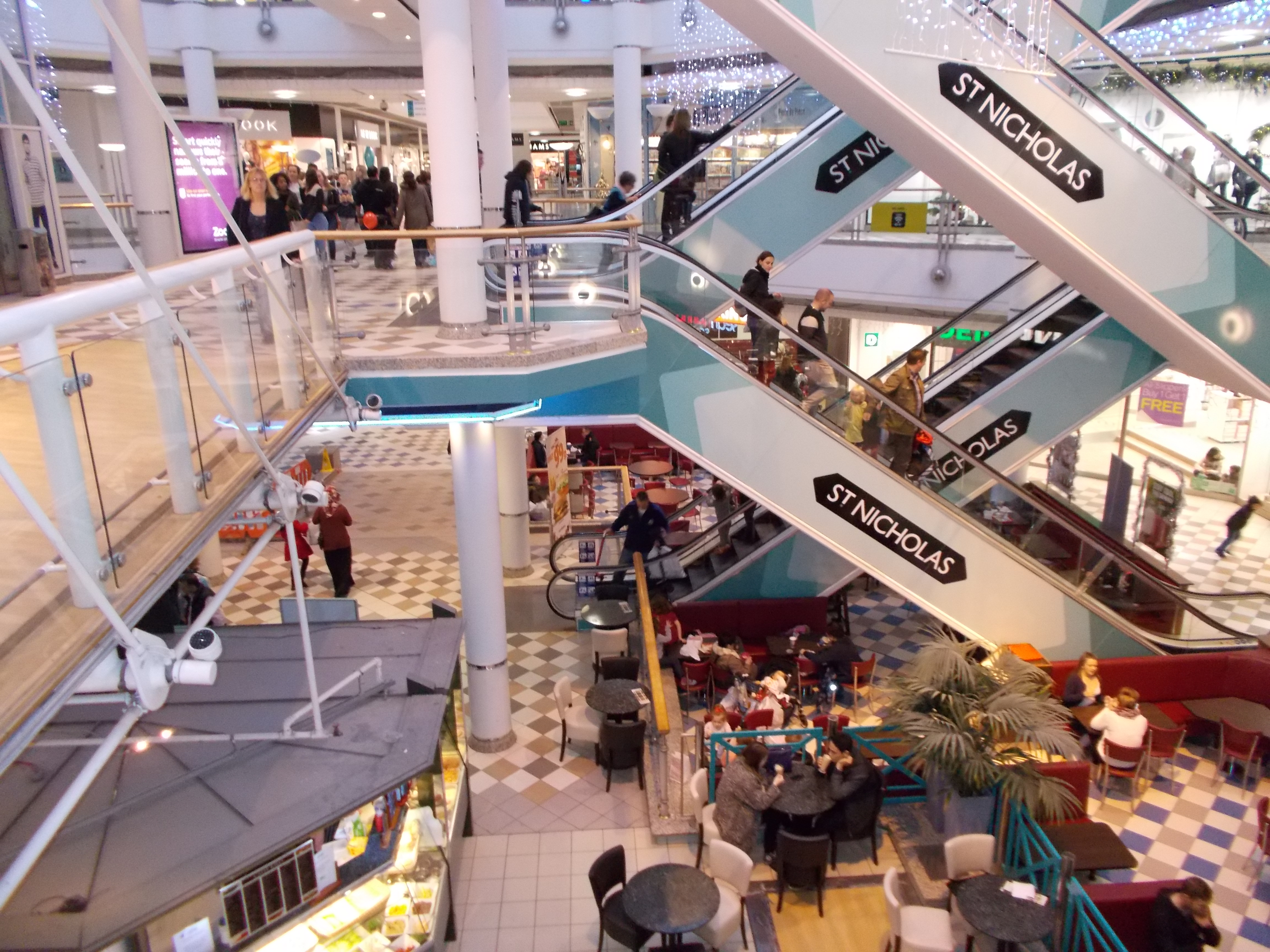
St Nicholas Centre, Sutton, London

This includes the search for a development partner to redevelop the existing St Nicholas Shopping Centre, Civic Offices, Gibson Road car park, and the vacant Secombe Theatre sites. The redevelopment aims to create a town centre with retail spaces, new homes, and public facilities. The Council’s vision includes a new Civic Hub on the High Street, which will house council offices, a library, and spaces for community activities and events. This initiative is part of a broader effort to enhance Sutton’s appeal as a place to live, work, and visit, leveraging its transport connections and status as a hub for cancer research.

=== Restaurants and bars ===
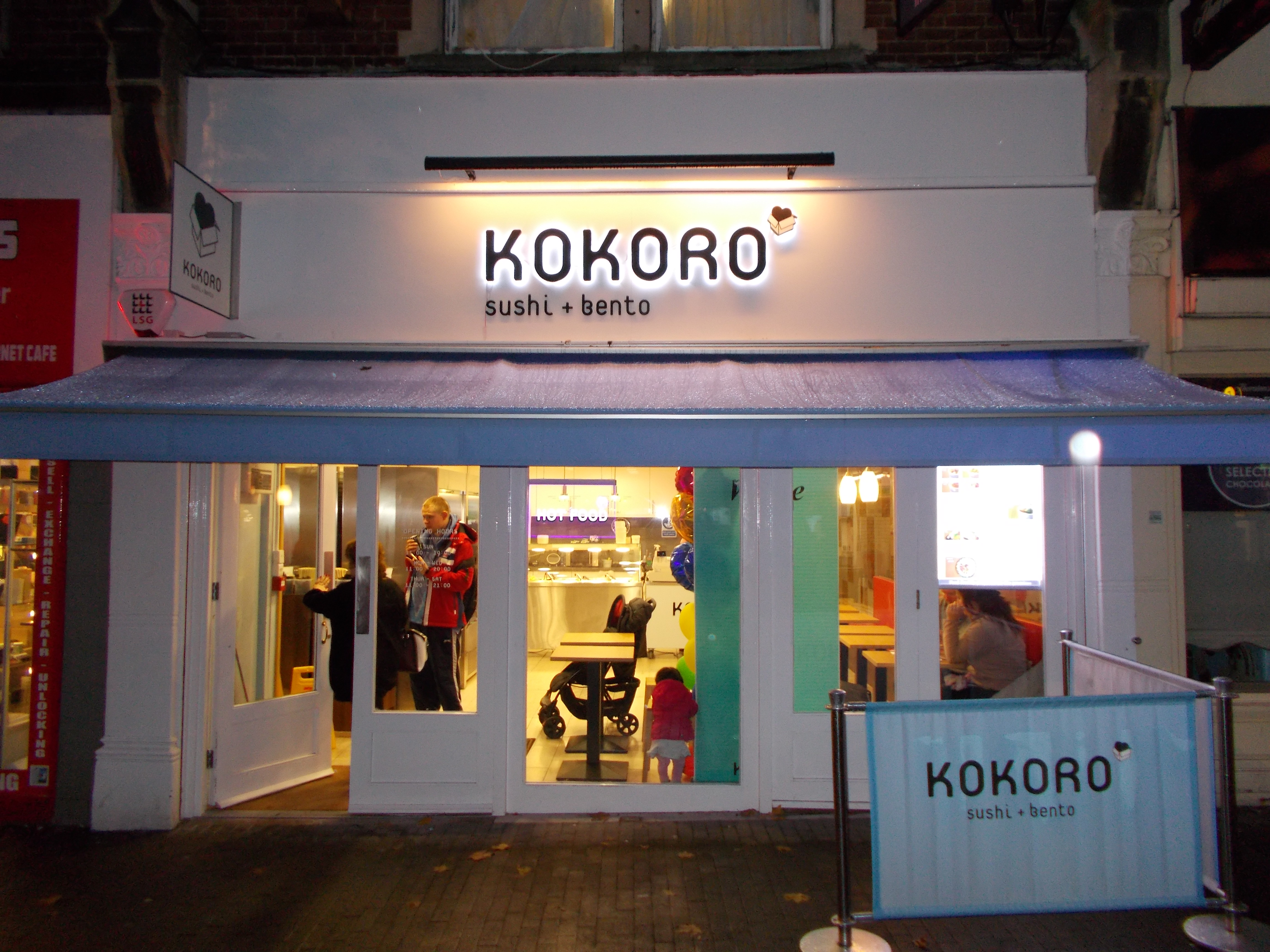
A Japanese restaurant

The Sutton High Street area also has a number of restaurants, patisseries, coffee houses, gastro pubs and cafe bars. The central area is pedestrianised, facilitating the setting up of outdoor tables by several establishments.

Sutton's range of restaurants has expanded in recent years, with culinary offerings from around the world including French, Spanish, British, Mexican, Malaysian, Thai, Pakistani, Portuguese, Turkish, Japanese, Italian, Indian and Chinese cuisine These include a French restaurant which is listed in The Good Food Guide and is Michelin-listed.

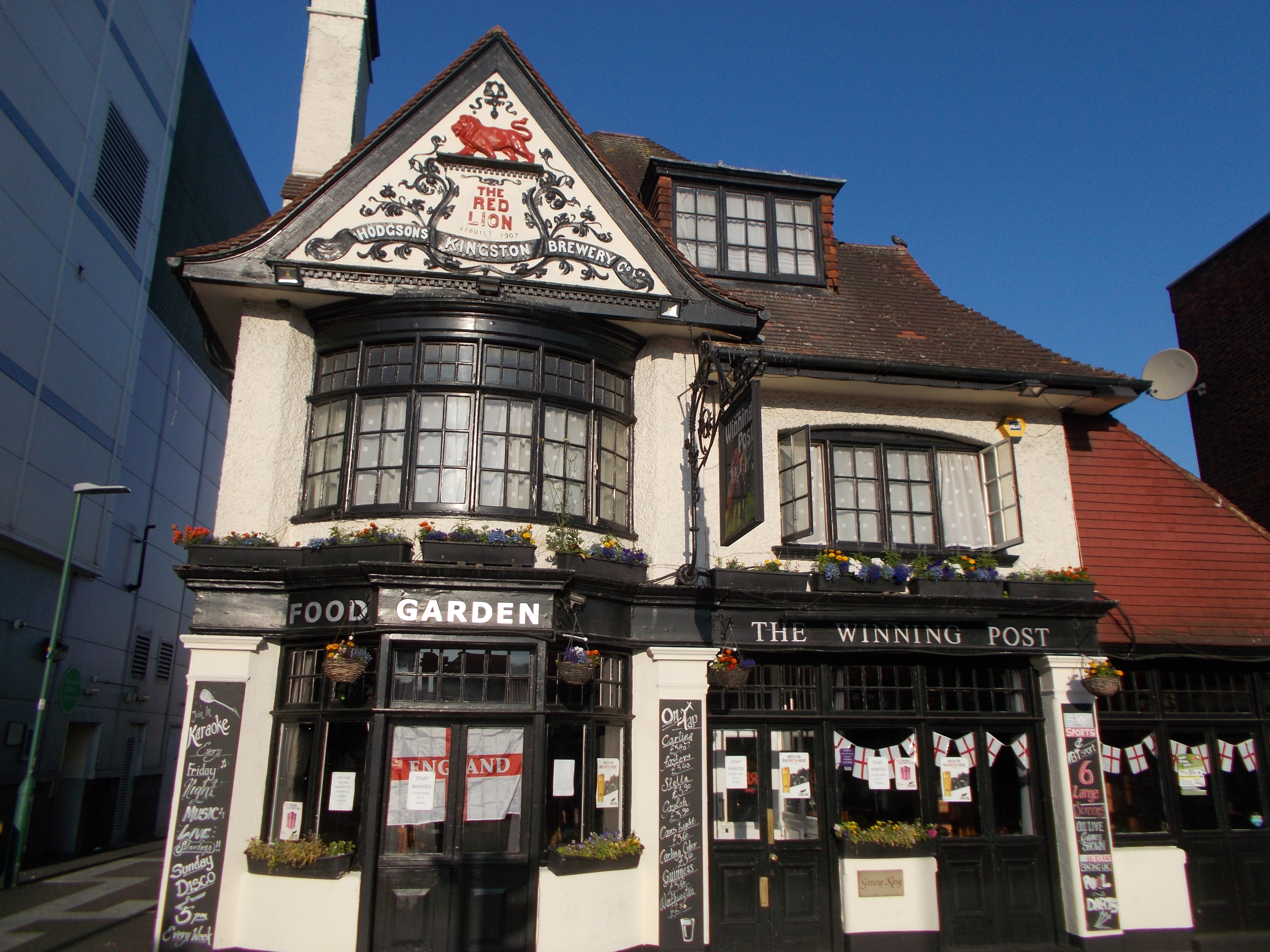
The Red Lion Pub

=== Rolling Stones gigs in High Street pub ===
There is a pub in Sutton High Street called the Winning Post, at the time known as the Red Lion, in which The Rolling Stones played several gigs and where they were spotted in 1963 by Giorgio Gomelsky, a noted music manager, who was in the audience during a historic early gig there. It was also at the Winning Post that, on 23 January 1963, Charlie Watts and Bill Wyman became permanent members of the band.

In 2011, the Winning Post was added to a list of buildings and structures of local significance.

=== Booksellers ===
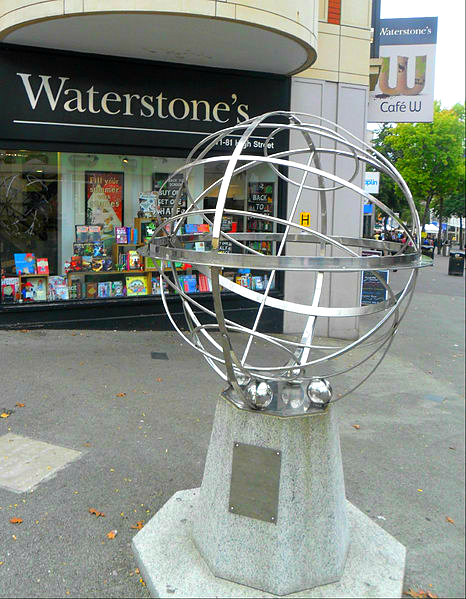
The Sutton armillary with the Waterstones bookshop behind

There are a number of book retailers in the town centre including Waterstones. Its site once was an independent department store when it was built and opened by Ernest Shinner in 1935, and was taken over by Allders in 1979. Allders moved to the then new St Nicholas Centre in 1992. This branch of Waterstones was the first to have a cafe installed.

=== Public Art ===
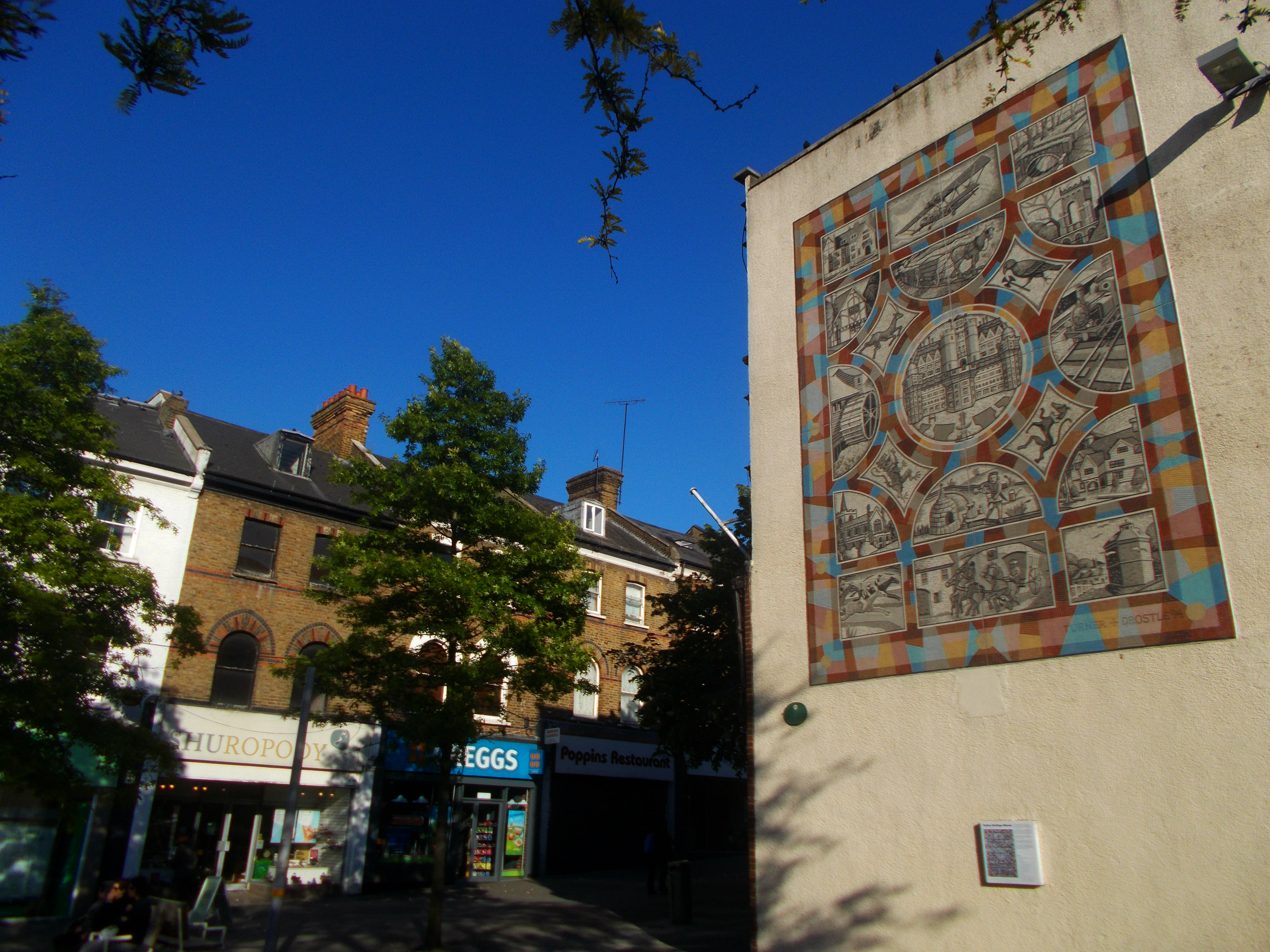
The Sutton Heritage Mosaic

Sutton town centre features six major examples of public art, three of them in the High Street.

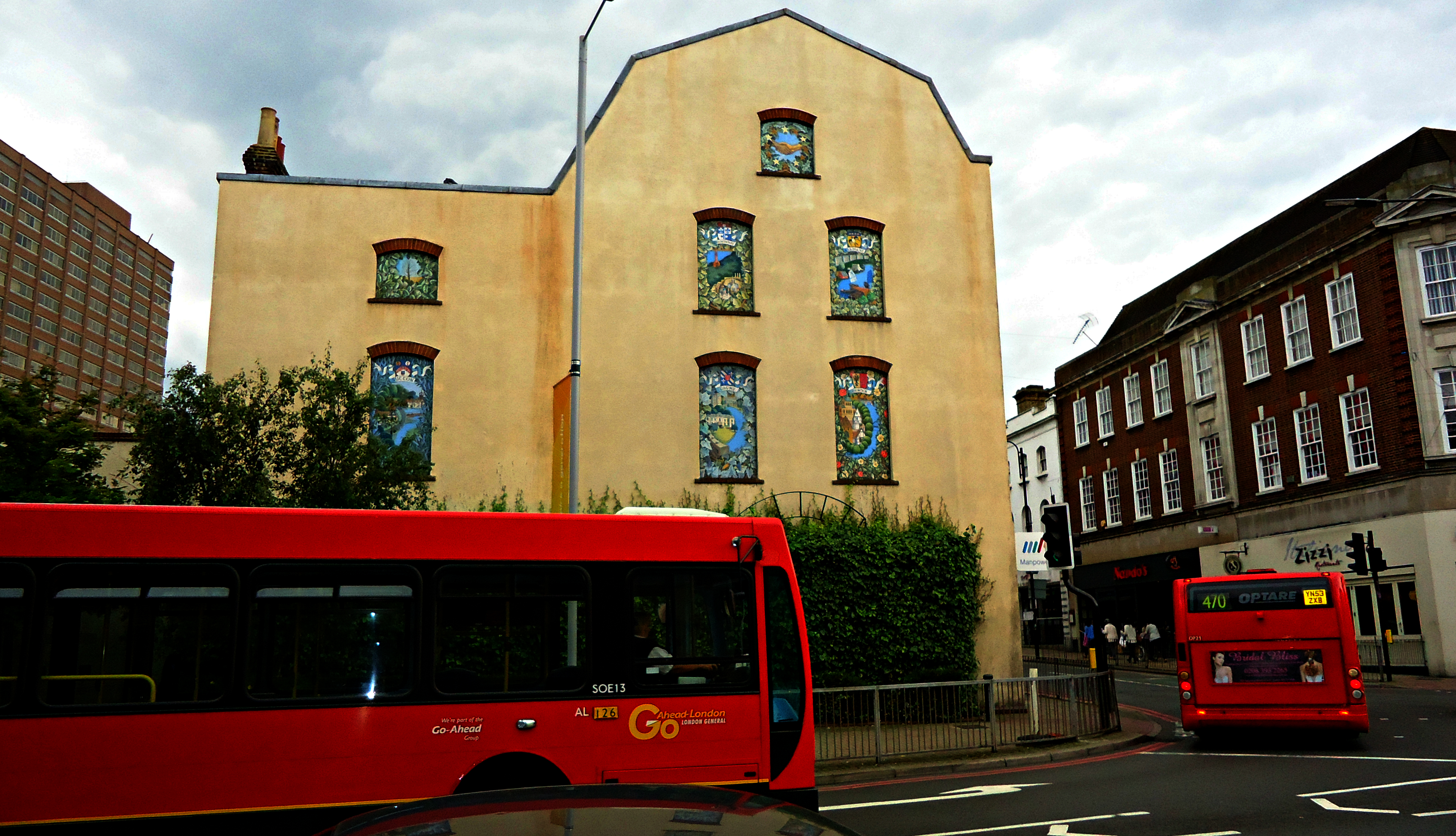
The Sutton twin towns mural

The "Millennium Dial Armillary" was dedicated to the town in the year 2000 by the Rotary Club. The Millennium Dial Armillary is a popular feature of the town and continues to provide an iconic focus for the town centre. It was originally installed in the centre of a small "Millennium Garden", but was slightly re-positioned in 2011, since when it has stood on the edge of the new central square, directly in front of the Waterstones bookshop.

The other examples of public art in the High Street are building-height murals. One consists of a set of seven individual murals on a side wall depicting Sutton's European twin towns. The murals were designed and painted (on to plywood) by professional artists Gary Drostle and Rob Turner and were unveiled in 1993 to commemorate the 25th anniversary of Sutton's twinning with Wilmersdorf.

There is also the Heritage Mosaic measuring 9 metres (30 ft) high and 5 metres (16 ft) wide, and covering the whole of another three storey wall in the town square near the Waterstone's bookshop. Commissioned to celebrate Sutton's heritage, the Drostle and Turner mosaic was made from small tiles made of glass and clay, and put in place in 1994. It was designed by Rob Turner, and shows several aspects of Sutton's heritage and local history. The centre-piece is the depiction of Henry VIII's palace at Nonsuch.

=== Other features of interest ===
As well as public art, there is a Green Wall, designed for aesthetics, to improve air quality and to encourage biodiversity. This "vertical garden" covers the façade of a large High Street store, and is in bloom all year round.

The high street and town square also host street performers, covering live music, arts and theatre. In addition, markets are held from time to time, including French, Italian and Continental markets, as well as arts and crafts fairs. In August and September the high street plays host to the outdoor "Sunset Cinema," where popular films are shown in the evening after the shops have closed to an audience seated in deckchairs. A temporary mini-golf course is set up during August. The High Street has hosted a country music festival with live music and dancing for the last two summers.

In 2013 the Sutton shopper shuttle was introduced as a pilot scheme. The service helps shoppers travel along Sutton High Street. It has proved popular, especially with elderly shoppers, and has since been made permanent. It is the only such service in Greater London. In October 2016 it was nominated for the 2016 National Business Improvement Districts Awards.

Sutton Green lies at the northernmost point of Sutton High Street, to the west of the street. Victoria Gardens also borders the High Street, just to the south of Sutton Green.

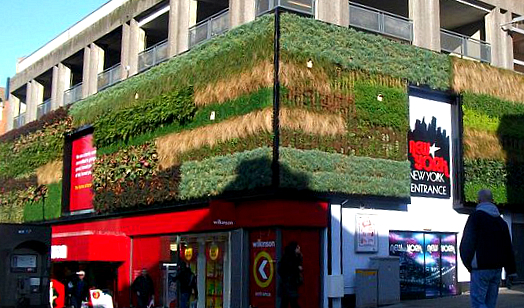
The Green Wall at the southern end of Sutton High Street

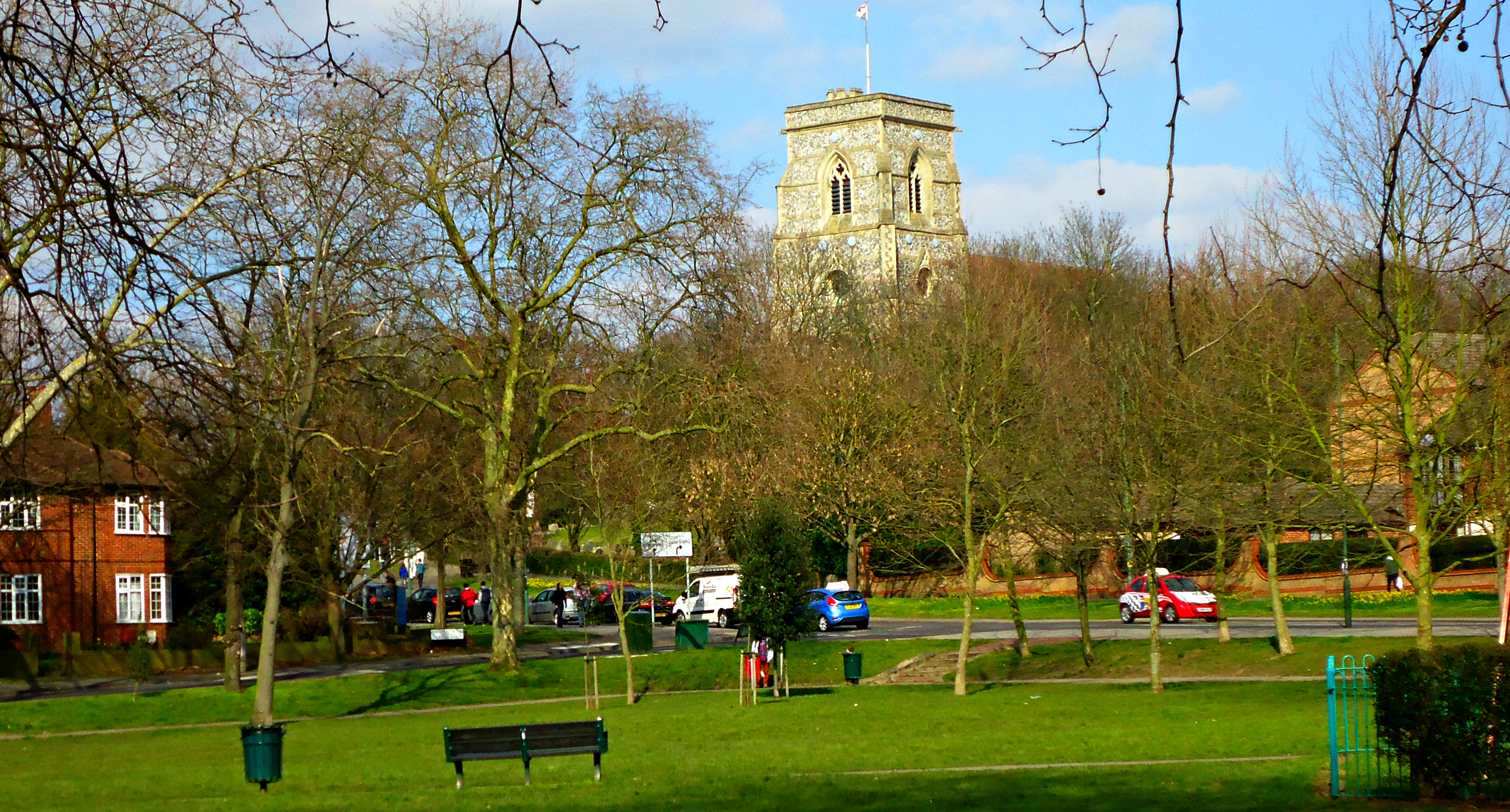
Looking towards the northern end of Sutton High Street from Sutton Green. (All Saints church is in the distance.)

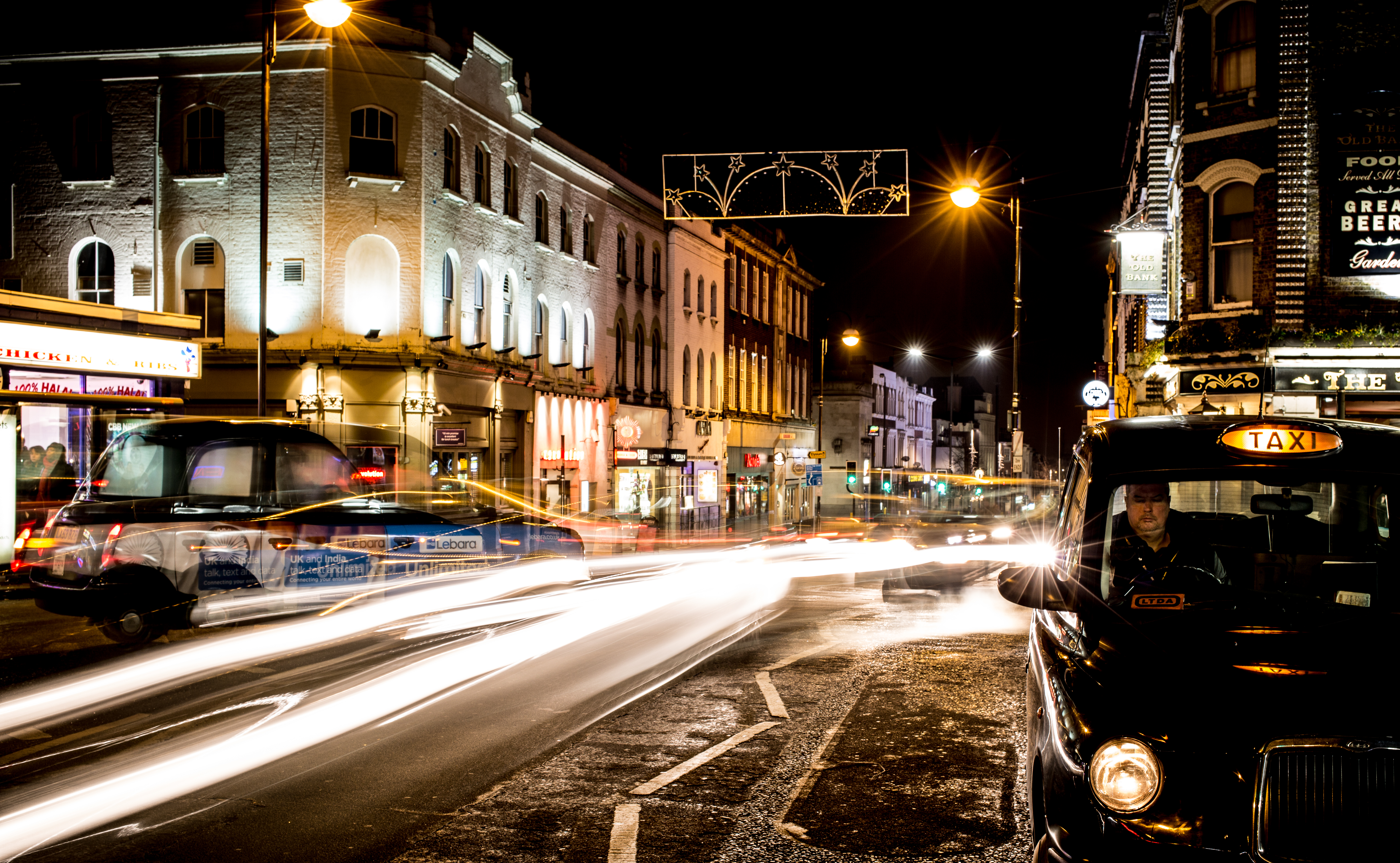
Taxi outside Sutton station at night

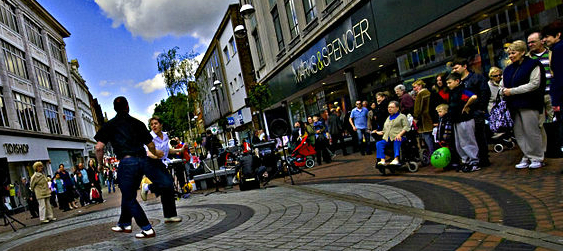
Street performers in Sutton High Street

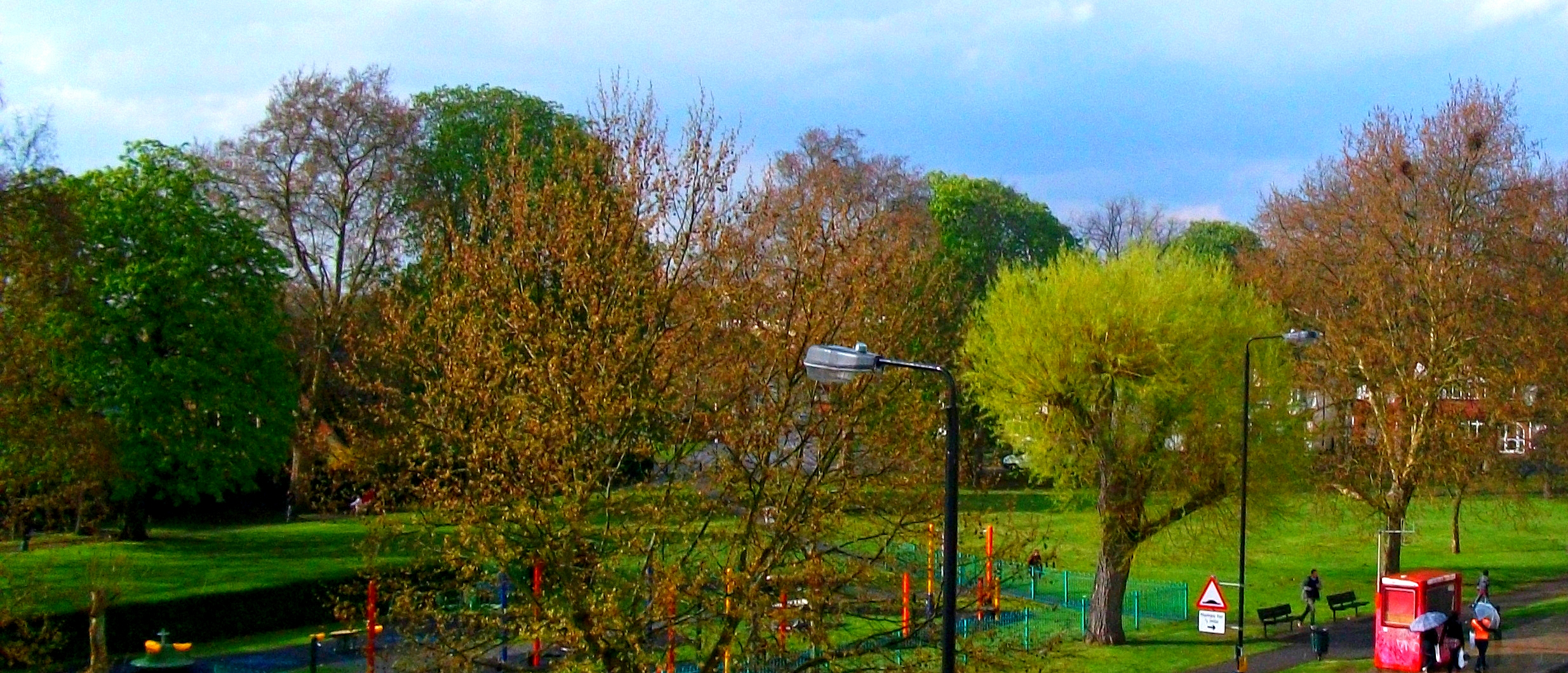
Sutton Green as seen from above

== Regeneration ==
A 2007 retail study found a need for 25% more retail floorspace as well as new mixed use development to accommodate office space, leisure, cultural and residential facilities.

There is co-ordination among the businesses in the town centre in the form of a town centre manager, who works in partnership with local businesses, the police and transport providers to promote the centre and its future development.

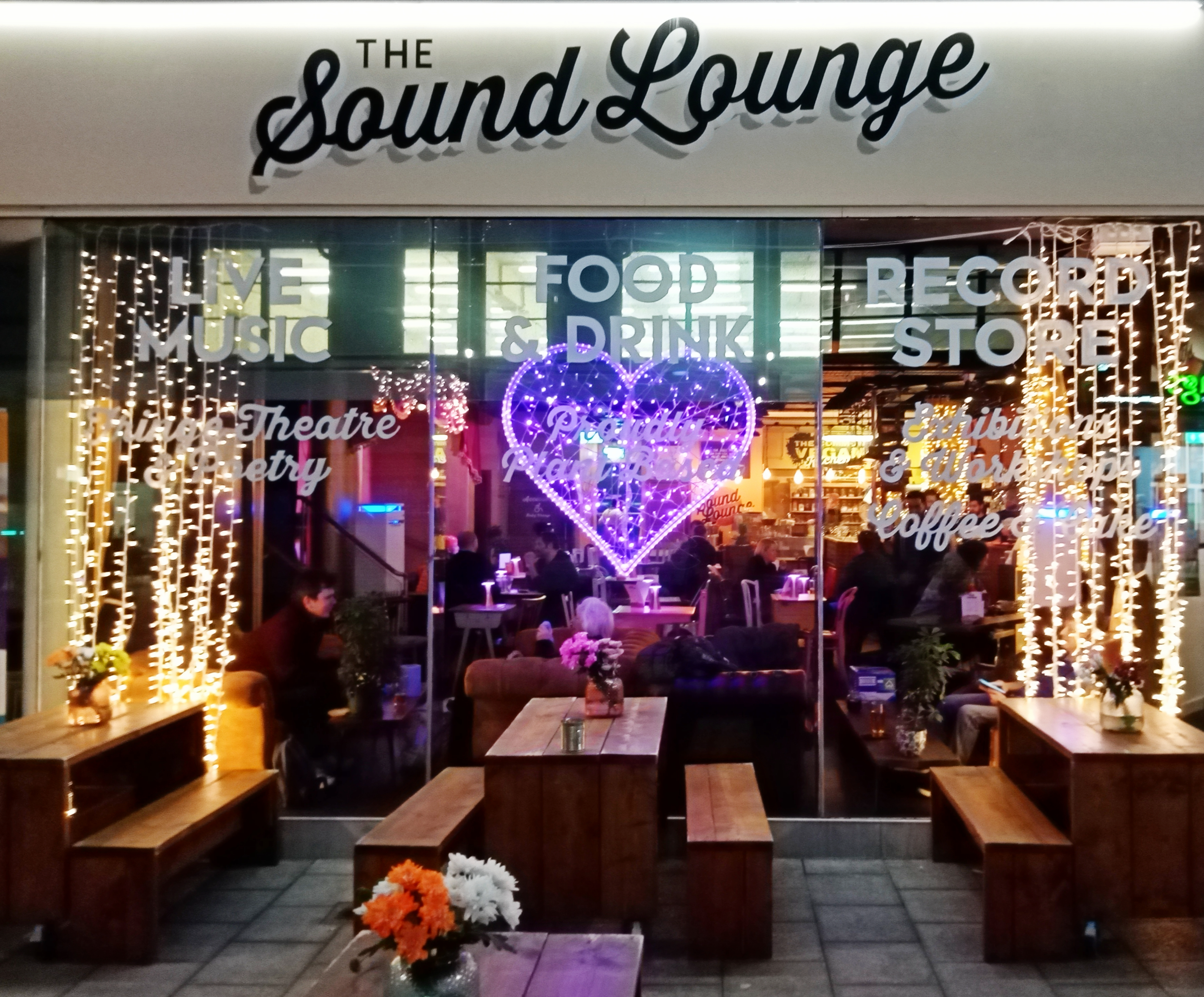
The Sound Lounge, a grassroots music venue, vinyl record shop and vegan restaurant on Sutton High Street

"Opportunity Sutton" and Sutton Chamber of Commerce also play a part in promoting future economic development in the town, which, prior to the current activity set out below, was characterised by developers as "one of London's hidden gems".

=== The Sound Lounge ===
The Sound Lounge, a grassroots music venue, opened in December 2020 in Sutton High Street in the former premises of Royal Bank of Scotland. It hosts live performances of blues, Americana, folk and roots music. The venue includes a plant-based, carbon-neutral /restaurant/café, and also hosts visual art exhibitions, theatre and dance. The site also incorporates a vinyl record shop (one of two branches of the Union Music Store).

In July 2021 the venue became the country's first grassroots music venue to be certified as carbon neutral. A wide variety of measures have been put in place to achieve neutrality. In addition to the fully plant-based menu for the café, these include getting all energy from renewable sources, not sending any waste to landfill and maintaining an allotment garden on site for zero-carbon produce for the café.

=== Sutton Point ===
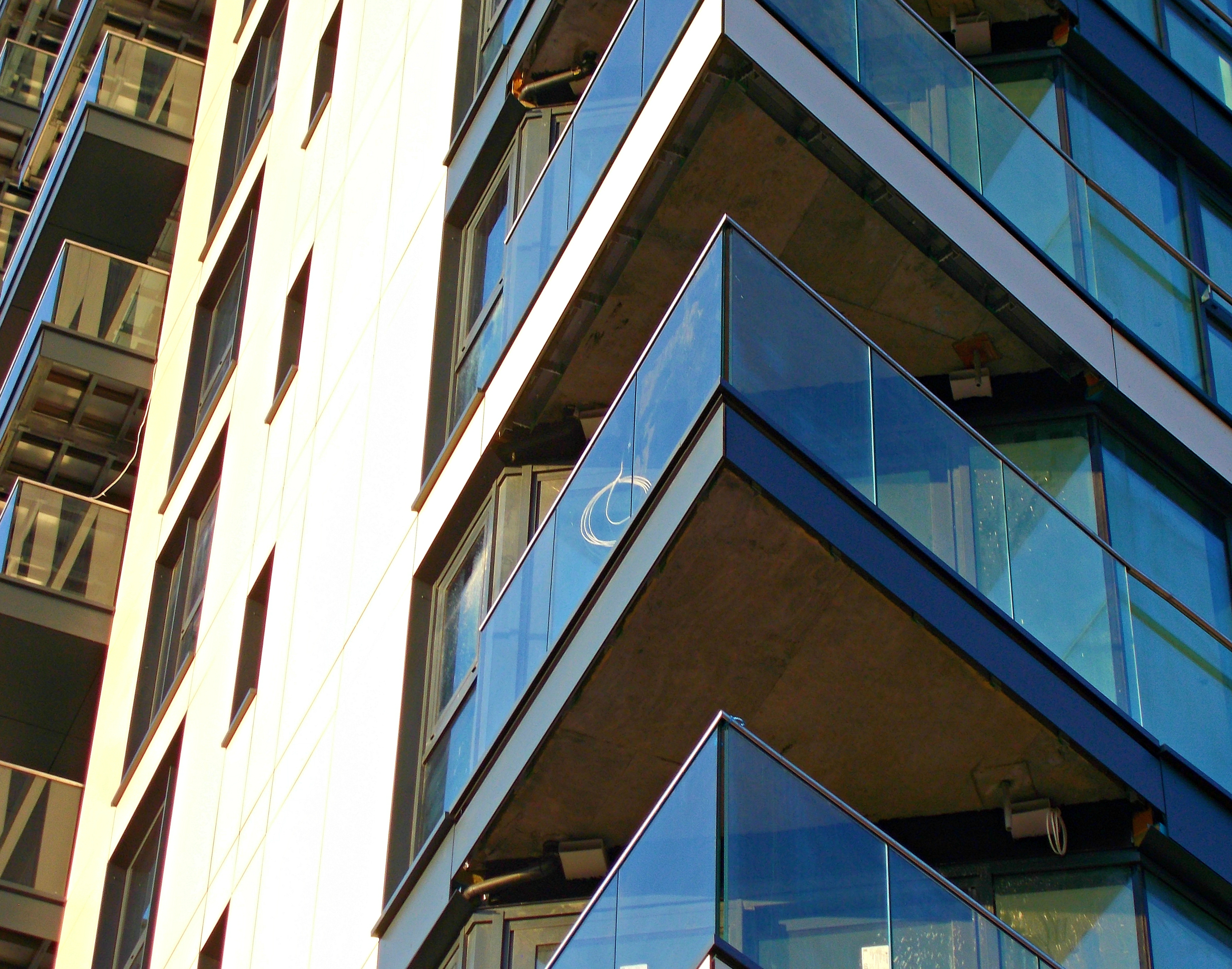
Looking up at balconies of the east tower of Sutton Point, a three tower development completed in early 2018

CNM Estates have redeveloped a site formerly known as South Point at the southern end of the town centre, adjacent to the railway station. The new development, known as "Sutton Point", is for mixed use and includes a hotel, a health club, apartments, shops, restaurants and offices. The scheme will also include a car club to reduce the need for individual car ownership. The scheme was granted planning approval in mid-2013, and work on-site started in Spring 2014.

=== Old Gasworks (Sutton North Central) ===
An initial public consultation took place in mid-2012 on plans by LXB Retail Properties Ltd for a further supermarket, a 123,270 sq ft branch of Sainsbury's, in the town as part of a planned redevelopment of a large (6 acre), mainly disused site bordering the northern end of the High Street, which would also include homes, retail units, and a new public square, public art and a water feature. Work on site commenced in Spring 2014 for the biggest single regeneration of the town centre in a generation. The project was completed in late 2016.

== Transport ==
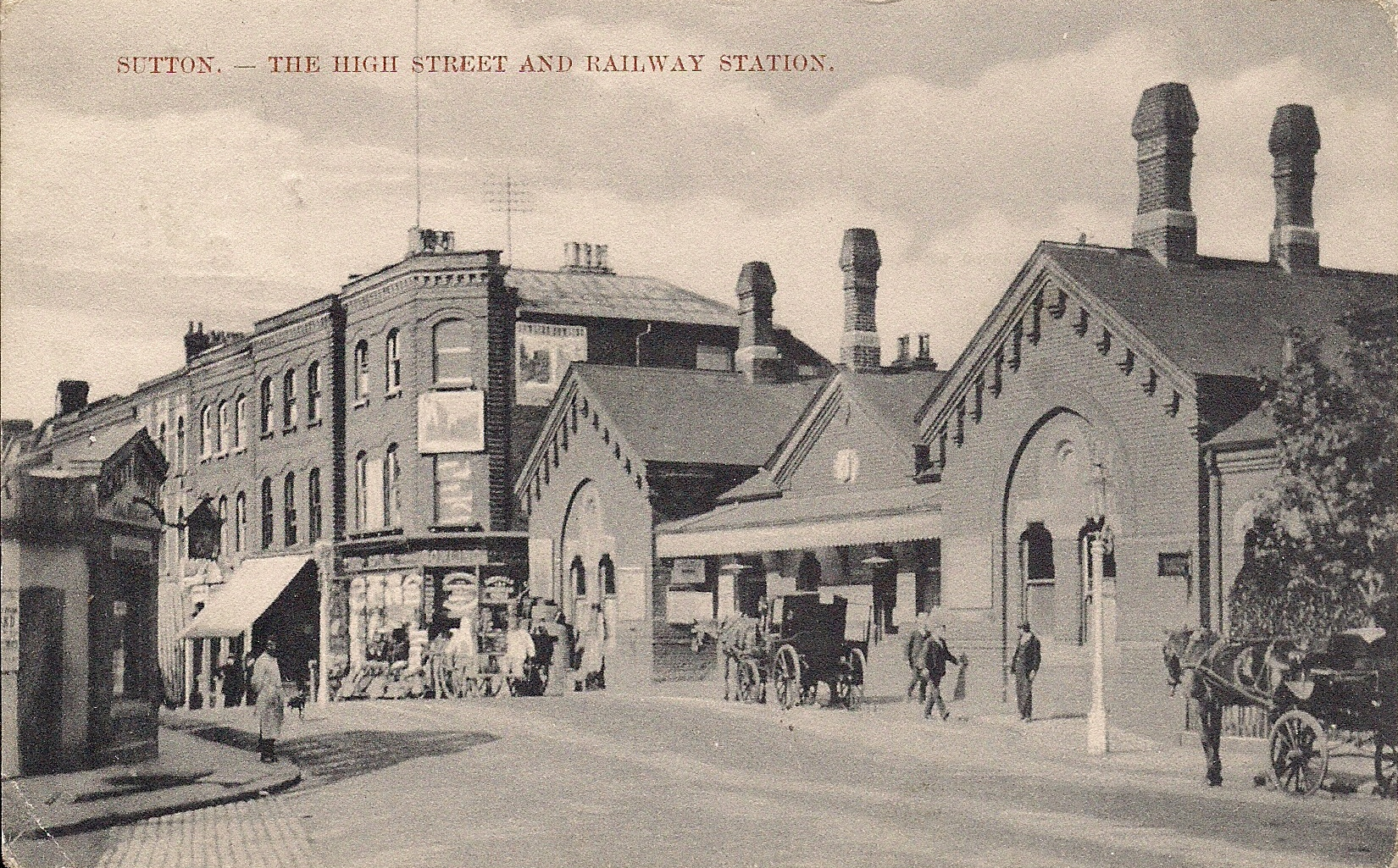
The former Sutton station ca. 1905

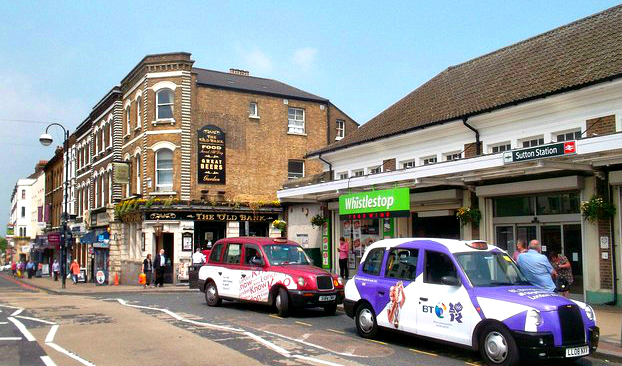
Taxis by Sutton station in 2012

The London to Brighton stagecoach began in 1760. The Cock Hotel in what is now Sutton High Street was the 9 a.m. breakfast stop for coaches leaving the city two hours earlier. The railway arrived in 1847. Sutton railway station is at the southern end of the High Street and Sutton Common railway station just west of the Angel Hill footbridge. The fastest services from the former to London Victoria take 24 minutes.

There is a one-way system around the High Street and two main public car parks – Gibson Road and Times Square – with a third serving the St. Nicholas Centre. The street is served by many buses, most of which are operated for Transport for London. There are also express coach services to both London Heathrow and London Gatwick airports.

As of mid-2014, a consultation was taking place into options for the route of a proposed Sutton Link Tramlink extension from Wimbledon to Sutton, with one option being to run the line down Sutton High Street.
