= Sutton armillary =

Public artwork in Sutton, Greater London

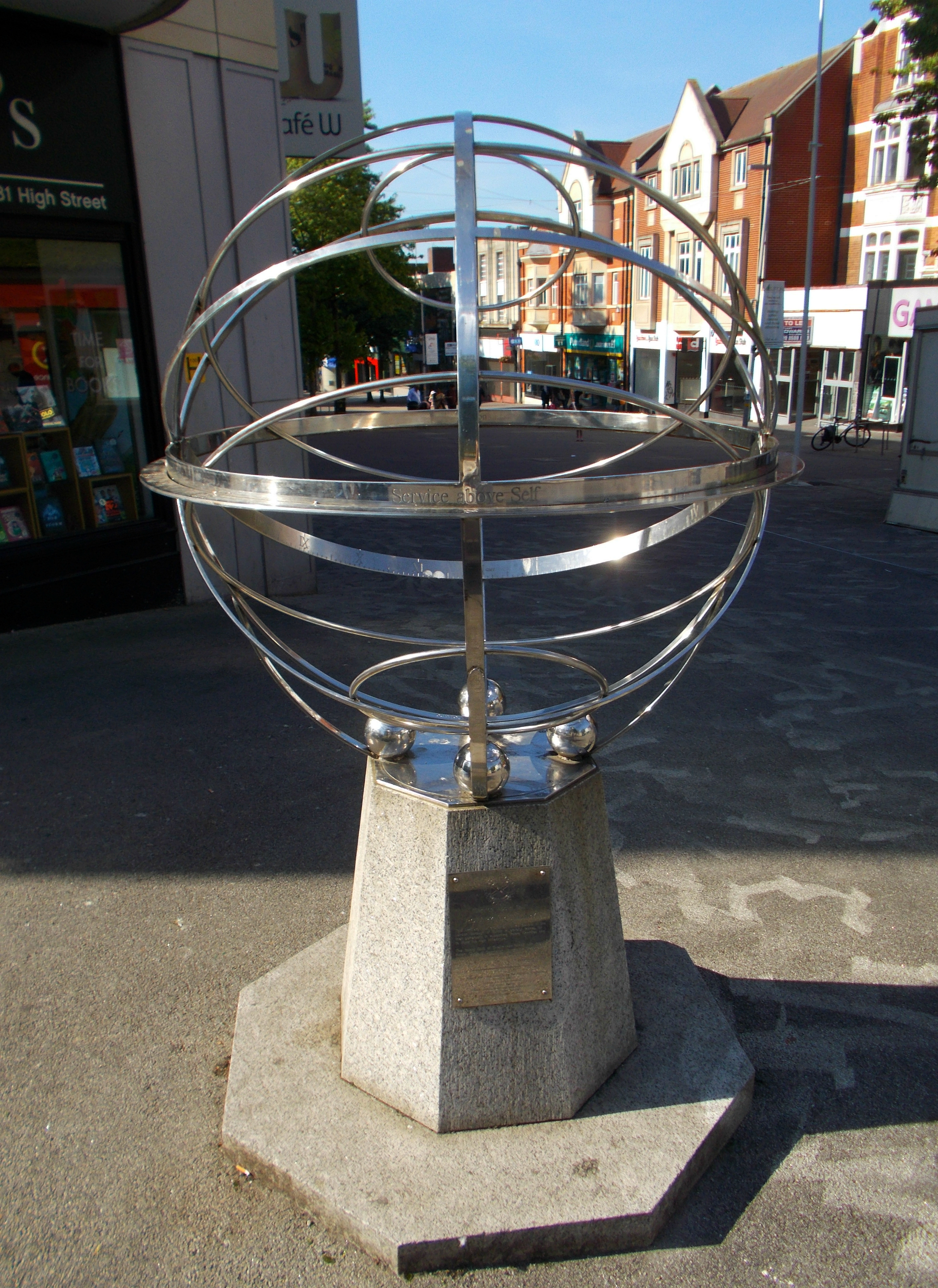
- The Millennium Dial armillary in its latest location outside the town's Waterstones bookshop
- Year: 2000
- Subject: Armillary
- Location: Sutton; 51°21′43″N 0°11′34″W

The Millennium Dial Armillary is one of six pieces of public art located in the town centre of Sutton in Greater London, England. The others include the Sutton heritage mosaic, the Sutton twin towns mural and the Messenger statue.

The armillary was dedicated to the town in 2000 by the Rotary Club, and is in the form of a historical timepiece. It serves three purposes: firstly, simply to tell the time; secondly, to commemorate time through various inscriptions including the Rotary motto "Service Above Self" and distances to nearby areas such as Kingston upon Thames; and thirdly, to commemorate the work which the Rotary Club has done.

== Inscription ==
The inscription on the plinth reads as follows:

"Service Above Self"

Rotary Armillary

This Armillary was presented to the people of the London Borough of Sutton in grateful thanks for their generosity in supporting Rotary Charities and to mark the new Millennium. The Rotary Club of Cheam has joined with the Rotary Clubs of Carshalton, Carshalton Beeches, Sutton, Sutton Nonsuch and Wallington. December 2000

The Project was made possible by the following Sponsors: Securicor plc. Holiday Inn Sutton London. The Crown Agents. South Sutton Neighbourhood Association. Sutton & Cheam Society.

The London Borough of Sutton.

== History ==
The brief history of the Sutton armillary is that, in the years leading up to the new millennium, the London Borough of Sutton expressed its wish for time-related millennium projects. The Rotary Club responded to this by conceiving, planning and jointly funding the armillary. It was designed to last for years to come, and was originally positioned as the central feature of a Millennium Garden. It was slightly re-positioned in 2011, following a repaving of the pedestrianised High Street area, since when it has stood on the edge of the new central square in the town, directly in front of the Waterstones bookshop. When deciding on the new position, the Rotary Club and the local council had to take account of the need for an adequate supply of sunlight.

The armillary also had to be removed temporarily in November 2012, when it came off its plinth – this received coverage in the local press in a column headed "Time stops in Sutton High Street after Armillary removed".

== Benefits to town ==
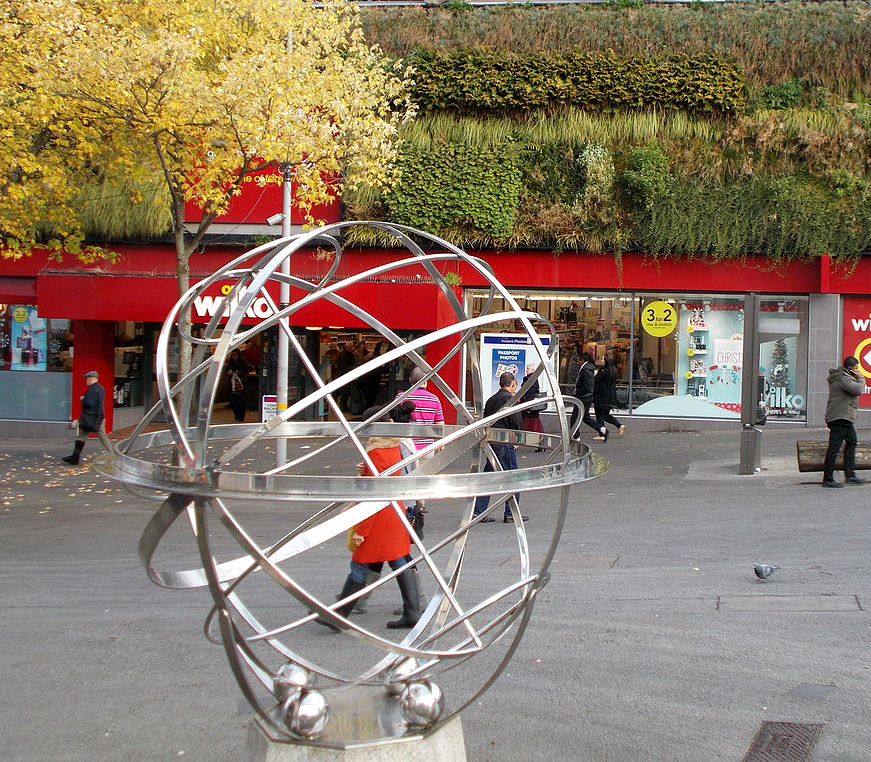
The armillary with the Sutton Green Wall in the background

The armillary's installation has provided a focus for the town centre, and it will remain as a permanent memorial, marking both the new millennium and the important role the Rotary has played in the welfare of Sutton since 1923.
