= The Messenger (David Wynne sculpture) =

1981 statue by David Wynne

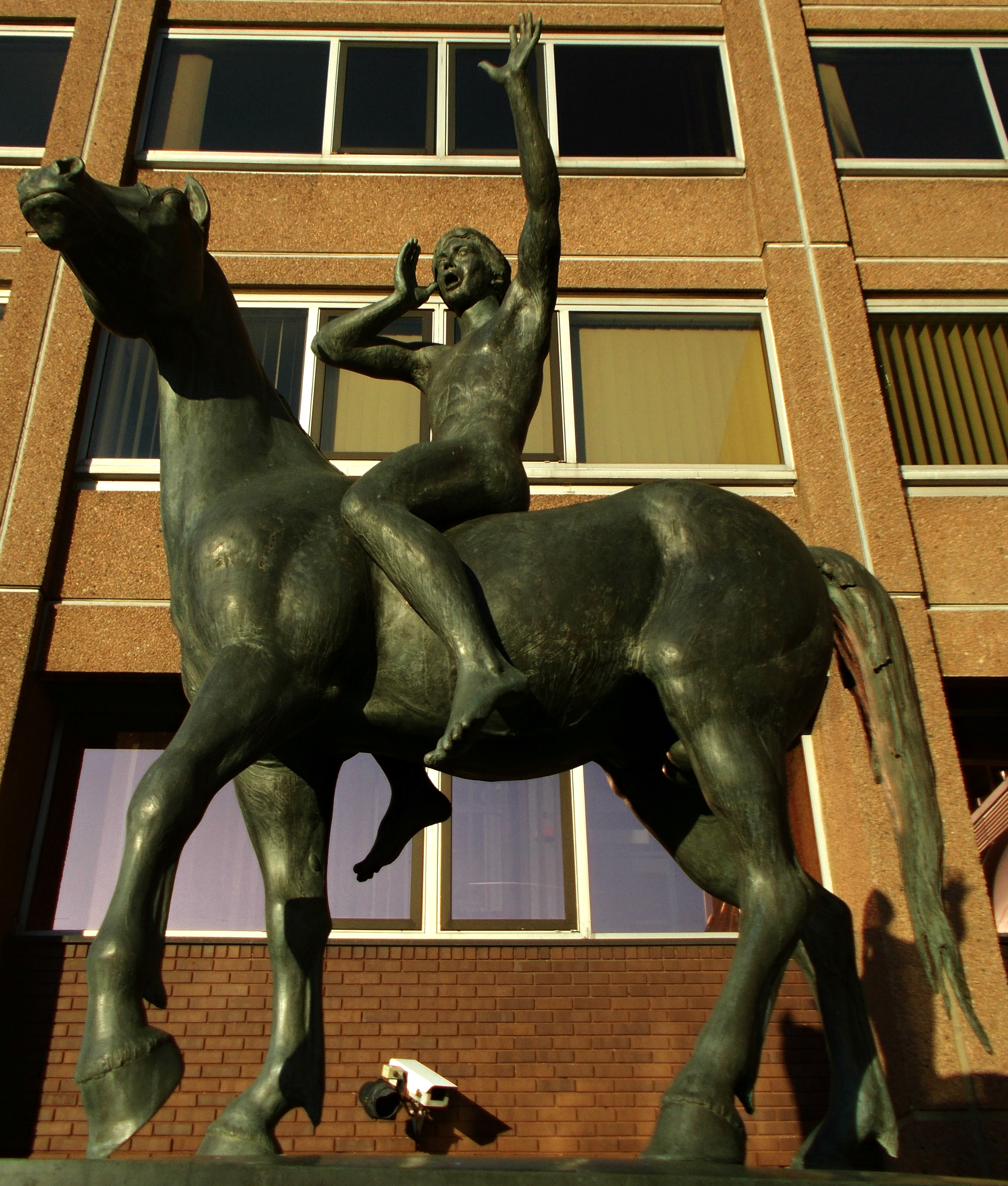
- Year: 1981
- Subject: statue
- Location: Sutton, Greater London; 51°21′34″N 0°11′26″W

The Messenger is a statue by the English sculptor David Wynne, OBE of a horse and rider. It was installed in the town centre of Sutton in Greater London, England in 1981.

== Appearance ==
The statue features a horse and nude young male rider, created in bronze with very dark patination. It is located directly outside the main entrance to Quadrant House (in the Quadrant), adjacent to Sutton railway station. The horse, with a slightly raised left leg, looks towards the station. The boy-rider, seated bareback, raises his left hand in the air above his head and his right hand to his mouth, as if calling out. It is fully life-size and mounted on a 7-foot plinth of marble and granite slabs. The total height is 150 inches.

== Development ==
The statue was commissioned by the then Business Press International Ltd, and upkeep of the work now falls to Reed Business Information, who occupy Quadrant House. It was a major commission for Wynne, which took four years from his first idea and inspiration on receipt of the brief through roughing out, refining and foundry to the final unveiling and installation. The brief given to him by the company was to illustrate the fundamental business of the company, namely communication, but to convey the idea, rather than simply to represent the work of the company in a direct or very obvious way.

Wynne had to consider what actual form the sculpture would take to best capture the idea of communication. When inspiration came to him, it did so "like a flash of light, complete", as he put it:

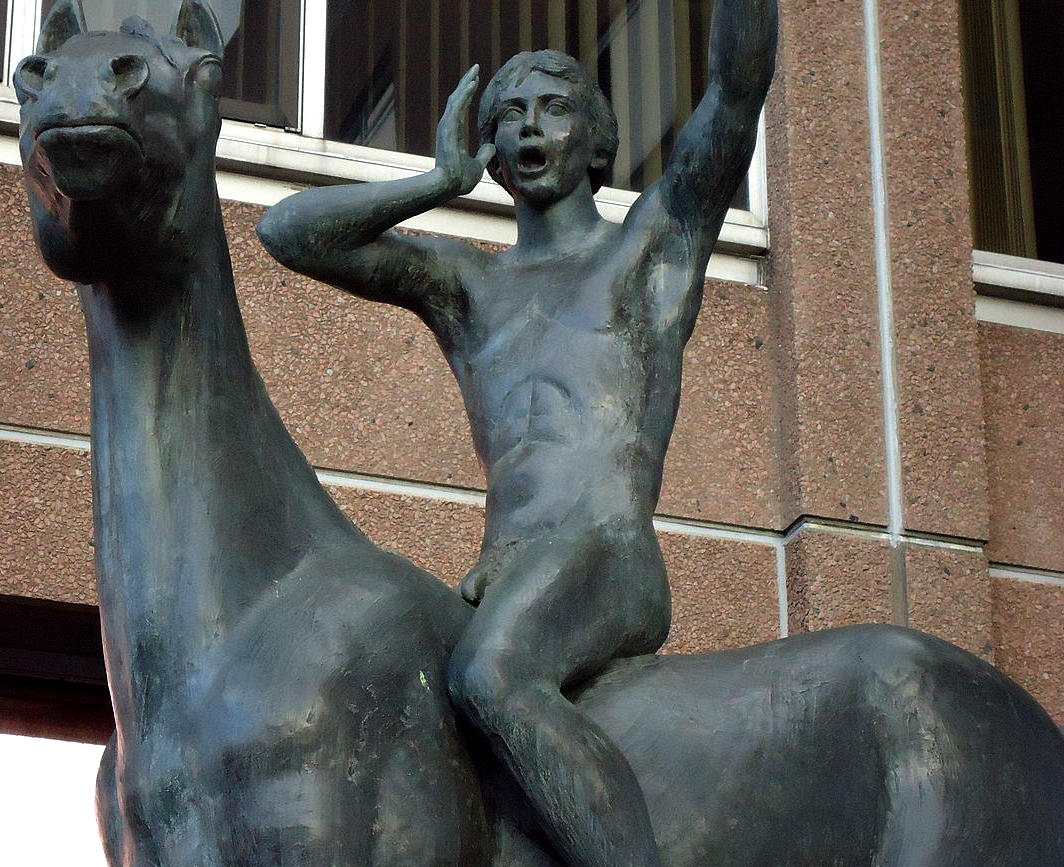
View of the statue showing the rider calling out

A tall wise horse that had never known a bridle, a magic horse if you like, poised, one foot pointing to the centre of the earth; head up, nostrils flared, about to whip round and plunge away. On his back a carefree boy, wild as the horse, calling out to his friends, who have forgotten that they too are heirs to his kingdom.

As part of his preparation, Wynne visited Italy to see the Equestrian Statue of Marcus Aurelius in Rome and the Horses of Saint Mark in Venice.

In his introductory essay in the book The Messenger, Lucius Noël notes Wynne's dislike for statues where the horse is shown as merely the support for the rider. Noël notes the way that Wynne highlights the interrelationship between horse and rider in the work, as he did in his previous two horse and rider sculptures. While noting the greater reality in the work than its two equestrian predecessors, he stresses the strong symbolism in the work. He writes:

The rider, a young man, is giving his message to his audience, and seems to be saying that there is another world that all should know about. But the horse is just as important as the man. His is, in fact, more conscious than the man, and has his feet firmly planted on the ground, one hoof pointing to the centre of the earth. They are a team, and the overall impression is that each needs the other: man needs the horse, as much as the horse needs man.

Noël notes how this analysis ties in with Wynne's wider views about animals, saying "We must share the Earth with the animals, who have as much right to it as we do. To find a way to live in peace with the animals is our duty.".

== Location ==
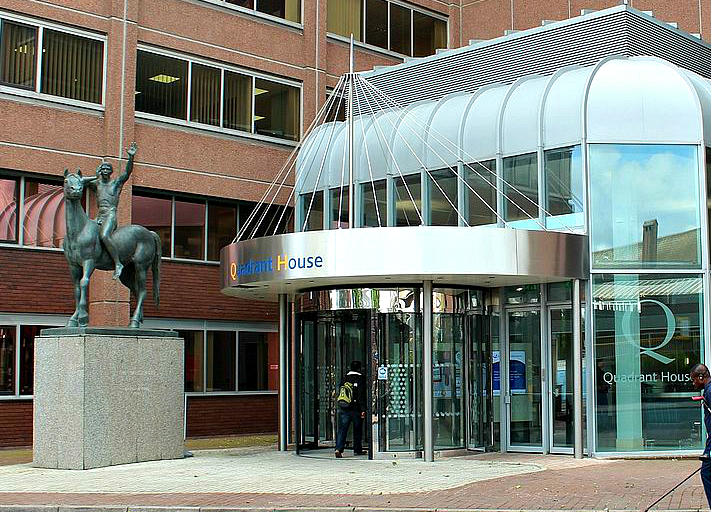
The statue in situ

The company had initially considered that the work should be installed high up, above the entrance lobby. However, Wynne advised against this, feeling that the distance created would militate against the engagement he wanted people to have with the work. It would be perceived as two-dimensional, depriving people of the full three-dimensions they would feel by walking around it. So the statue was installed at ground level in front of the entrance to the building, enabling people to get close up to it.

Describing his thoughts moments before the unveiling, David Wynne wrote in his 1982 book The Messenger:

It is a proud moment for the sculptor when he sees a crowd of expectant and rather puzzled people gazing at an ungainly shrouded shape in the most prominent position outside a gleaming new building. Will they be surprised, pleased, disappointed or even appalled when the cover comes off? Too late to change it now!

== See also ==
- Sutton twin towns mural
- Sutton armillary
- Sutton Heritage Mosaic
