= Great Bookham =

Village in Surrey, England

Coordinates: 51°16′41″N 0°22′23″W

- Village
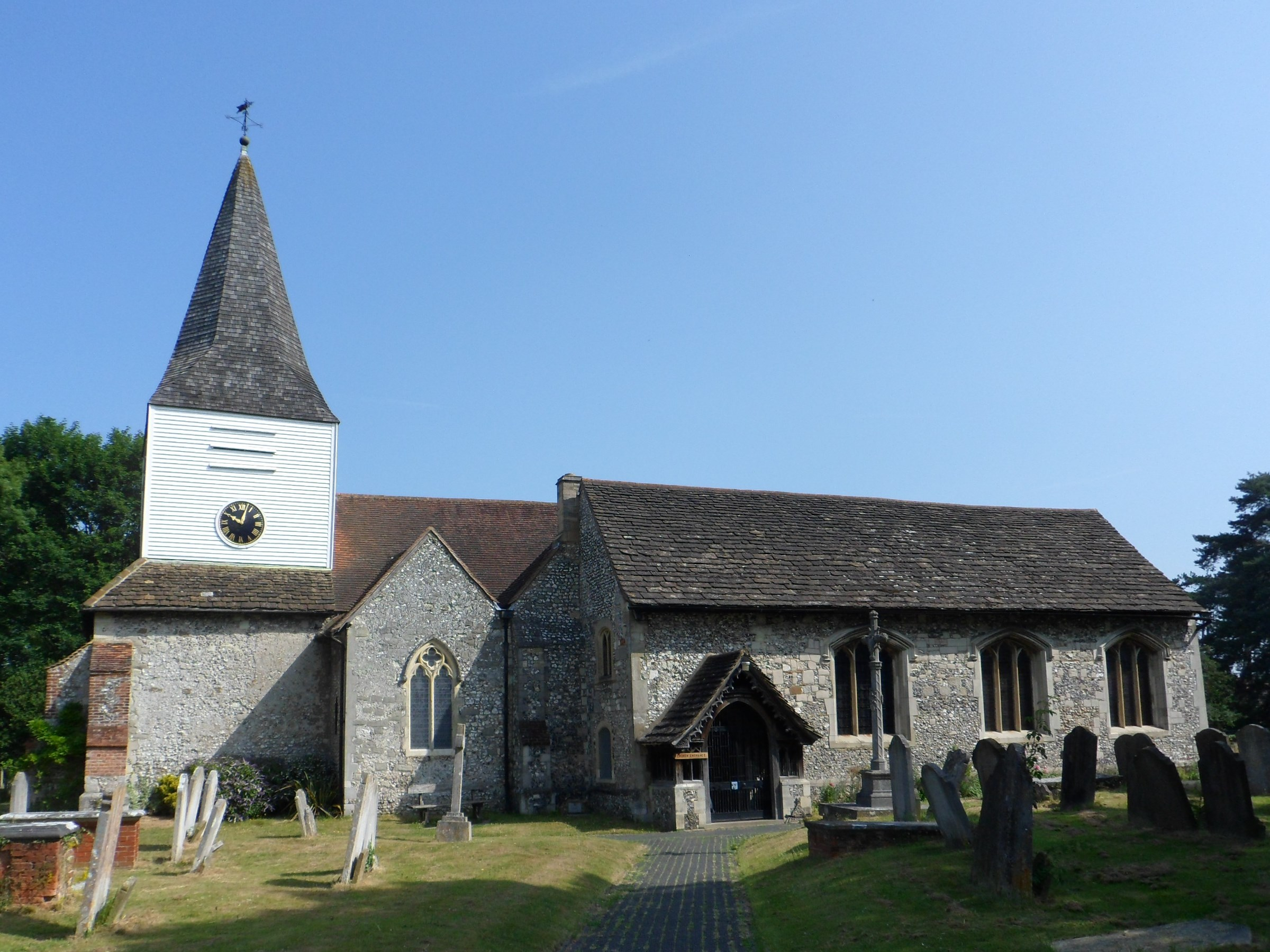
- St Nicolas Church

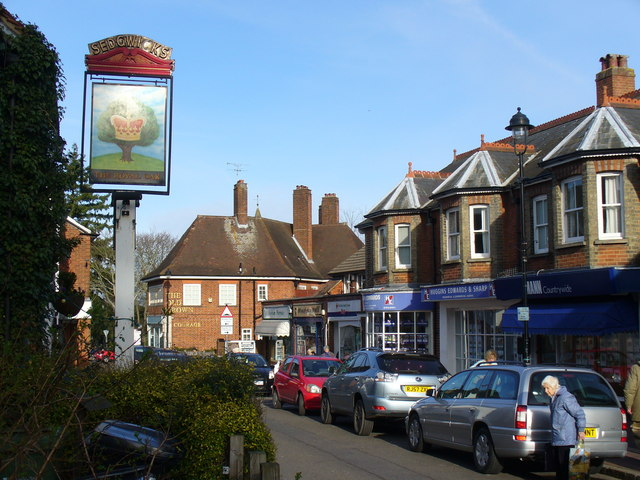
- High Street

- Location within Surrey
- Population: 11,375 (2011 Census. Bookham North and South Wards, covering Great and Little Bookham)
- OS grid reference: TQ1354
- District: Mole Valley
- Shire county: Surrey
- Region: South East
- Country: England
- Sovereign state: United Kingdom
- Post town: Leatherhead
- Postcode district: KT23
- Dialling code: 01372
- Police: Surrey
- Fire: Surrey
- Ambulance: South East Coast
- UK Parliament: Dorking and Horley

Great Bookham is a village in the Mole Valley district, in Surrey, England, one of six semi-urban spring line settlements between the towns of Leatherhead and Guildford. With the narrow strip parish of Little Bookham, it forms part of the Saxon settlement of Bocham ("the village by the beeches"). The Bookhams are surrounded by common land, and Bookham railway station in Church Road, Great Bookham, serves both settlements.

The villages are astride the A246, which is the direct route between the two towns. Once two distinct villages, the Bookhams have since the early 20th century been interconnected with streets lined with houses with gardens which give the impression of, as was the case before some point before the Norman Conquest one large, albeit more populated village.

On the southern edge of the village is Polesden Lacey, a country house surrounded by more than 1,000 acres (4.0 km^{2}) of grounds. It is owned by the National Trust and open to the public.

== History ==
Great Bookham coloured pink, map of 1884.

According to a charter of c. 675, the original of which is lost but which exists in a later form, there were granted to Chertsey Abbey twenty dwellings at Bocham cum Effingham. This was confirmed by four Saxon kings; King Offa of Mercia and of the nations roundabout in 787; King Æthelstan who was "King and ruler of the whole island of Britain" in 933 confirmed the privileges to the monastery; King Edgar, "Emperor of all Britain" in 967 confirmed "twelve mansiones" in Bocham, and King Edward the Confessor, King of the English, in 1062 confirmed twenty mansae at Bocham cum Effingham, Driteham and Pechingeorde.

Great Bookham lay within the Anglo-Saxon administrative district of Effingham half hundred and Surrey as a county (shire in pre-Norman terms), in which it remains.

The Domesday Book of 1086, which was a survey for taxation purposes, makes the first known distinction between the parishes of Great and Little Bookham, if it is assumed that there was no separate parish at the time of the charter of Edward the Confessor in 1062. Driteham and Pechingeorde are both referred to in the Domesday Book and appear to have been absorbed into the manors of Effingham and Effingham East Court. Great Bookham appears in the Domesday Book in the ancient hundred of Effingham as Bocheham. It was held by St Peter's Abbey, Chertsey. Its Domesday Assets were: 13 hides; 1 church, 1 mill worth 10s, 20 ploughs, 6 acres (2.4 ha) of meadow, woodland and herbage worth 110 hogs. It rendered (in total): £15.

It seems probable, as the number of cottages in Bookham and Effingham remained constant, that the later charters must have been copies of earlier charters which were not revised to accord with the actual number of cottages at any one time.

In 1951 the civil parish had a population of 7885. On 1 April 1974 the parish was abolished.

== Polesden Lacey ==
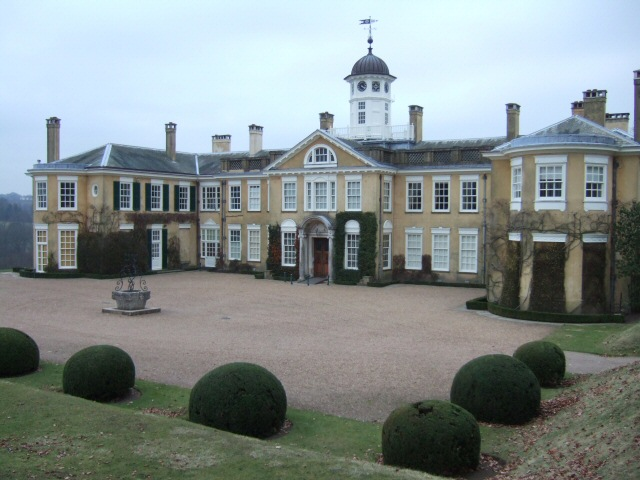
Polesden Lacey

A regency villa on the southern edge of the village, Polesden Lacey has been the site of a house since at least 1336. The current house dates from the 17th century, and was bequeathed by its last owner, the Hon. Mrs. Greville, a legendary Edwardian hostess, to the National Trust in 1942. When the Grevilles purchased the property in 1906, they extensively remodelled the house with the help of Mewes and Davis, architects of the Ritz Hotel, London. There are large walled and formal gardens, an orchard and croquet lawn, as well as extensive farmland.

The property and its 1,400-acre (5.7 km^{2}) estate are open to the public, and is one of the National Trust's most visited properties. The house is also the National Trust's Southern Region head office.

The future King George VI and his bride spent part of their honeymoon at Polesden Lacey, as guests of Mrs. Greville.

The poet and playwright Richard Brinsley Sheridan was a previous owner of the property from 1804.

== Bookham Grove ==
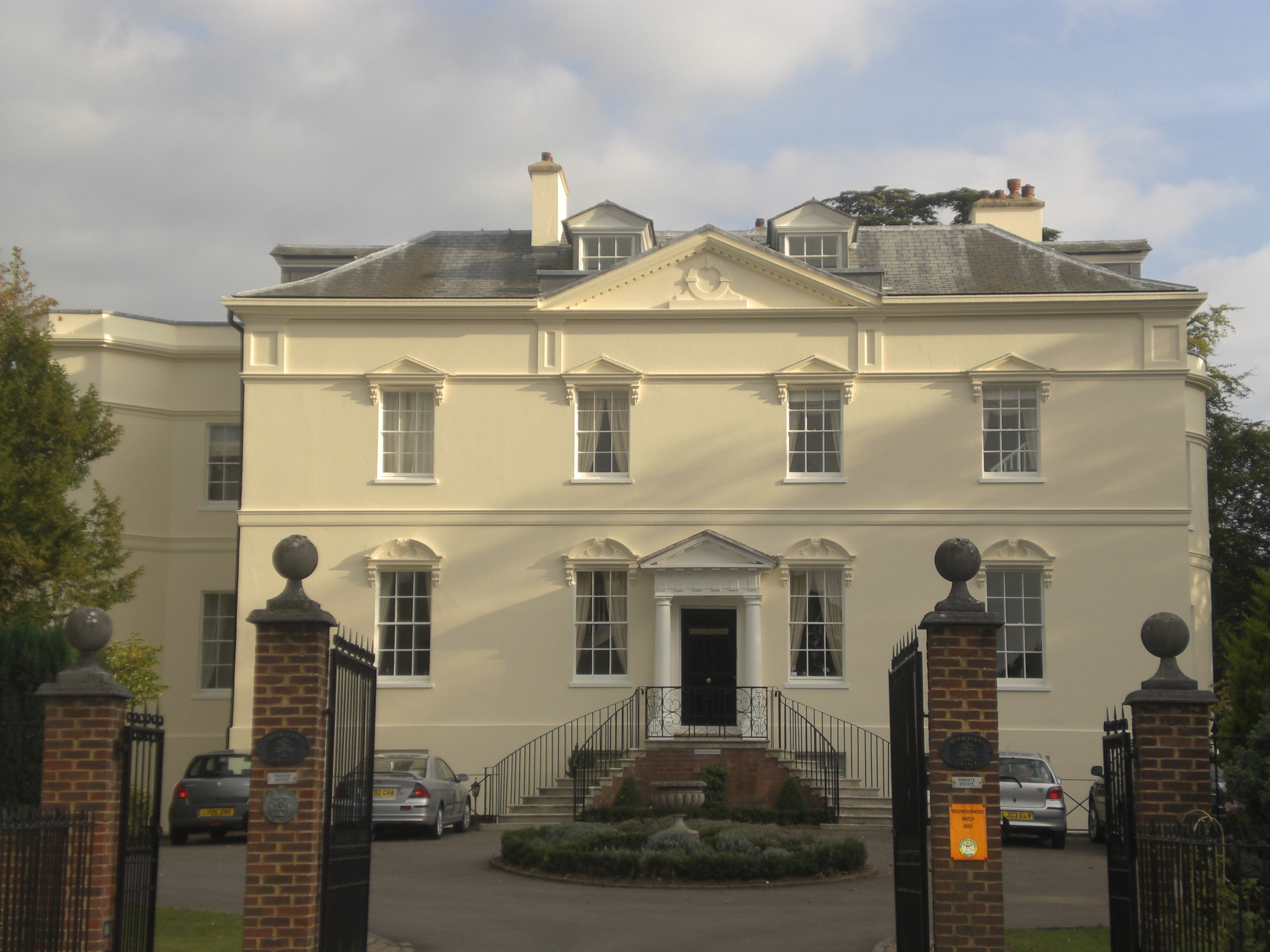
Bookham Grove House

To the south side of the High Street stands Bookham Grove Manor, built in the early 18th century, once owned by the Dawnay family. It is now converted into apartments, with coach houses built in its now one-acre (0.40 ha) grounds. The manor's original large estate covered the surrounding roads up to Dorking Road, and Groveside, and had grounds to the front, running down to the Guildford Road. When the land was sold for development in 1947, the shops and car park were built in the grounds to the front of the house. Another surviving part of the estate is the stables, on the corner of Dorking Road.

== Eastwick Park ==
Eastwick Park 1904

Eastwick Park, a beautiful manor in the village, was lost in 1958. The house stood within the area of roads now known as the 'Eastwick area', and its very large private estate included Great Bookham Commons, which were saved by the village and given to the National Trust. After ceasing to be used as a private house, the manor was used by the Canadian military in World War II, and was also a school called Southey Hall, before being demolished for redevelopment. The original gates to the house stand just west of Eastwick Park Avenue on Lower Road.

== Geography ==
To the west of the Bookhams lies the village of Effingham; further west on the road to Guildford lie the similar villages of East and West Horsley and East and West Clandon. To the north-east lie Fetcham and Leatherhead, north of which the area becomes increasingly urban heading towards central London, which is only 23 miles (37 km) away. To the south-east, across the North Downs, are the village of Westhumble and the market town of Dorking.

== Today ==
The village has a short high street at its centre. There are three public houses in Great Bookham: The Old Crown, The Anchor, The Royal Oak and one in Little Bookham, Ye Olde Windsor Castle. The Old Barn Hall is the main community centre, regularly used for staging amateur dramatics productions and hosting parties and receptions.

There are two primary schools in the village: Eastwick Junior School in Eastwick Drive and Great Bookham School (formerly The Dawnay School) in Griffin Way. There are three infant schools in Great Bookham: Polesden Lacey Infant School in Oakfield Close, Eastwick Infant School in Eastwick Drive, and Great Bookham Infant School in Griffin Way.

== Sport and leisure ==
Great Bookham has a Non-League football club Bookham F.C. who play at the Chrystie Recreation Ground in the Surrey Elite Intermediate Football League. The club was founded before the First World War.

== Bookham Commons ==
Bookham Commons comprises Great Bookham Common bought by local residents in 1923 to save the oak woodlands, then given to the National Trust and Little Bookham Common given to the Trust in 1924 by Mr H. Willock-Pollen, then Banks Common in 1925 by Mr R. Calburn.

The London Natural History Society surveyed Bookham Commons for more than fifty years, making it one of the best recorded sites for wildlife in southeast England.

The common land consists of grassland (wet, low-lying meadows), woodland, scrub and twelve ponds. The ponds are home to all three British species of newt, including the rare Great Crested Newt. The five largest ponds are man-made, formed for fish production in the 17th century.

== Emergency services ==
Great Bookham is served by these emergency services:

- Surrey Police (nearest police counter is at Epsom Town Hall)
- South East Coast Ambulance Service as of 1 July 2006, is the local NHS Ambulance Services Trust. The Surrey, Sussex, and Kent Ambulance services have all merged, and have now ceased to exist.
- Surrey Fire & Rescue Service, Actually in Fetcham, but called Leatherhead Fire Station.
  - 1 x Water tender ladder
  - 1 x Water carrier

== Notable people ==
- Jane Austen, whose godfather and cousin Rev. Samuel Cooke was vicar of Great Bookham (1769-1820), is said to have spent time in Bookham whilst writing several of her novels in the late 18th and early 19th centuries. Its location is consistent with the geographical details in Emma.
- Lilian Elkington, composer and pianist, lived at Ridge House, 11 Groveside, from 1948 to 1954.
- Louis Essen, pioneer of the atomic clock, died in Great Bookham.
- Conor Gallagher, football player, grew up in Great Bookham.
- C. S. Lewis, author, studied privately with William T. Kirkpatrick in Great Bookham between September 1914 and April 1917.
- Roger Waters, Pink Floyd bass player and singer, was born in Great Bookham in 1943.

== See also ==
- List of places of worship in Mole Valley
