= Edward Moon =

English rower and clergyman

Sir Edward Graham Moon, 2nd Baronet (25 March 1825 – 21 February 1904), was an English rower and clergyman.

Moon was the son of Sir Francis Moon, 1st Baronet, and his wife Anne Chancellor. His father was a printseller and publisher and Lord Mayor of London. Moon was educated at Magdalen College, Oxford, where he was a leading oarsman. In 1846 he won the University Sculls and the Diamond Challenge Sculls at Henley Royal Regatta. In 1847 at Henley he lost Diamonds in the final to William Maule. However he was bow in the Oxford crew which won the Grand Challenge Cup at Henley beating Cambridge in a year when there was no Boat Race. Moon's opposite number at bow in the Cambridge boat was William Maule.

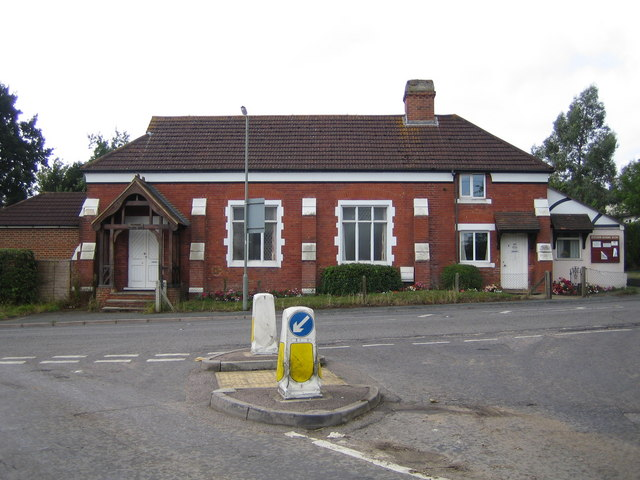
Fetcham Reading Room

Moon was ordained deacon in 1849 and priest in 1851 and was curate of St. John's, Worcester and of Bredon, Worcestershire. His father-in-law, Alderman Thomas Sidney, had acquired the advowson of St. Mary's Church, Fetcham, Surrey, and was able to present Moon to the living when it fell vacant in 1854. At Fetcham, Moon was prominent in supporting local and national charities. He arranged the opening of the Fetcham village school in 1854 and was a major subscriber to the establishment of the reading room. He also built one of the three almshouses, but his main achievement was the substantial improvement of the church. He inherited the baronetcy in 1871 on the death of his father, who was commemorated in much of the restoration work in the church.

Moon died at Fetcham at the age of 78 and was buried in the churchyard. There is a memorial east window.

Moon married Ellen Sidney, only daughter of Thomas Sidney in the West Ham district in 1851. He was succeeded in the baronetcy by his son Francis Sidney Graham Moon.

Through his mother's lineage, Moon was related to the architects Frederic Chancellor and F. G. M. Chancellor.

Baronetage of the United Kingdom
Preceded by Francis Graham Moon	Baronet (of Portman Square); 1871–1904	Succeeded by Francis Graham-Moon
