= Wanksy =

Graffiti artist in Manchester, England

- Born: United Kingdom
- Style: Graffiti

Wanksy is a pseudonymous graffiti artist based in Manchester, England. In 2015, he gained notoriety for drawing phalluses around potholes in Ramsbottom and Bury, Greater Manchester. The name Wanksy is a portmanteau of wank and Banksy.

== Career ==
Wanksy is a university qualified artist and construction worker. Frustrated by the poor state of roads in Greater Manchester, which Wanksy claimed had hospitalised cyclists and damaged vehicles, Wanksy began drawing phalluses around potholes in April 2015 and posting the images on social media in order to draw attention to the issue. Wanksy claimed his methods were highly effective at getting the potholes fixed, noting the years-old potholes were fixed within 48 hours of his artwork being added. Wanksy has claimed inspiration from Grayson Perry and Banksy.

Bury council denied that the phalluses sped up repairs to potholes, describing the graffiti as obscene and offensive. Wanksy denied that the graffiti penises were offensive, stating that not fixing the potholes is more offensive. Wanksy later speculated that the council may be deliberating not repairing phallic potholes. As of 2024, Wanksy was still active.

Wanksy has been noted as an example of activist graffiti, exploiting the fact that obscene graffiti gets fixed by local governments as a priority, even where pothole repairs are not.

== Similar artists ==
The original Wanksy inspired other guerilla artists across the United Kingdom and abroad. In March 2016, the "Cock Lane Crusader" spray painted penises around potholes in Fetcham, Surrey. In November 2016, a similar artist was arrested in Florida. In April 2018, similar penis graffiti pothole art was created in Cambridge. In April 2019, similar penis graffiti pothole art was created in Middlesbrough. From 2018 to 2021, Geoff Upson sprayed penises around potholes in Auckland, New Zealand.
