= Moon baronets of Copsewood Grange (1887) =

Escutcheon of the Moon baronets of Copsewood Grange

The Moon baronetcy, of Copsewood Grange, in the parish of Stoke in the County of Warwick, was created in the Baronetage of the United Kingdom on 22 July 1887 for Richard Moon, Chairman of the London and North Western Railway from 1861 to 1891.

The Official Roll marks the title as "extinct".

== Moon baronets, of Copsewood Grange (1887) ==
- Sir Richard Moon, 1st Baronet (1814–1899)
- Sir Cecil Ernest Moon, 2nd Baronet (1867–1951)
- Sir Richard Moon, 3rd Baronet (1901–1961)
- Sir John Arthur Moon, 4th Baronet (1905–1979)
- Sir Edward Moon, 5th Baronet (1911–1988)
- Sir Roger Moon, 6th Baronet (1914–2017), succeeded his brother.
- Humphrey Moon, presumed 7th Baronet (1919–2022), brother of the 6th Baronet.

== Notes ==
Baronetage of the United Kingdom
Preceded by Pearce baronets	Moon baronets of Copsewood Grange; 22 July 1887	Succeeded by Philipps baronets
