= Deal barracks bombing =

Incident in southern England during The Troubles

- Part of The Troubles
- Location: 51°12′49″N 1°24′0″E; Royal Marine barracks, Deal, Kent, England
- Date: 22 September 1989; 08:22 (GMT)
- Target: Royal Marines School of Music
- Attack type: Time bomb
- Deaths: 11
- Injuries: 21
- Perpetrator: Provisional IRA

The Deal barracks bombing was an attack by the Provisional Irish Republican Army (IRA) on the Royal Marine Depot, Deal, England. It took place at 8:22 am on 22 September 1989, when the IRA exploded a time bomb at the Royal Marines School of Music building. The building collapsed, killing 11 marines from the Royal Marines Band Service and wounding another 21.

== Background ==
The Royal Marines School of Music is a professional training centre for musicians of the Royal Marines Band Service, the musical arm of the Royal Navy. Originally created at Portsmouth in 1930, it moved to Deal in 1950 and in 1989 was still there as part of the Royal Marine Depot, Deal. Throughout the 1980s, the IRA had been waging a paramilitary campaign against targets in Britain and Northern Ireland with the stated aim of achieving the separation of Northern Ireland from the rest of the United Kingdom. These operations had included an attempt to kill the British Prime Minister Margaret Thatcher in 1984 and a similar attack on a military band in London in 1982.

== Explosion ==
At 8:22am on 22 September 1989, a 15-pound (6.8 kg) time bomb detonated in the recreational centre changing room at the Royal Marines School of Music. The blast destroyed the recreational centre, levelled the three-storey accommodation building next to it and caused extensive damage to the rest of the base and nearby civilian homes. The blast was heard several kilometres away, shaking windows in the centre of Deal, and creating a large pall of smoke over the town. Most of the personnel who used the building as a barracks had already risen and were practising marching on the parade ground when the blast occurred. These marines witnessed the buildings collapse, and many of the teenaged personnel were in a state of shock for days afterwards.

Some marines had remained behind in the building, and thus received the full force of the explosion. Many were trapped in the rubble for hours and military heavy lifting equipment was needed to clear much of it. Kent Ambulance Service voluntarily agreed to end its industrial strike action to aid those wounded by the blast. Ten marines died at the scene with most trapped in the collapsed building, although one body was later found on the roof of a nearby house. Another 21 were seriously injured and received treatment at hospitals in Dover, Deal and Canterbury. One of these men, 21-year-old Christopher Nolan, died of his injuries on 18 October 1989. Three of those killed were buried nearby at the Hamilton Road Cemetery, Deal. The names of the victims were - Msn Mick Ball, 24, Msn Andy Cleatheroe, 25, Msn Trevor Davis, 39, Msn Richard Fice, 22, Msn Richard "Taff" Jones, 27, Band Cpl David "Mac" McMillan, 26, Msn Christopher Nolan, 21, Band Cpl Dean Pavey, 31, Msn Mark Petch, 26, Msn Tim Reeves, 24 and Msn Bob Simmonds, 34.

== Reactions ==
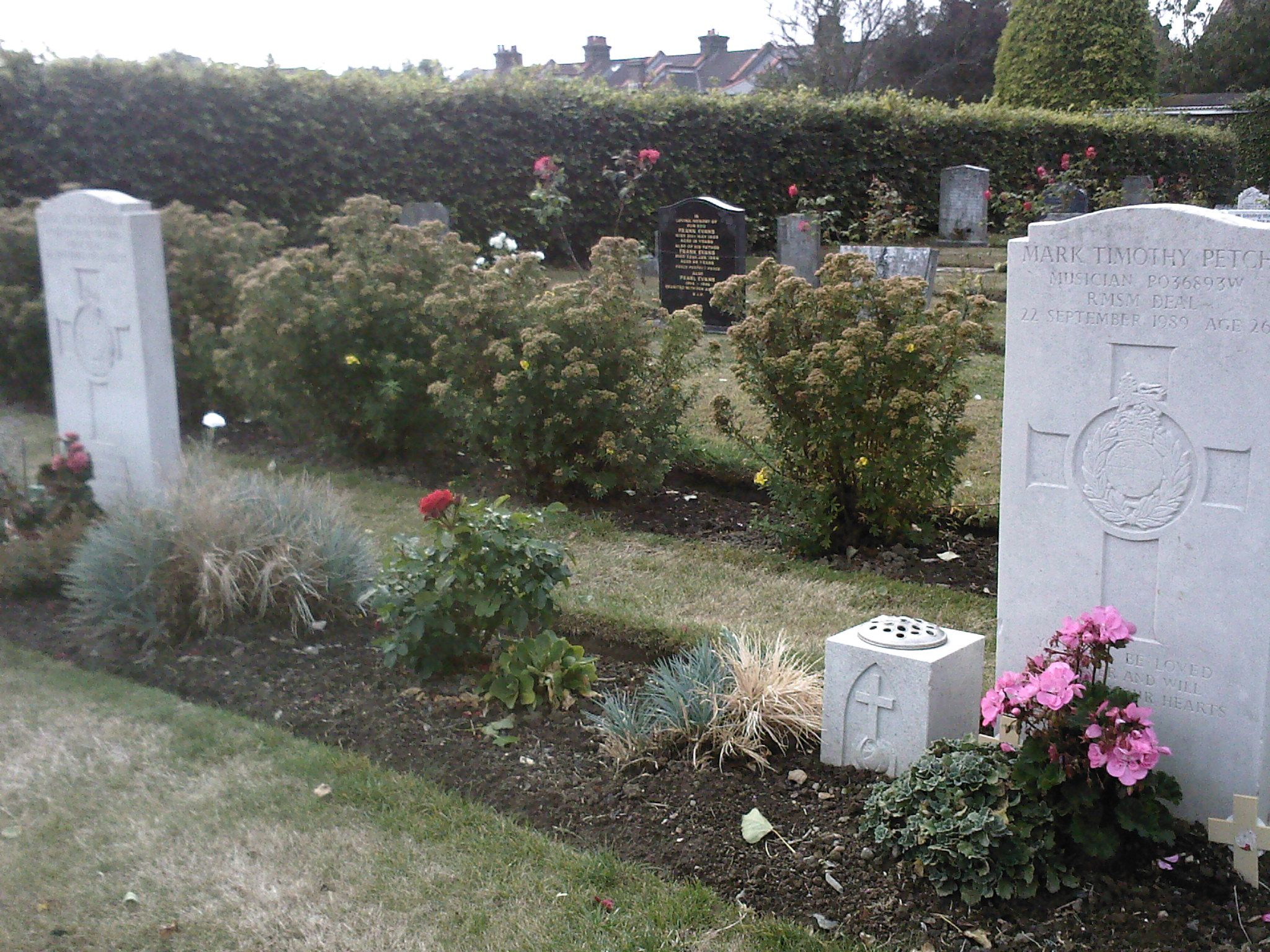
Grave of Mark Petch, one of the dead bandsmen

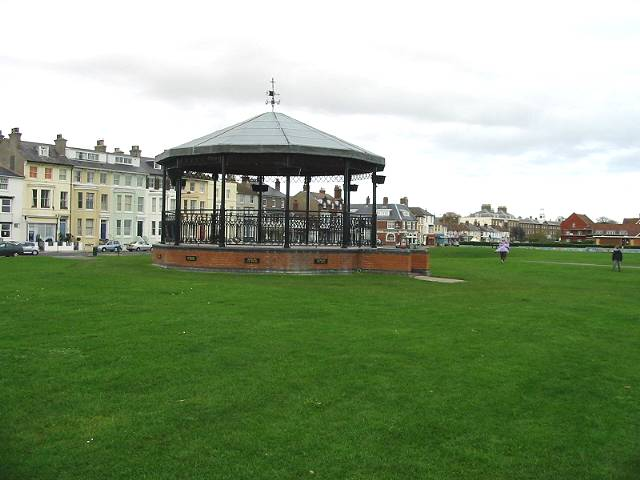
Memorial bandstand at Walmer Green

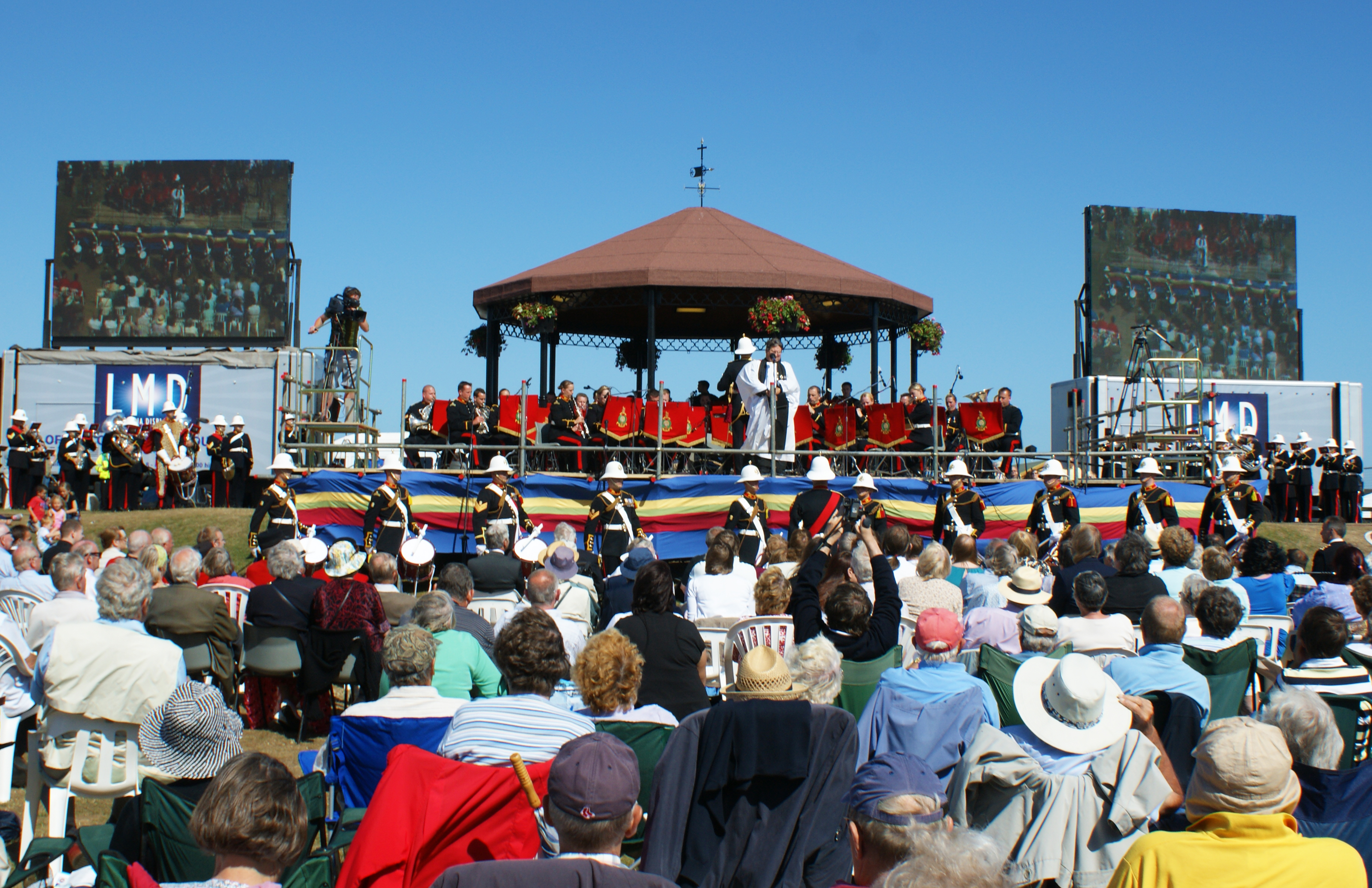
20th Anniversary Concert and Memorial Service at Deal Bandstand, 12 July 2009

The IRA claimed responsibility for the bombing, saying it was a continuation of their campaign to rid Northern Ireland of all British troops who had been deployed there since 1969. Many British people were shocked by the attack, carried out on a ceremonial military band whose military training was mostly geared towards saving lives. The public were also shocked by the ages of those killed, as many were new recruits to the School and most of those injured were teenagers.

The British Government also condemned the IRA's attack. Prime Minister Margaret Thatcher made a statement from Moscow, where she was on an official visit, saying that she was "shocked and extremely sad". Leader of the opposition, Neil Kinnock, described the attack as an "awful atrocity" and said, "Even the people who say they support what the IRA calls its cause must be sickened by the way in which such death and injury is mercilessly inflicted".

The Commandant General Royal Marines Lieutenant-General Sir Martin Garrod appeared on television soon after the bombing, condemning the bombers as "thugs, extortionists, torturers, murderers and cowards – the scum of the earth" and "We will emerge stronger and more determined than ever before to end and destroy this foul and dark force of evil."

The base's security caused controversy as this was partly provided by a private security firm. This arrangement prompted a thorough review of security procedures at all British military bases and the replacement of the firm's employees at Deal with Royal Marine guards.

One week after the bombing, the staff and students of the School of Music marched through the town of Deal, watched and applauded by thousands of spectators. They maintained gaps in their ranks to mark the positions of those unable to march through death or serious injury. A memorial bandstand was constructed at Walmer Green to the memory of those who "only ever wanted to play music". A memorial in the Deal Barracks chapel was destroyed when the building burnt down in 2003, but the site is now a memorial garden. The surviving barracks at Deal were converted into flats when the base was decommissioned in 1996, and the School of Music is once again based in Portsmouth.

Every year the Royal Marines Band from Portsmouth visit the memorial bandstand in Deal to pay their respects to those who died in the bombing. In July 2009, a memorial concert and re-dedication ceremony was held at the bandstand on Walmer Green, attended by thousands. The event drew over 12,000 spectators in 2019, which marked the 30th anniversary of the bombing.

Deal Parochial Church of England School now stands in the former barracks' Drill Fields. A large carved stone bearing the Globe and Laurel (the cap badge and emblem of the Royal Marines) sits at the entrance of the school. It originally adorned one of the buildings facing the parade square in the barracks. On Tuesday 22 September 2015, the 26th anniversary of the bombing, following a restoration of the stone by the school's Year 6 pupils, the school held a re-dedication service to mark the role played by the Royal Marines in the town.

No one has ever been arrested or convicted in connection with the Deal bombing.

== See also ==
- Timeline of the Northern Ireland Troubles
- Timeline of Provisional Irish Republican Army actions
- List of unsolved murders in the United Kingdom (1980s)
