= Graham-Moon baronets =

Escutcheon of the Graham-Moon baronets

The Moon, later Graham-Moon baronetcy, of Portman Square in the County of Middlesex, was created in the Baronetage of the United Kingdom on 4 May 1855 for the art publisher Francis Moon. He was Lord Mayor of London for 1854/5.

The Official Roll marks the title as "vacant".

== Moon, later Graham-Moon baronets, of Portman Square (1855) ==
- Sir Francis Graham Moon, 1st Baronet (1796–1871)
- Sir Edward Graham Moon, 2nd Baronet (1825–1904)
- Sir Francis Sidney Graham-Moon, 3rd Baronet (1855–1911)
- Sir (Arthur) Wilfred Graham-Moon, 4th Baronet (1905–1954)
- Sir Peter Wilfred Giles Graham-Moon, 5th Baronet (1942–2023)
- Sir Rupert Francis Wilfred Graham-Moon, presumed 6th Baronet (born 1968), son of the 5th Baronet
