= Church of St Mary, Fetcham =

Church in Surrey, England

St Mary's Church, Fetcham
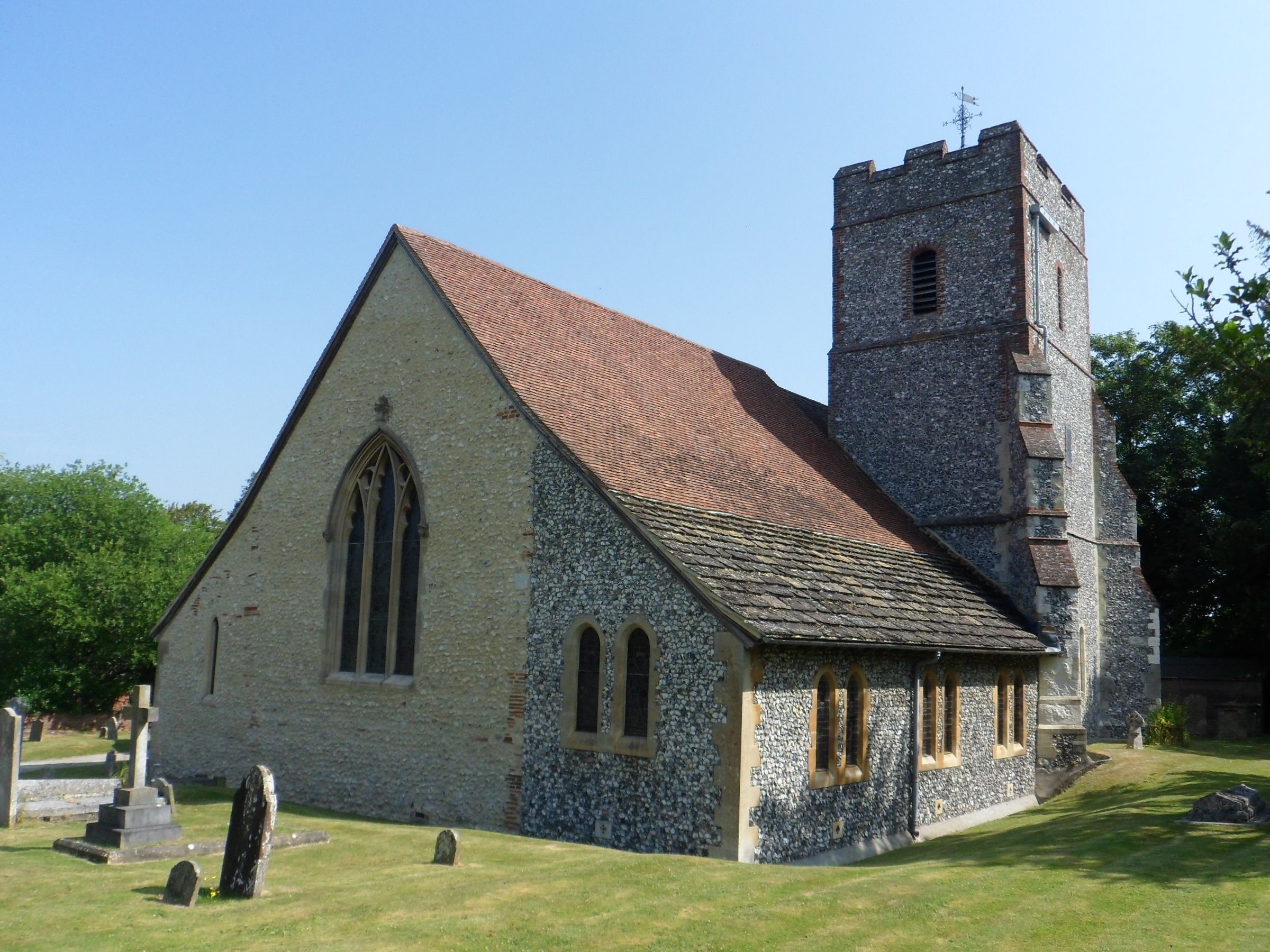
- St Mary's Church, Fetcham

- 51°17′17″N 0°21′11″W
- Denomination: Church of England
- Churchmanship: Evangelical
- Website: https://stmarysfetcham.org.uk/

History
- Dedication: St Mary

Administration
- Province: Canterbury
- Diocese: Guildford
- Archdeaconry: Dorking
- Deanery: Leatherhead
- Parish: Fetcham

Clergy
- Rector: Rev. Pouya Heidari

St Mary's Church, Fetcham, Surrey, England is a Church of England parish church (community) but also refers to its building which dates to the 11th century, that of the Norman Conquest and as such is the settlement's oldest building. It is set off the residential road of its address, The Ridgeway, behind a small park, in the suburban part of the largely 20th century railway settlement adjoining the M25 London Orbital Motorway which has retained farmed rural outskirts. The closest secular building is Grade II* listed Fetcham Park House, which is in the same architectural category and the church has an adjoining church hall.

== Structure and fittings ==
Built during Anglo-Saxon and early Norman periods, the structure has been conjectured by the Victoria County History's architectural analysis to have been a redevelopment of an Anglo-Saxon church:

Roman bricks in considerable quantities in Fetcham Church, remains of Anglo-Saxon architecture in the church...
...quoins and dressings of thin red bricks, no doubt Roman, set in wide mortar joints.

Traces of its long past exist in many parts of its structure. These include the south-west quoin of the nave, and a single splay window high on the south wall with traces of Roman brick, as well as arches which fit with the architecture prevailing before the Norman Conquest of 1066.

In the 19th century a considerable amount of restoration and improvement in the church was carried out by Rev. Sir Edward Moon rector from 1854 to 1904. Moon inherited his baronetcy in 1871 on the death of his father Sir Francis Moon, 1st Baronet, who was commemorated in much of the restoration work in the church. The work included the addition of some mid-Victorian stained glass windows.

In 1857 a 13th century wall painting was uncovered at the East end of the North aisle. The original painting no longer exists although a full size copy is available for viewing through Guilford Library service and a photo of it is included in the reference.

The church gained Grade II* listed status in 1951.

== Services ==
On Sundays there are Communion Services at 08.00 (Book of Common Prayer) and 09.30 (Common Worship). At 11.15 there is Informal Worship, with the Gener8 All Age worship taking place on the first Sunday in the month.

On Sunday evenings there is Choral Evensong (second Sunday), RESTORE Cafe Church (third Sunday) and REFLECT reflective service (fourth Sunday).

There is also a midweek communion service on Thursday at 10.00am and a parish prayer meeting at 09.30 on Saturday.

== Monuments ==
The church has wall monuments to Anthony Rous and Henry Vincent (a praying bust with an open book, in a cartouche with Corinthian small columns), both died 1631; in the left side of the porch is a large lettered tablet dated 1717 recording details of a charitable trust as administered among its mainstay of poor relief for centuries by the parish, until the advent of local government in the United Kingdom.

== Gallery ==
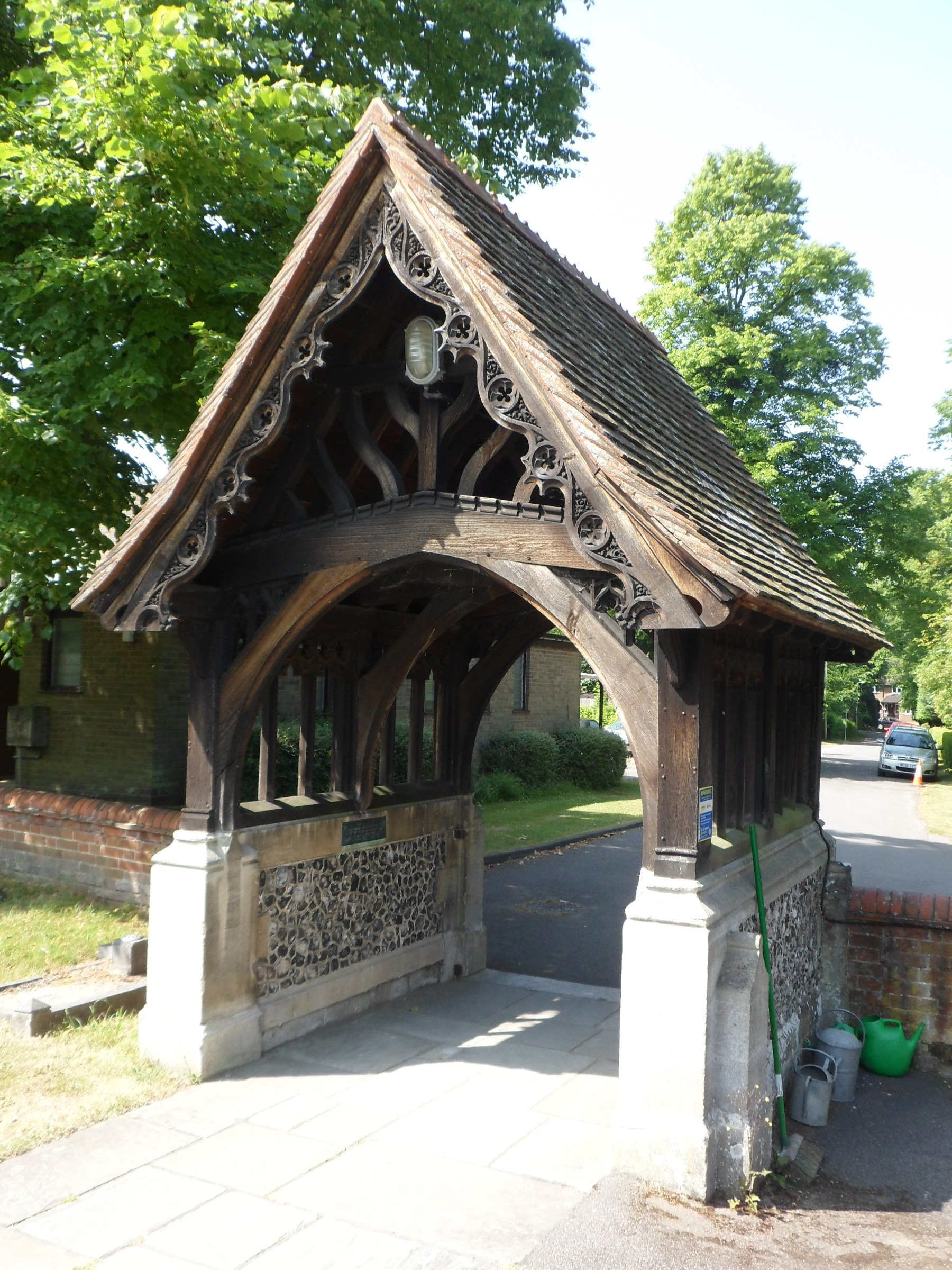
Lychgate

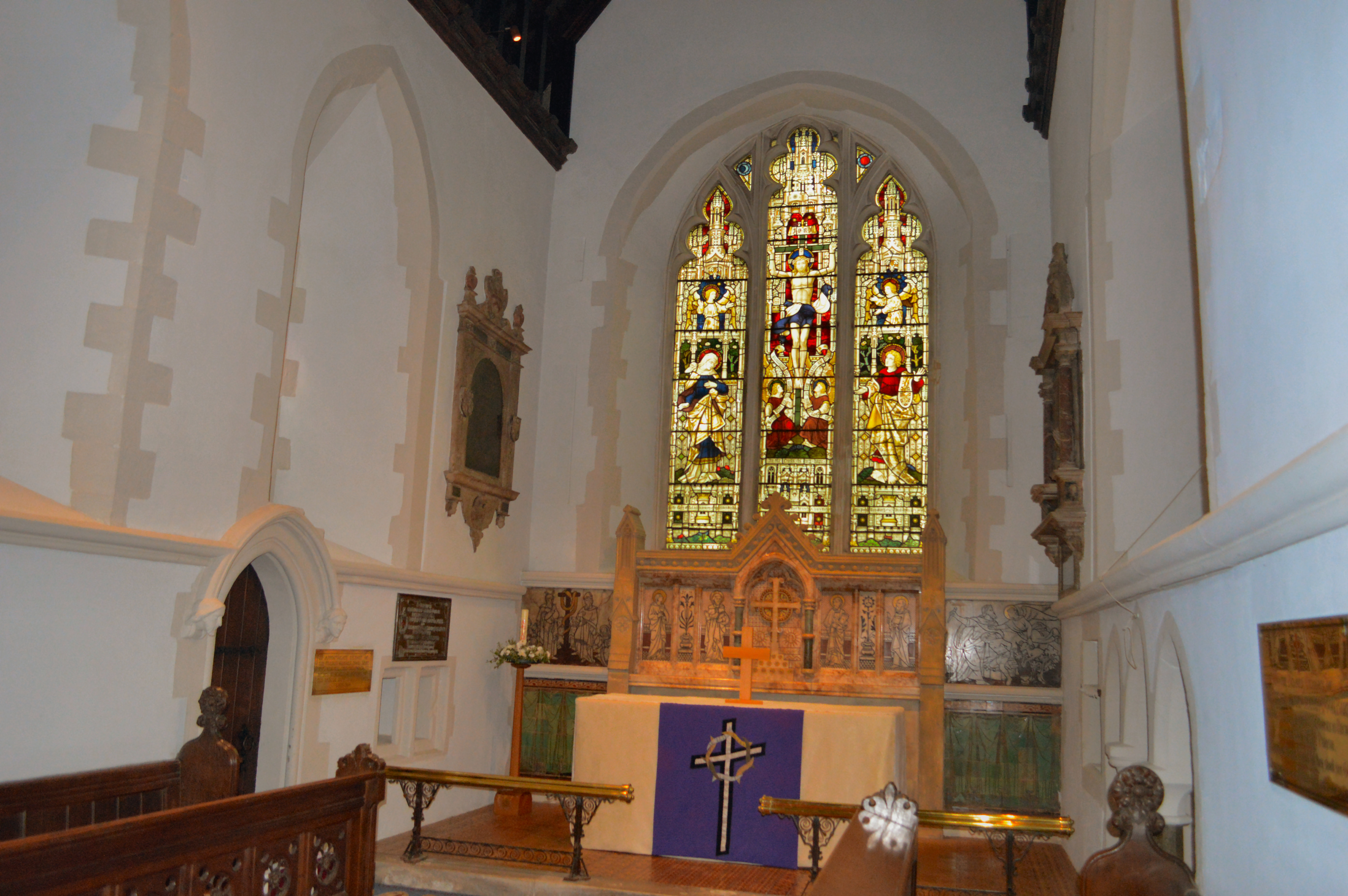
Chancel

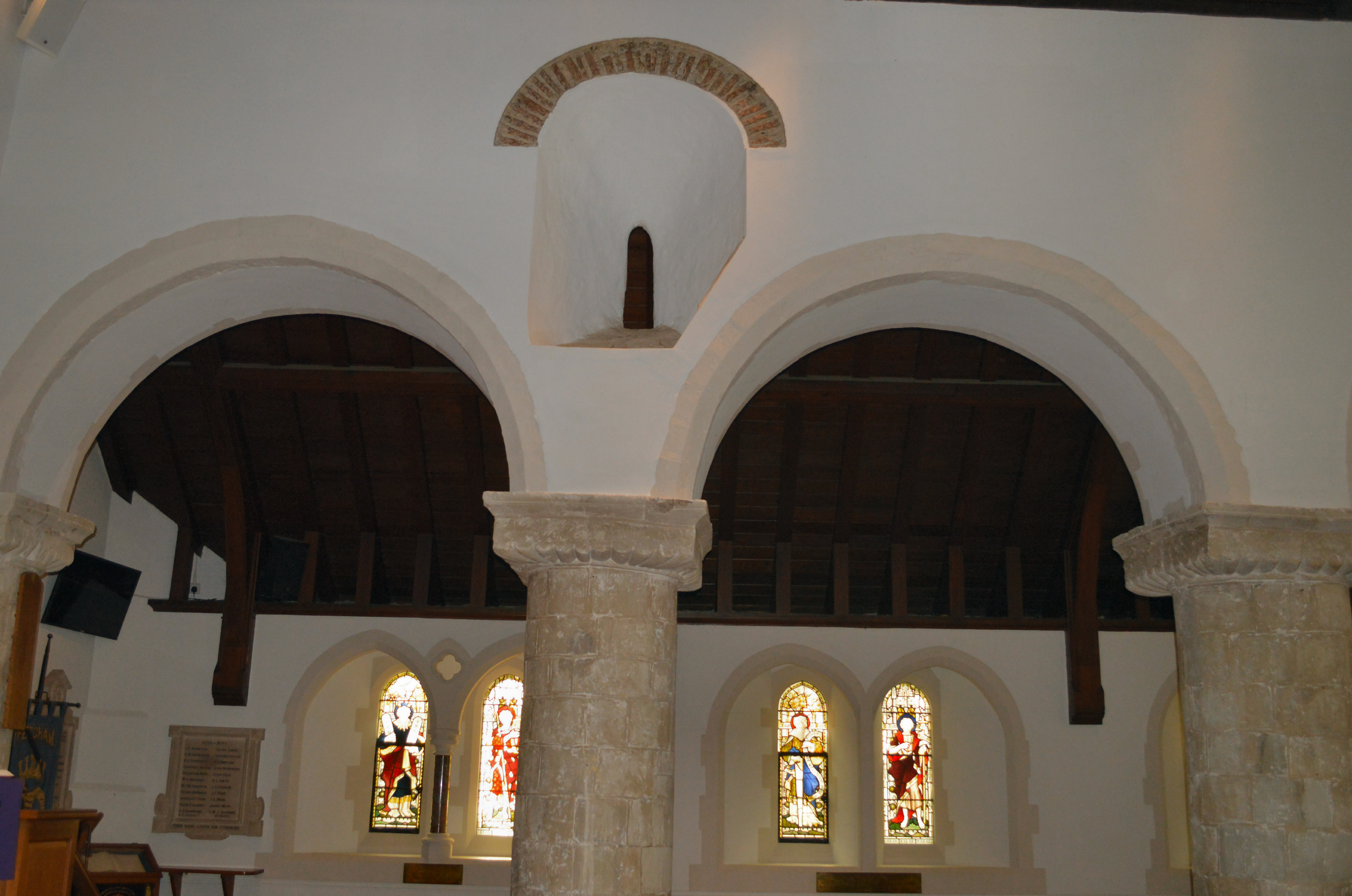
Norman pillars and Saxon window

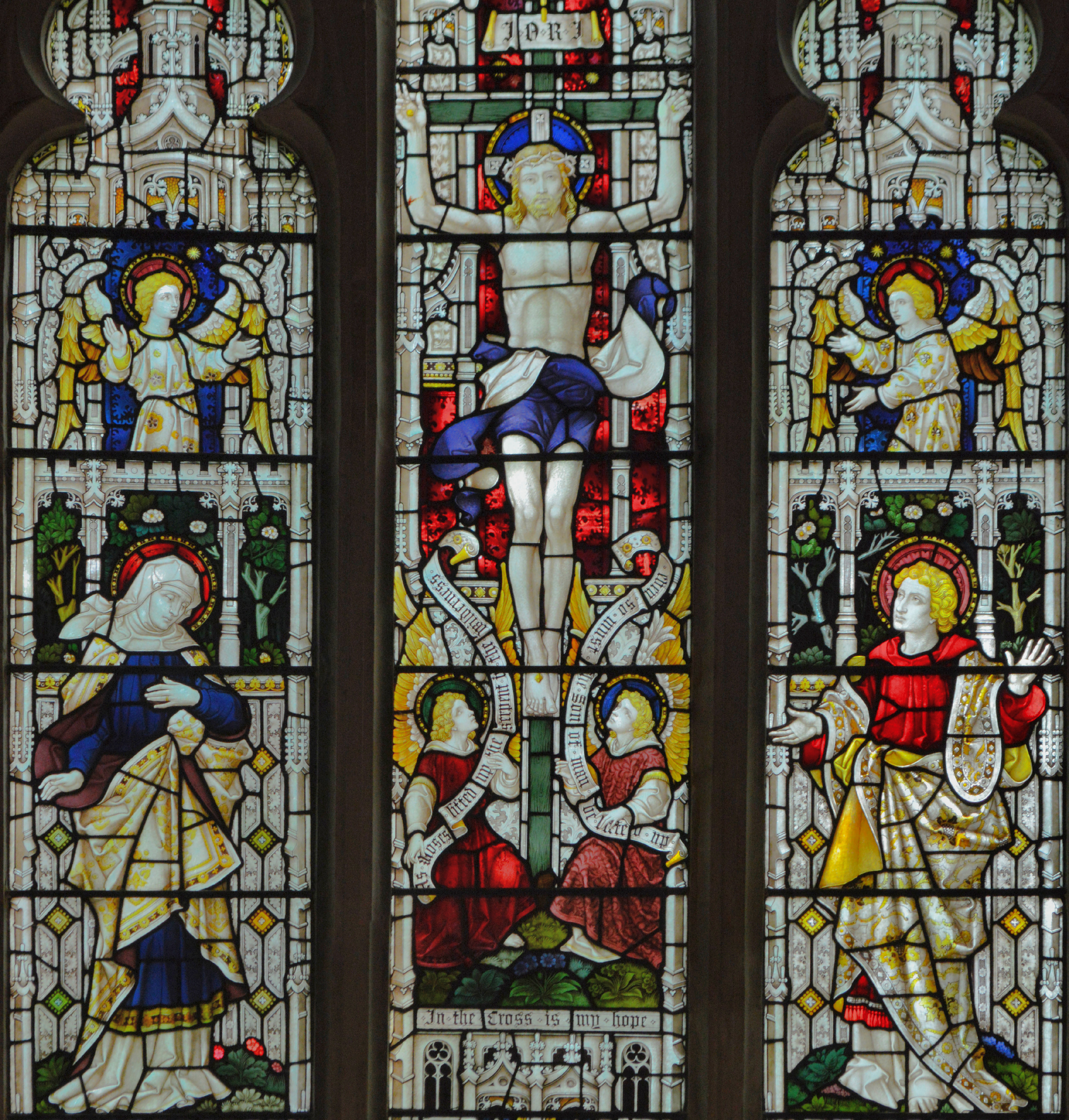
East window

== See also ==
- List of places of worship in Mole Valley
