= State Cinema =

Historic cinema venue in Grays, England

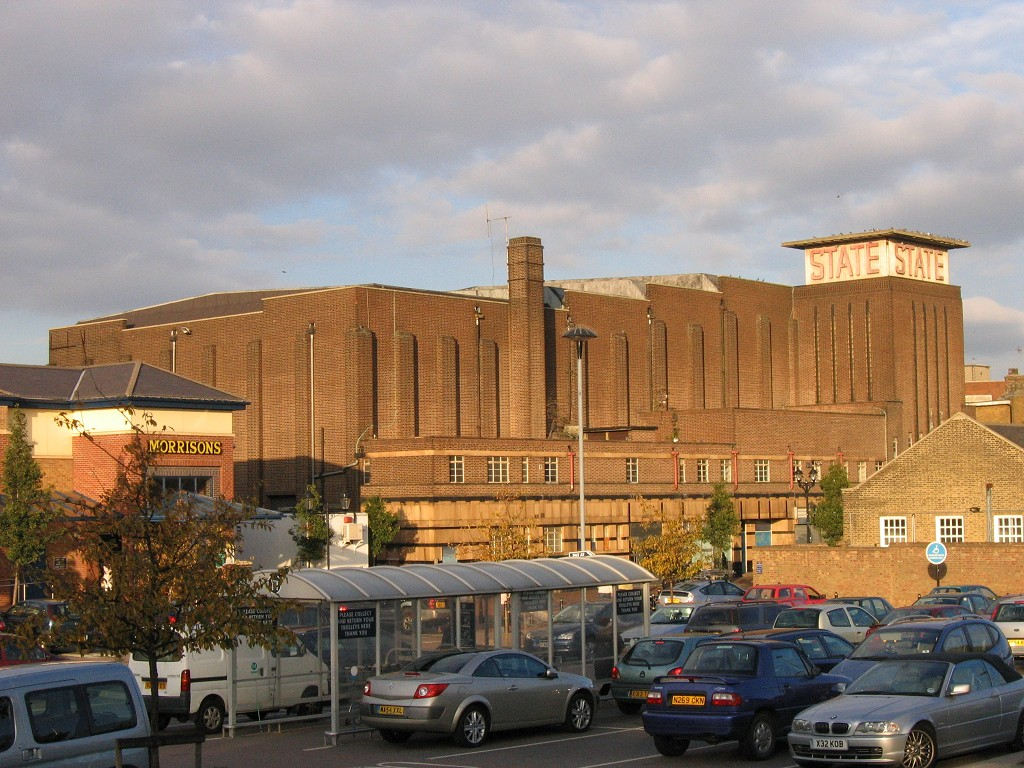
- State Cinema in November 2007
- Interactive map of the State Cinema area

General information
- Architectural style: Art-deco
- Location: Grays, England
- Coordinates: 51.4775°N 0.321667°E
- Construction started: October 1937
- Completed: July 1938; 87 years ago
- Cost: £100,000
- Client: Frederick's Electric Theatres
- Owner: London based businessman Naveed Ahmad via his property development company London Developments Global Ltd

Design and construction
- Architect: F. G. M. Chancellor
- Engineer: G.H. Buckle

The State Cinema is a Grade II* Listed building in Grays, Essex. Designed by F. G. M. Chancellor under Matcham & Co., it opened in 1938 as one of the most modern cinemas of its type at the time with seating for 2200 people. As a cinema, it closed in 1988 but has held numerous events and been used for various purposes since. Historic England describe the cinema as being "one of the best preserved of the super cinemas of the late 1930s."

In recent years, the building has been vandalised and pilfered from and has suffered water damage from a failing roof system. Its decay was so bad that it was entered onto Historic England's Heritage at Risk Register on which it was assessed as being "very bad". The building was bought by Wetherspoons in 2018 for conversion to public house. Works commenced in 2019 but stalled in 2020. The building has been put up for sale by Wetherspoons as of October 2022. The building was sold pre-auction in May 2023 to London-based businessman Naveed Ahmad via his property development company London Developments Global for an undisclosed amount. London Developments Global is now commencing repairs on the roof only after the council have ordered them to, after the company neglected it for nearly 2 years.

== History ==
State Cinema logo

The building itself was designed by architect F. G. M. Chancellor who had been bequeathed Frank Matcham & Co., from Matcham upon his death in 1920. Chancellor also owned Frederick's Electric Theatres Company. The State Cinema was built at a cost of £100,000 and twenty houses in George Street were demolished to make room for it. It became one of the largest cinemas in Essex, and featured air conditioning and an illuminated Compton Organ. It also had full stage facilities enable it to change into a fully functioning theatre or live entertainment venue. The cinema opened its doors at 7:30pm on Monday 5 September 1938 showing the film The Hurricane.

In the 1970s, the first signs of possible closure reared its head, the stalls were closed off, cuts to staffing were made and the organ fell silent. A campaign was launched to keep the cinema open and the then owners, Mecca Leisure Group, decided to spend £20,000 on improvements to bring audiences back to the old cinema.

In 1982, work began to restore the old organ by a group of volunteers who later became known as "Friends of the State", eight weeks later music was again heard in the building and a series of Sunday afternoon concerts were held, many of which were attended by recording enthusiasts who wanted to capture the sounds of the unique organ.

The building remained unaltered throughout its life as a cinema, perhaps due in part to its location or not demanding further screens. Once again falling audiences, possibly due to the development of multi-screen cinemas and the rising popularity of video film rental saw the State threatened with closure in the mid-1980s. Owners Mecca eventually left the building, a closing night event was held on 5 September 1988 and the film that opened the cinema 50 years ago to the day was shown once more.

The land and the cinema were earmarked for redevelopment and bulldozers were soon brought in, however a preservation order was quickly sought and the State became a Grade II listed building preventing its demolition.

After the closure, the cinema was handed over to a small independent operator who in 1989 rebadged the building "The Grays State Theatre". Films continued to be shown and organ concerts were once again a feature of the programme as was the £1 entry ticket. Alas, the business model didn't provide enough income to sustain the cinema and it closed again soon after.

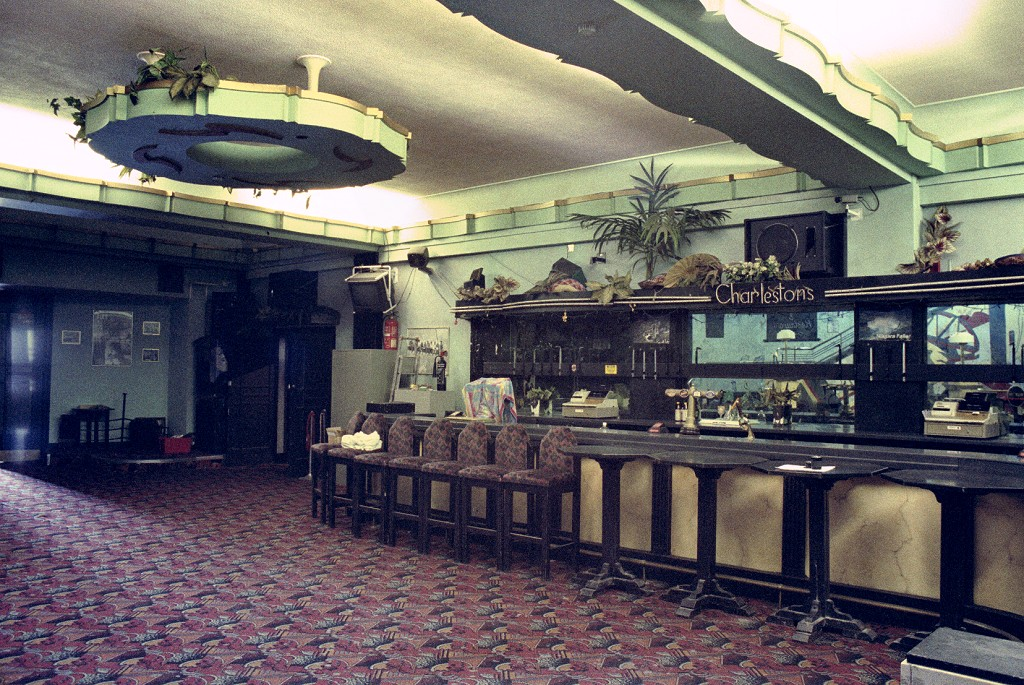
Charlestons nightclub bar

In 1991, the building again came back into use, this time as a wine bar and nightclub called Charlestons. It opened at 8:30pm on Thursday 28 January and included live music from The Merseybeats and Dave Berry and the Cruisers. More live music, a number of variety and film shows plus several boxing matches were held at the venue, and the club also saw the return of the Sunday organ concerts. The club lasted for seven years before closing in 1998.

The local council received a planning application in August 1998 from the Peniel Pentecostal Church to establish a church in the now disused building. The application was dismissed early the following year as was the subsequent appeal.

In February 2000, the Thurrock Heritage Forum approached English Heritage to suggest that the listing on the cinema be upgraded and on 28 June 2000 the building was reclassified as Grade II* to preserve the art-Deco interior.

The same month Thurrock Council gave planning permission to supermarket chain Morrisons to build a store on the State's old car park after purchasing the site for £10 million. Promises were made to Thurrock Council that Morrisons continue the upkeep of the cinema and restore the old building; to that end after an inspection in June 2001 revealed some water damage Morrisons sealed the leak to prevent any further damage.

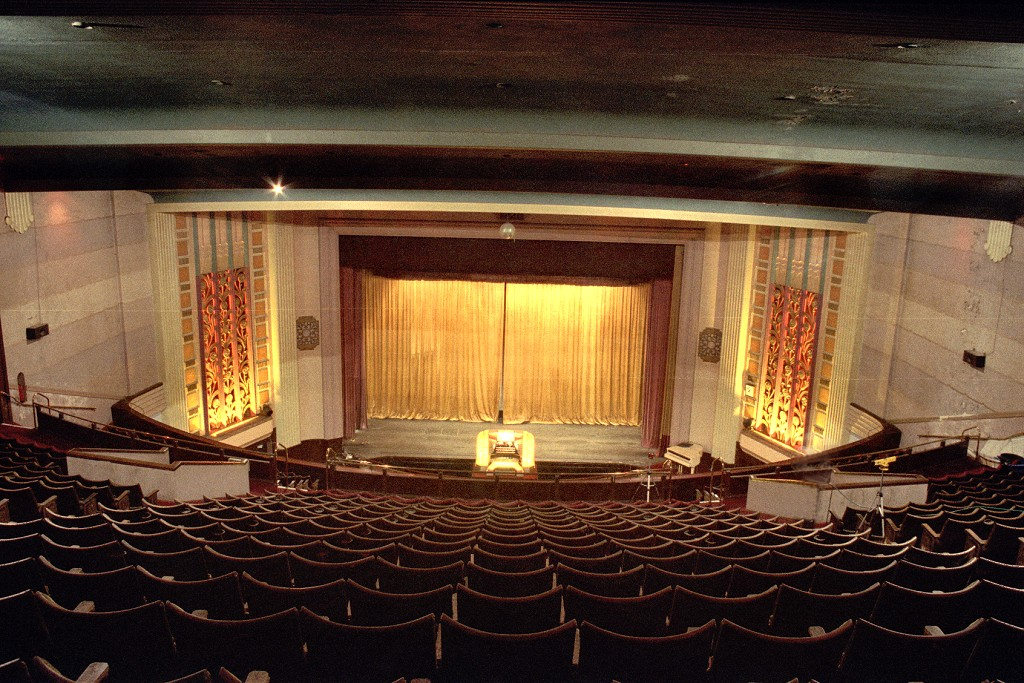
The 2200 seat auditorium pictured from the circle

In 2003, Morrisons conducted a survey of the State and found the cinema still to be "structurally in sound condition and built to a good standard." The report continued: "Of major concern however, is the damage being caused to the building by water ingress through defective roof covering and through the walls due to a defective rainwater drainage system and cracked or missing mortar caps to walls" and "many of the internal fixtures and fittings are also suffering decay due to the water ingress." The report concluded "whilst alternatively it may be possible to patch those areas of the roof which are suffering most acutely, the problem will tend to progressively develop elsewhere as other areas of the roof finishes perish" and "on the auditorium roof repair of the gutter linings alone is not considered sufficient as leaks are also occurring through other areas of the roof."

The building ceased to be part of Morrisons plans once the supermarket was complete and was sold in October 2006 amid criticism about its upkeep. The new owners, TSP Properties Ltd, purchased the State for £550,000 and although the company stated that it wouldn't be used as a cinema again they wished to redevelop it into a new leisure hub. The following year, the gutters outside were replaced temporarily to prevent further water damage however it was discovered that the roof was desperate need of repair.

Several campaigns have taken place over recent years to highlight the state of the cinema and to kick-start a restoration. The most recent campaign pressured the current owners to release a statement to BBC Radio Essex on 11 February 2008 claiming that they had worked with English Heritage and the building was now watertight, dry and clean inside and the organ had been fully restored.

However, more recent investigations by members of the Save the State campaign have found that the roof does in fact still leak (as of March 2008 when a council inspection was undertaken) and that although the organ works to a certain extent, it has not been "fully restored". The organ is now in a very poor condition after a burglary in July 2011, in which most of its original metal pipes and fittings were stolen.

In 2015, the cinema was bought by J D Wetherspoon for conversion into a pub, and work began in 2019.

== Compton Organ ==
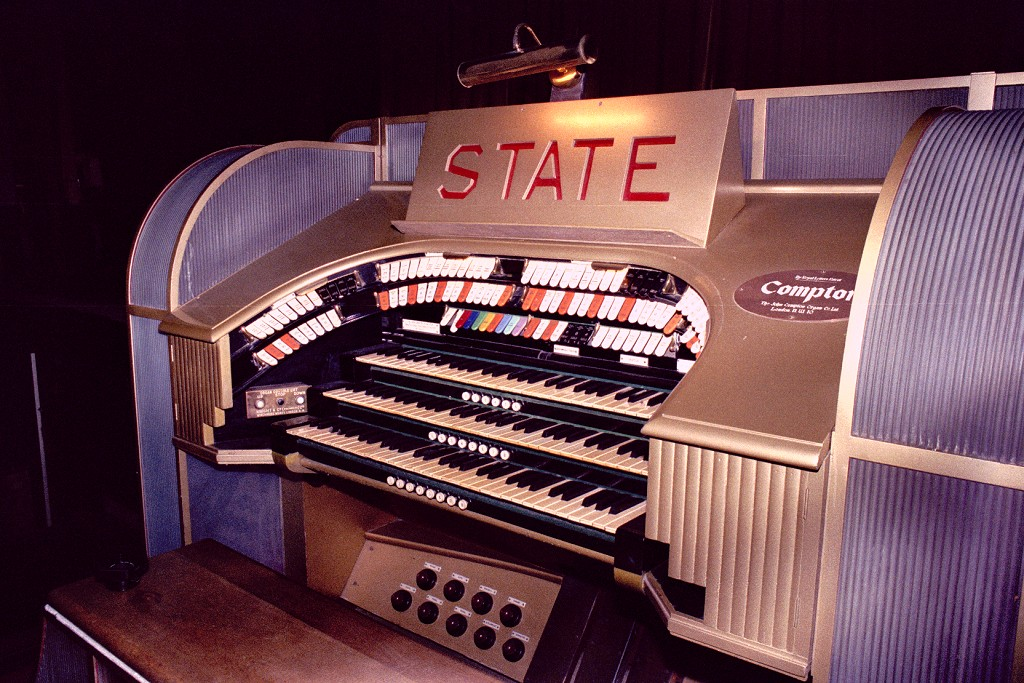
The Compton Organ

In front of the centre of the stage is a fully illuminated three manual 6 rank Compton organ which is able to rise from the orchestra pit on a lift. It can be seen being played in a BBC TV production of Dennis Potter's Lipstick on Your Collar.

This is a pipe organ and contains about 500 organ pipes which are housed in two chambers beneath the stage. The sound is allowed out into the orchestra pit (and hence into the auditorium) through swell shutters – large wooden louvres controlled by the organist. The organ also has a Compton patent Melotone unit which was a supplement to the pipes and produced sounds electronically. The Melotone sounds were fed through a large horn loudspeaker which is still present in the organ chambers at the State

Cinemas of the 1920s and 30s usually had pipe organs installed, originally as a means of accompanying silent films but then to provide musical entertainment before and after the film shows and during intervals.

In the UK, there were nearly 500 such organs in cinemas by 1939, however fewer than 80 now survive in one form or another and only a handful of these are still in their original buildings.

In July 2011, the State Cinema was broken into and a significant number of metal fixtures and fittings was taken. Included in this burglary were all but a handful of the Compton organ's original pipes, virtually worthless as scrap as they are formed of an alloy which would require costly processing to release the constituent metals, but worth around £10,000 to replace with remade equivalents.

The Compton organ was removed from the cinema by JD Wetherspoon and was being restored. Its current location is unknown.

== Filmography ==
Shortly before its closure, the cinema was used to film a short piece of Who Framed Roger Rabbit, and was featured for about three minutes on-screen. The cinema can also be seen in the music video for the Jamiroquai single "Deeper Underground": the song was one of the songs for the Godzilla soundtrack. In the video, the monster is seen crashing through the cinema screen. It also featured in the film Chicago Joe and the Showgirl, and episodes of the television series Jericho and Lipstick on Your Collar.
