= Richard Moon =

English railway executive (1814–1899)

Sir Richard Moon, 1st Baronet (1814–1899) was the leading executive of the London and North Western Railway (LNWR) during its heyday as the largest public company in the world. He was chairman from June 1861 until he retired on 22 February 1891.

== Early life ==
Richard Moon was born in Liverpool (birth registered on 23 September 1814), the elder son of merchant Richard Moon (1783–1842) and his wife Elizabeth, daughter of William Bradley Frodsham, of Liverpool.

In 1830 the family firm of Moon Brothers was the sixth largest cotton importer in the city and dominated its trade with Brazil, where some members were based. From 1828 to 1830 the younger Richard Moon completed his secondary education at the University of St Andrews, without taking a degree. While English students at Scottish universities were usually Nonconformists, there is no evidence of this for the Moons. His father died in 1842, leaving a substantial sum of money with instructions that it should be invested on the family's behalf in docks and railways, recommending in particular the Liverpool and Manchester Railway, the Grand Junction Railway, and the London & Birmingham Railway. A few months later, his uncle John also died in Brazil. As their heir, executor, and trustee for the family, the younger Richard Moon was now a wealthy man and his focus shifted from trading in Liverpool to managing these substantial shareholdings.

== London and North Western Railway ==
In 1846 the three railways merged to form the London and North Western Railway, which over the following decades became the largest public company in the world. As an activist investor, Moon became a member of the Board. In April 1852 he was appointed chairman of the Stores Committee, which under Moon came to control all the railway's purchases, from coal for the locomotives down to the buttons on staff uniforms, with a relentless focus on reducing costs. He was particularly obsessed with expenditure on gas, demanding in 1856 that every station keep daily records of how many hours each light was kept burning.

In 1853, the board appointed Moon to a subcommittee investigating the railway's expenses and he became their spokesman. The major question they studied was the future of the multiple rolling stock works that the LNWR had inherited from its predecessors, with major facilities at Crewe (from the GJR), Longsight in Manchester (M&BR), and Wolverton (L&BR), and smaller depots at Saltley in Birmingham, Edge Hill in Liverpool, Camden & Euston in London, Newton-le-Willows, Ordsall Lane in Salford, and Watford. On the operations side, the company continued to operate almost as three separate railways: the GJR as the Northern District (with Francis Trevithick as Locomotive Superintendent), the M&BR as the North-Eastern (retaining John Ramsbottom), and the L&BR as the Southern District (with motive power under James McConnell). Rationalization was required, but this inevitably meant there would be winners and losers. Moon recommended closing all but one locomotive works, moving all wagon manufacturing to Newton, and creating a consolidated carriages department. After long negotiations, the Board rejected this radical proposal, but closed Edge Hill, Longsight, and Ordsall Lane in favour of Newton, which became the new settlement of Earlestown. He did not give up though and used his role on the Stores Committee, and from 1855 a place on the executive committee, to keep consolidation on the agenda, arguing in a failed Board motion the following year that "a consolidation of the several locomotive departments is very desirable". An opportunity came in 1857 when the LNWR lost the contract to supply rolling stock from the North Eastern works at Longsight to its ally the Lancaster and Carlisle Railway. Moon argued that Longsight would become too small for efficient working, urging that its operations and Superintendent, Ramsbottom, should both be moved to Crewe, since he regarded Trevithick as a weak and disorganized manager. Despite the opposition of Trevithick's friends on the Board, led by Hardman Earle, Moon's proposal was adopted and Trevithick forced out.

An 1858 reorganization expanded Moon's fiefdom into the Stores & Locomotive Expenditure Committee, which declared it would "take charge of the locomotive departments and ... all matters affecting these establishments". With Moon's typical attention to detail, it began with a review of the costs of every locomotive the company had owned since 1850. However, in 1859 Ramsbottom asked for funds to build more workshops at Crewe. Moon instead proposed merging the locomotive departments at Crewe and the carriage works at Wolverton, re-opening the rationalization debate. Both Ramsbottom and McConnell asked the Board to expand their respective works and McConnell claimed it would be more efficient if all trains south of Crewe were transferred to his department. His plea was backed by another influential director, Admiral Moorsom, who had worked closely with him at the Bristol and Gloucester Railway, and eventually the Board agreed to the Crewe boundary and both expansions. Moon did not believe McConnell's promises of efficiency and resigned as Stores Committee chairman and Special (executive) Committee member, disgusted at his defeat.

Moon was appointed deputy chair of the board in February 1861, and was elected chairman in June of that year. He chose to act as an executive chair or managing director. As chairman, concerned with costs, he concentrated locomotive construction at Crewe, and carriage construction at Wolverton.

== Other railways ==
Moon also founded the Snowdon Mountain Railway in Wales, in association with George Assheton-Smith, which opened in 1896.

== Personal life ==
Moon lived in Bevere, a small hamlet on the banks of the River Severn, in Claines parish, Worcestershire, from 1849 to 1863. At the parish vestry meeting on 24 April 1851 he was elected as Vicar's Churchwarden. After moving to Copsewood Grange, east of Coventry, he invested in Joseph Cash's attempts to manufacture artificial silk.

Moon married Eleanor (1820–1891), daughter of John Brocklebank, of Hazelholm, Whitehaven, Cumberland, a former officer of the West Cumberland Volunteers, in 1840; they had three sons and two daughters.

Moon was created a baronet, of Copsewood Grange, in the parish Stoke, in the County of Warwick, in the Baronetage of the United Kingdom, on 22 July 1887. He was succeeded in the baronetcy by his grandson, Cecil Ernest Moon (son of Sir Richard's eldest son, Edward, who died in 1893). He is buried at St. Bartholomew's Church, Coventry.

Richard Moon Street in Crewe is named after him.

== Sources ==
- Chisholm, Hugh, ed. (1911). "Moon, Sir Richard" . Encyclopædia Britannica. Vol. 19 (11th ed.). Cambridge University Press.

Baronetage of the United Kingdom
New creation	Baronet (of Copsewood Grange); 1887–1899	Succeeded by Sir Cecil Moon
