= Fetcham =

Village in Surrey, England

Coordinates: 51.290°N 0.352°W

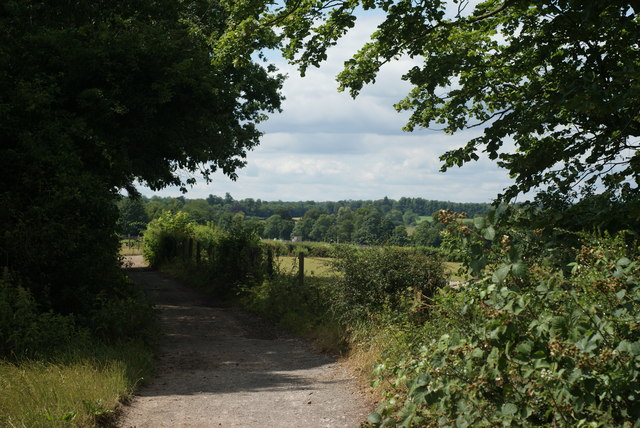
- Bridleway on Fetcham Downs

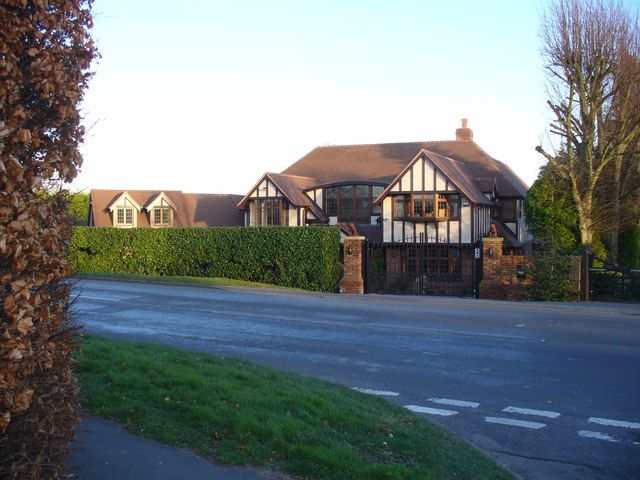
- 20th-century houses in Fetcham

- Location within Surrey
- Area: 9.72 km^{2} (3.75 sq mi)
- Population: 7,996 (2011 census)
  - Density: 823/km^{2} (2,130/sq mi)
- OS grid reference: TQ1455
- Civil parish: n/a
- District: Mole Valley
- Shire county: Surrey
- Region: South East
- Country: England
- Sovereign state: United Kingdom
- Post town: Leatherhead
- Postcode district: KT22
- Dialling code: 01372
- Police: Surrey
- Fire: Surrey
- Ambulance: South East Coast
- UK Parliament: Dorking and Horley

Fetcham is a suburban village in the Mole Valley district, in Surrey, England west of the town of Leatherhead, on the other side of the River Mole and has a mill pond, springs and an associated nature reserve. The housing, as with adjacent Great Bookham, sits on the lower slopes of the North Downs north of Polesden Lacey (NT). Fetcham Grove has Leatherhead and the village's main leisure centre and football club, between the two settlements. Fetcham has two short parades of shops and services, several sports teams and parks and a small number of large pubs and food premises.

Neighbouring Bookham and Leatherhead have railway stations (Note: Bookham railway station is served by half-hourly Effingham Junction services, part of an original route from London to Portsmouth via Guildford, by which London is less than 1 hour away, Leatherhead's typical scheduled time is c. 40 minutes to Central London.) and a junction of the M25 London Orbital Motorway is a 3-mile (4.8-km) journey from it passing alongside the River Mole beyond a brief upland made up of most of Fetcham's remaining farms and wooded Great Bookham Common demarcating Fetcham's northern border. The northern few square miles and the larger North Downs are protected Green Belt, forming a buffer between Stoke D'Abernon (the south of Cobham post town) and Dorking respectively.

== History ==
The name Fetcham is derived from the Anglo-Saxon "Fecca's ham" – Fecca's settlement. Fetcham lay within the Copthorne hundred.

Indeed, there is evidence that there were even earlier settlements, with the discovery of Stone and Bronze Age tools and Roman artefacts, as well as three ancient burial grounds.

Fetcham appears in Domesday Book of 1086 as Feceham. It was held partly by William the Conqueror; partly by Richard from the Bishop of Bayeux partly by Oswald the Thegn. Its Domesday assets were: 7 hides; 5½ mills worth 17s; 10½ ploughs; 2 oxen; 30 acres (12 ha) of meadow; woodland, herbage and pannage worth 23 hogs. It rendered £10 10s 0d per year to its feudal system overlords per year. Fetcham, therefore, was referenced in the Domesday survey as three manors; one known as King's Manor was probably Fetcham Park; another was given to Odo, Bishop of Bayeux after the Norman conquest. The third was an Augustinian foundation from Merton Priory, at Cannon Court, which Henry VIII dissolved in 1538.

Its small manorial farming community numbered 176 in the survey, but halved as a result of the Black Death in 1349. In the first half of the nineteenth century the population was still only around 370. In the 1931 census it had reached 1,318 and by 1972 was 7,331.

St Mary's Church has been a place of Christian worship for over 1000 years. Built during Anglo-Saxon and early Norman periods, it is probably on the site of an even earlier timber church. There are many hints of its past in its structure. These include the south-west quoin of the nave, and a single splay window high on the south wall with traces of Roman brick as well as arches that are presumed to pre-date 1066.

In 1951 the civil parish had a population of 4178. On 1 April 1974 the parish was abolished.

== Topography ==
The village of Fetcham is slightly larger than the English non-city parish average; extending from the River Mole at the village's east side, it is bounded by the neighbouring villages of Great Bookham and Little Bookham on its west.

== Amenities and landmarks ==
Although at the eastern extreme, the historic B2122 Guildford Road/Waterlow Road which has mixed use splits north and east with two bridges to Leatherhead, Fetcham is centred on its own road The Street, with wide-ranging convenience shops, some small restaurants/take-aways, community halls, large public houses as well as nearby churches.

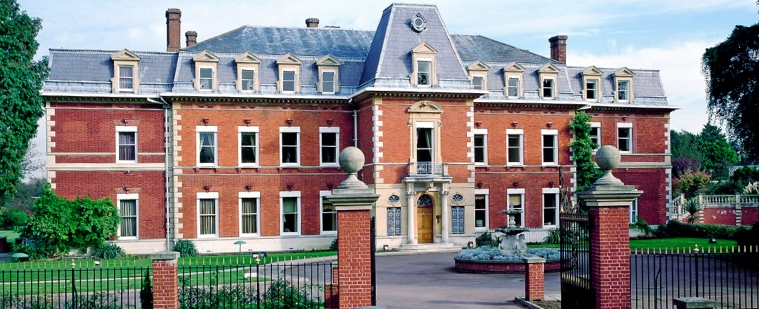
Fetcham Park House front elevation

The Fetcham Conservation Area includes the impressive 18th-century mansion of Fetcham Park House. The Salt Box, The Well House, The Dower House and Ballands Hall are four of a cluster of old buildings in that area. Others are sparingly strewn throughout Fetcham including at Grade II*: Le Pelerin and Thorncroft Manor.

The Mill Pond springs are a large number of chalk springs, still used to supply potable tap water . These springs continued to supply water during the droughts of 1976 and 2006.

There are four Christian congregations in the village:

- Cannon Court Evangelical Church, in Cannonside
- Church of the Holy Spirit (RC), in Bell Lane
- Christ Church Fetcham, which meets in Oakfield Junior School
- St Mary's Church Grade II* listed medieval, off The Ridgeway

To its south are the Fetcham and Leatherhead Downs, which are a part of the North Downs.

== Education ==
There are two village schools:

- Fetcham Infants School for ages 4–7 with an attached pre-school for ages 2½–4. The original school, nearby, opened in 1820. On the present site, the distinctive white former main building, now a classroom, was built in 1854 and added to and enlarged in 1874 and 1886. A four-classroom block and staff room was built in 1936, to accommodate children from the significant residential growth in the village. A new hall and servery were added in 1982.
- Oakfield Junior School for 256 pupils ages 7–11. The present school opened (as Fetcham County School) in September 1963.

== Culture, sport and social life ==
The large Village Hall in The Street is home to several organisations, including Fetcham Village Women's Institute. It was also the venue for several early performances by the 1960s band John's Children, which included sometime frontman Marc Bolan.

There is also a small reading room that can be hired for private functions, on Cobham Road just north of the railway.

There was a social club, called the Fetcham Sports and Social Club, but this closed in 2001 after the membership dwindled. The building is now used as offices.

1st Fetcham Scout Group, headquartered in Cock Lane, has three Cub Scout packs and two Scout Troops, as well as Beavers. Fetcham Explorers share the 1st Fetcham Scout Group hall and facilities.

Fetcham FC football club no longer exists; whilst Fetcham Park United formed in 1971 is now an adult amateur Charter Standard football club affiliated with the Surrey FA. Its two teams play in Division 1 and Division 5 of the Leatherhead & District Sunday Football League. The home ground was formerly the Cock Lane Recreation Ground in Fetcham but the teams now play home games at Priest Hill Playing Fields, in Epsom.

Fetcham's sole pub, The Bell was built in brick in the 1930s on the site of an earlier pub, opposite Fetcham Infants School. It changed ownership several times in the late 20th century until it was bought by the Youngs brewery chain in 2004, when it had a major refit, followed by another in late 2007. The Bell is mentioned in The Good Food Guide and holds a pub quiz on Mondays.

== Transport ==
All parts of the large village are within 1.5 miles (2.4 km) of a railway station giving easy access to London. The M25 motorway's nearest access is J9, just after the one-way square in Leatherhead town centre (enclosing public gardens) or from the south of the village via the Leatherhead bypass and A246. Guildford, Cobham, Epsom and Leatherhead can be reached by the A-road network that has a choice of routes through and around the village.

=== Roads ===
The main village thoroughfare is the A245 Cobham Road and is partly bounded by and contains partly in the south the east-west, part-dualled A246.

Local bus operator Falcon Buses provides hourly route 479 between Epsom and Guildford through the village.

=== Rail ===
The Effingham to Leatherhead branch of the New Guildford Line skirts the north of most of the houses in Fetcham, but there is currently no station in the village. There were proposals for a station in the village centre during the 1930s/1940s which would have served the main village centre and been located at what is now Hilley Field Lane. The nearest stations are Leatherhead, Cobham & Stoke D'Abernon and Bookham.

== Emergency services ==
Fetcham is served by the following emergency services:

- Surrey Police
- South East Coast Ambulance Service as of 1 July 2006. The Surrey, Sussex, and Kent Ambulance services have merged, and no longer exist separately.
- Surrey Fire & Rescue Service, Leatherhead Fire Station is in Fetcham, off Guildford Road, close to the River Mole boundary with Leatherhead.
  - Fetcham (Leatherhead) fire station has 28 personnel and one fire engine (water tender ladder). It also has special vehicles, one that is capable of transporting a large quantity of water or foam to an incident (water carrier), and a fire victim support vehicle crewed by the Red Cross.
  - Appliances:
    - 1 x water tender ladder
    - 1 x water carrier

== Demography and housing ==
2011 Census Homes
Ward	Detached	Semi-detached	Terraced	Flats and apartments	Caravans/temporary/mobile homes/houseboats	Shared between households
Fetcham East	852	440	57	159	0	0
Fetcham West	807	615	120	61	1	0

The average level of accommodation in the region composed of detached houses was 28%, the average that was apartments was 22.6%.

2011 Census Households
Ward	Population	Households	% Owned outright	% Owned with a loan	hectares
Fetcham East	3,836	1508	50	36	429
Fetcham West	4160	1604	46	46	543

The proportion of households who owned their home outright compares to the regional average of 35.1%. The proportion who owned their home with a loan compares to the regional average of 32.5%. The remaining % is made up of rented dwellings (plus a negligible % of households living rent-free).

== See also ==
- List of places of worship in Mole Valley

== Notes and references ==
Notes
