= Francis Moon =

English printseller

Sir Francis Moon Bt
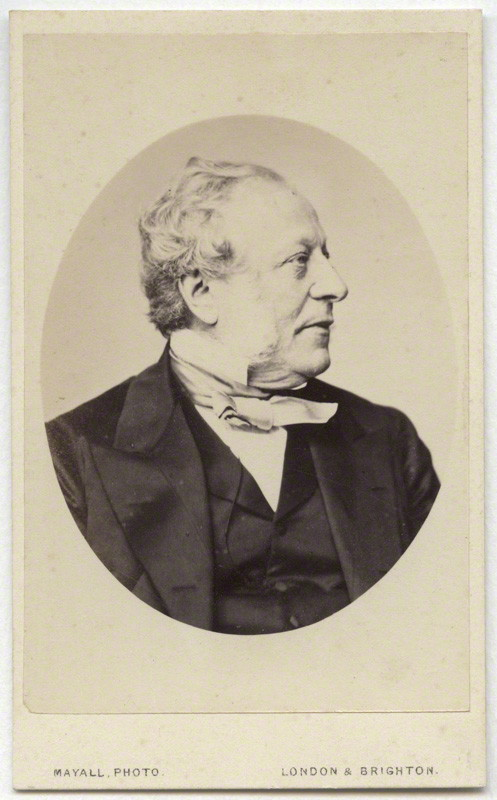

Lord Mayor of London
- In office 1854–1854
- Preceded by: Thomas Sydney
- Succeeded by: David Salomons

Personal details
- Born: 28 October 1796 St Andrew, Holborn
- Died: 13 October 1871 (aged 74) Brighton
- Spouse: Anne Chancellor

Sir Francis Graham Moon, 1st Baronet (28 October 1796 – 13 October 1871) was an English printseller and publisher and served as Lord Mayor of London.

== Life ==
Moon was born at St Andrew, Holborn, the son of Christopher Moon, and Ann, daughter of T. Withry. His father was a gold and silver smith.

The Royal Exchange buildings in 1844

Moon became a print seller and acquired a number of shops at the corner of Finch Street and Threadneedle Street in the 1820s on the site of the Royal Exchange buildings. He was considered to be the leading print publisher in London and was commissioned by artists including David Wilkie and David Roberts.

In 1831, Moon entered the Common Council of the City of London for Bread Street ward and became one of the Sheriffs of the City of London in 1843. He was an alderman for Portsoken from 1844 to 1871 and for Bridge Street Without from 1871. In 1854, he became Lord Mayor of London and showed European leanings as in 1855 he received the French Emperor and Empress in the Guildhall. He was subsequently honoured as a Chevalier de la Légion d'honneur. He was created baronet on 4 May 1855. Moon was master of the Stationers' Company from 1854 to 1855 and Master of the Loriners' Company from 1855 to 1856.

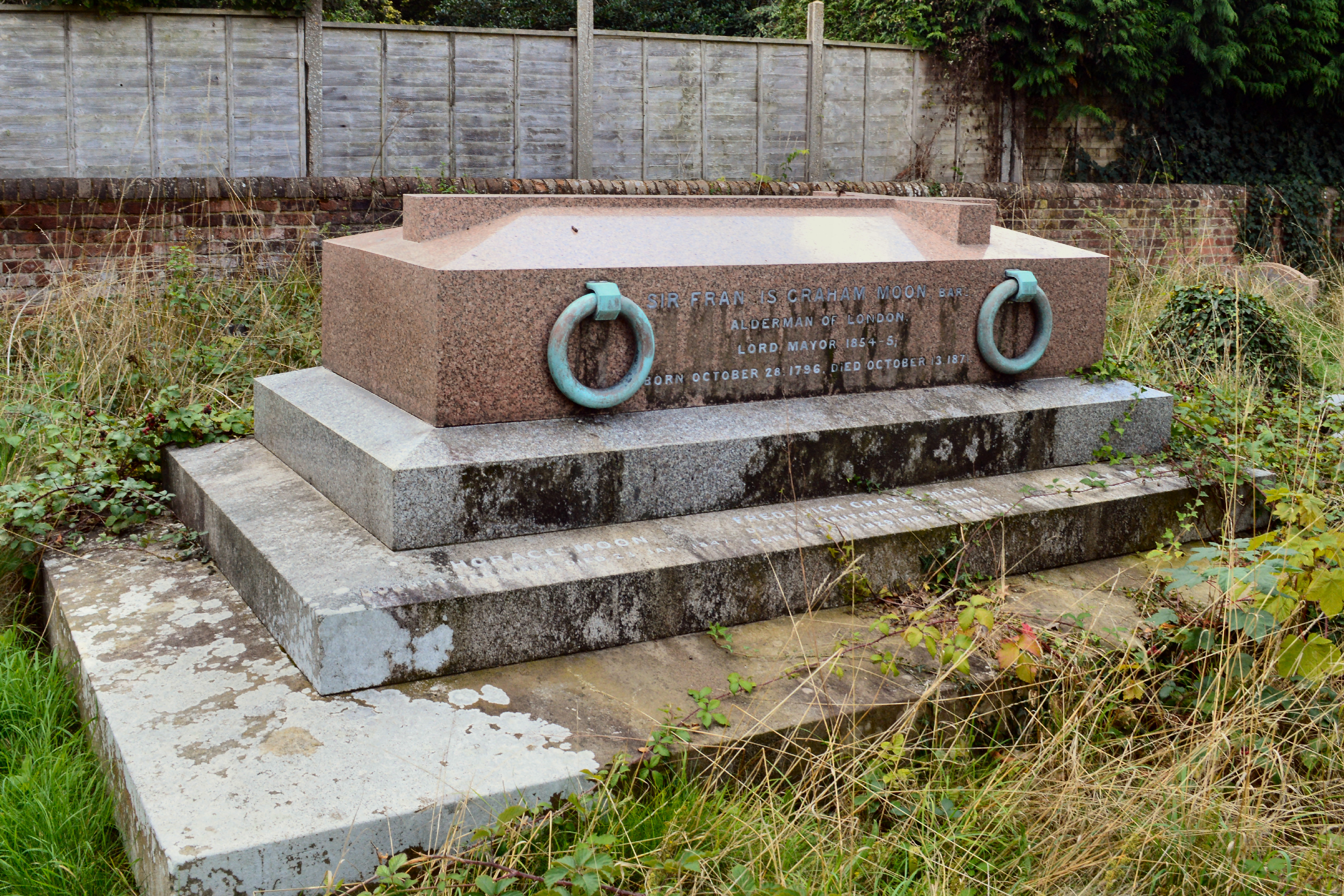
St Mary's Church, Fetcham

Moon died at Western House, Brighton on 13 October 1871, at the age of 74. He was buried in the churchyard of St. Mary's Church, Fetcham, Surrey where his son Edward was rector.

== Family ==
Moon married Anne Chancellor on 28 October 1818, and had four sons and four daughters. His son Edward Graham Moon was a rower and clergyman and succeeded to the baronetcy.

Through his marriage to Anne, Moon was related to the architects Frederic Chancellor and F. G. M. Chancellor.

== Notes ==
Civic offices
Preceded by Thomas Sidney	Lord Mayor of the City of London; 1854	Succeeded by David Salomons
Baronetage of the United Kingdom
New creation	Baronet (of Portman Square); 1855–1871	Succeeded by Edward Graham Moon
