= Cecil Moon =

English cricketer

Sir Cecil Moon Bt
Personal information
- Full name: Cecil Ernest Moon
- Born: 2 September 1867; Watford, Hertfordshire, England
- Died: 22 February 1951 (aged 83); Buxton, Derbyshire, England
- Batting: Unknown
- Relatives: Benjamin Darbyshire (uncle); Richard Moon (grandfather)

Domestic team information
- Years: Team
- 1900: London County

Career statistics
Competition	First-class
Matches	1
Runs scored	29
Batting average	14.50
100s/50s	–/–
Top score	17
Catches/stumpings	–/–
- Source: Cricinfo, 30 December 2011

Sir Cecil Ernest Moon, 2nd Baronet (2 September 1867 – 22 February 1951) was an English first-class cricketer.

The son of Edward Moon, he was born at Watford in September 1867. He was educated at Uppingham School, before going up to the University of Giessen in Germany. Moon succeeded his grandfather as the 2nd Baronet of the Moon baronets upon his death in November 1899; the baronetage had been created for his grandfather, Sir Richard Moon, in 1887.

He played first-class cricket in 1900 for London County, under the captaincy of W. G. Grace, making a single appearance against Derbyshire at Derby. Batting twice in the match, he was dismissed for 17 runs in the London County first innings by Harry Bagshaw, while in their second innings he was dismissed for 12 runs by John Hulme.

Shortly after, he emigrated to the United States, where he married an Irish immigrant named Kate Lawder, with the couple running a ranch near Fort Collins, Colorado. They divorced in 1909, with him later returning to England.

Moon died, without issue, at Buxton in February 1951. He was succeeded as the 3rd Baronet by his nephew, Sir Richard Moon. His uncle, Benjamin Darbyshire, was also a first-class cricketer.

Baronetage of England
Preceded by Sir Richard Moon	Baronet (of Copsewood Grange); 1899–1951	Succeeded by Sir Richard Moon
