= Sussex Ambulance Service =

- Established: 1 April 1995
- Disbanded: 1 July 2006
- Headquarters: Ambulance Headquarters, Southfields Road, Eastbourne, East Sussex BN21 1BZ
- Region served: Sussex

Sussex Ambulance Service was the ambulance service for the County of Sussex in England from 1 April 1995 until 1 July 2006, when it was succeeded by a South East Coast Ambulance Service also covering Surrey and Kent.

The trust provided ambulance services to a population of 1.5 million people, and was formed by the merger of the East and West Sussex ambulance services. In 2001, plans were announced for a merger with Kent Ambulance Service, but these were shelved six months later after local resistance was encountered.

A Commission for Health Improvement (CHI) began a clinical governance review of the trust in 2002. Its report in 2003 criticised managerial staff at the trust for having inadequate systems to communicate with staff. In 2005, it emerged that the trust’s despatch system had suffered computer failure four times over a period of a few months.

The service started to use thrombolysis for suspected heart attacks in October 2003; by 2005 they had treated their 50th patient with this.

The service had established a community first responder scheme by 2006.

In 2000, the trust had an agreement with the Gambian Government to provide training to some African emergency service workers. Over a period of a few years, a small number of students travelled from The Gambia to Sussex to be trained to the level of ambulance technician.

== See also ==
- Emergency medical services in the United Kingdom
