= Oxford Playhouse =

Theatre in Oxford, England

- the Playhouse
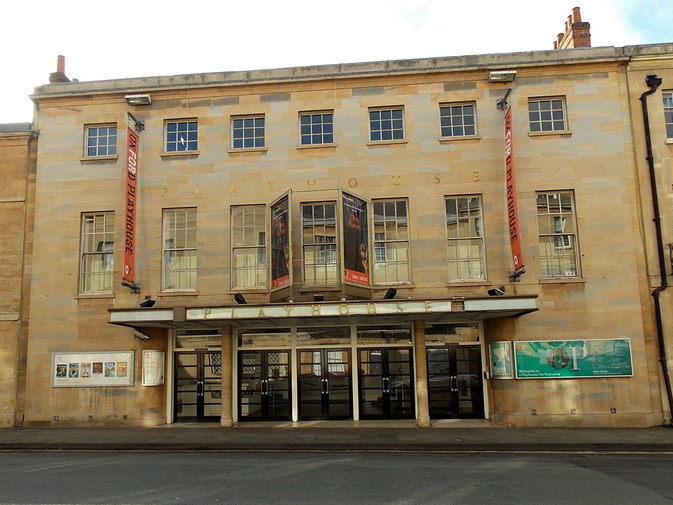
- The theatre entrance on Beaumont Street.
- Interactive map of Oxford Playhouse
- Address: Beaumont Street
- Location: Oxford
- Coordinates: 51°45′17″N 1°15′39″W
- Owner: St John's College
- Operator: The Oxford Playhouse Trust
- Capacity: 663
- Type: Theatre
- Public transit: Gloucester Green, Oxford railway station

Construction
- Built: 1938
- Architects: Edward Maufe (exterior); F. G. M. Chancellor (interior)

Website
- www.oxfordplayhouse.com

Listed Building – Grade II*
- Official name: The Playhouse
- Designated: 12 January 1954
- Reference no.: 1185150

The Oxford Playhouse is a live theatre venue designed by Edward Maufe and F. G. M. Chancellor. It is situated in Beaumont Street, Oxford, opposite the Ashmolean Museum.

== History ==
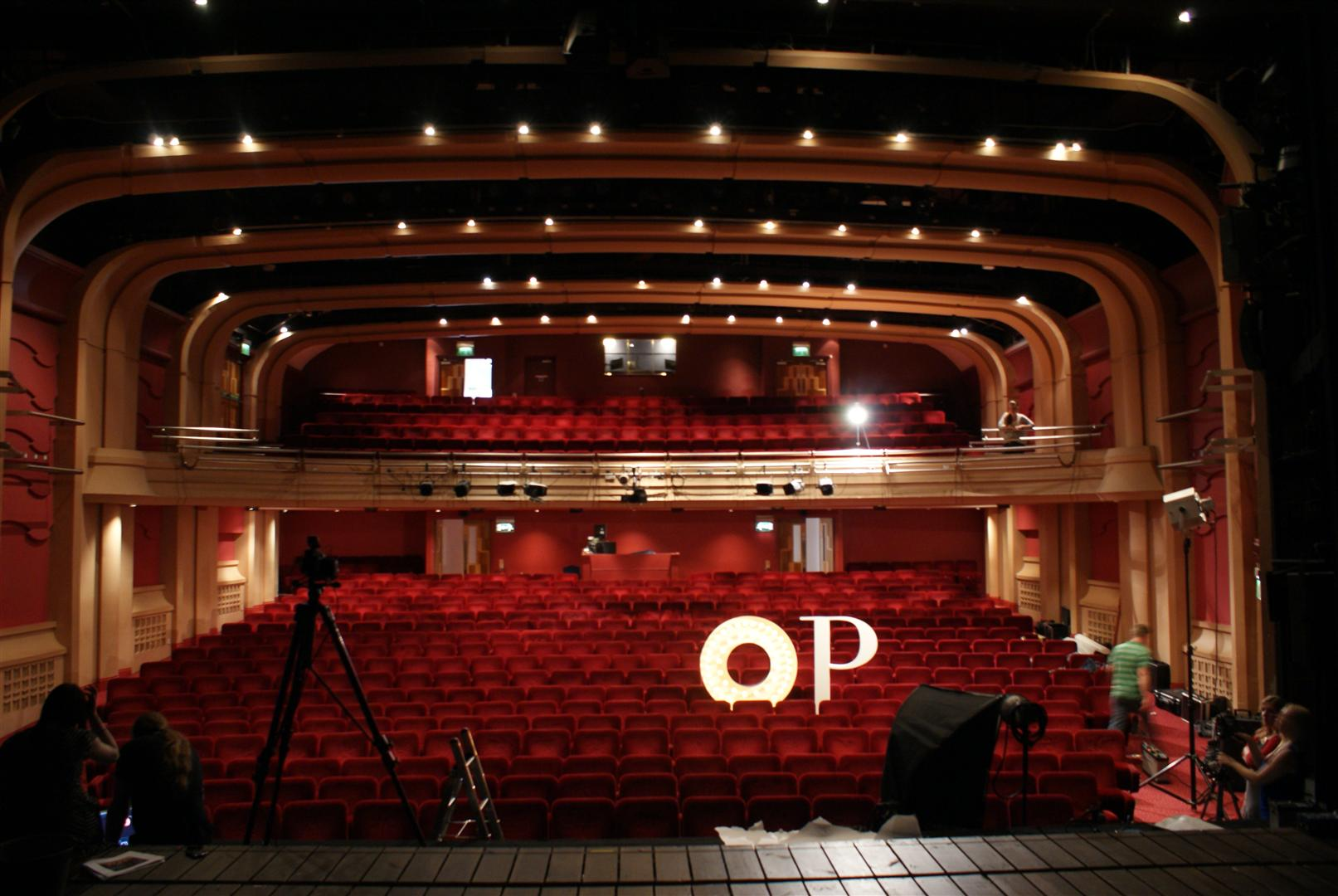
Inside the auditorium

The Playhouse was founded as The Red Barn at 12 Woodstock Road, North Oxford, in 1923 by J. B. Fagan. The early history of the theatre is documented by the theatre director, Norman Marshall in his 1947 book, The Other Theatre. Don Chapman also provided a comprehensive study of the theatre in the 2008 book, Oxford Playhouse: High and Low Drama in a University City.

The exterior design of the theatre building on the south side of Beaumont Street was by Sir Edward Maufe, with the interior design by F.G.M. Chancellor; the building was completed in 1938. It is faced with stone, in keeping with the early 19th century Regency buildings in the street.

Actors who have appeared on the stage at the Playhouse include Rowan Atkinson, Ronnie Barker, Dirk Bogarde, Judi Dench, John Gielgud, Ian McDiarmid, Ian McKellen, Dudley Moore, and Maggie Smith. Susannah York gave her final stage performance there in August 2010, in Ronald Harwood's Quartet. The journalist and writer Christopher Hitchens worked as a stagehand at the Playhouse during his time as an undergraduate at Balliol College, Oxford.

The Oxford Playhouse was the base from which Prospect Theatre Company was created by manager Elizabeth Sweeting and resident stage manager Iain Mackintosh in 1961. Between 1963 and 1976, the Prospect Theatre Company toured 75 productions to 125 theatres in 21 countries.

The Greek theatre director Minos Volanakis was an associate director at the Playhouse; his productions included Jean Genet's The Maids (1963–4) and The Balcony (1967), and Jean Giraudoux's Madwoman of Chaillot.

== Present ==
A charitable trust runs the Playhouse as a theatre for the local community, through a professional management and direction team. The freehold of the building is owned by St John's College. The theatre was closed for some years for lack of funding, but is now refurbished with a 663-seat capacity in the main auditorium.

=== Burton Taylor Studio ===
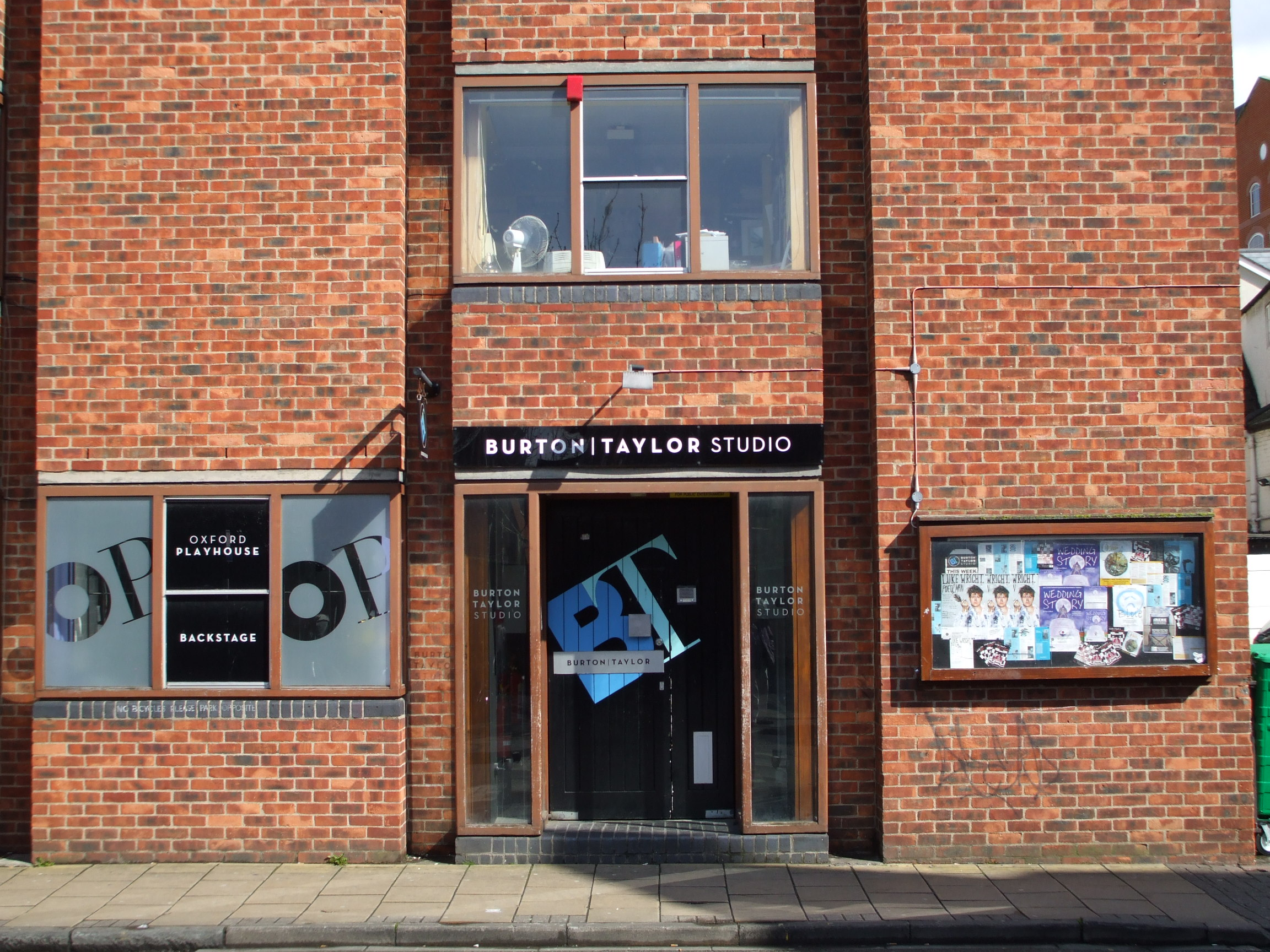
The entrance to the Burton Taylor Studio theatre

Oxford Playhouse has close relations with the University of Oxford and is the home stage of the Oxford University Dramatic Society. On behalf of the university the Playhouse also manages the nearby Burton Taylor Studio, named in honour of Richard Burton and Elizabeth Taylor. "The BT" is a 50-seat studio theatre in Gloucester Street, close to the Oxford Playhouse. It originated in 1966, when Richard Burton donated money towards the creation of a rehearsal space, also occasionally used for performance, named the Burton Rooms.

A couple of decades later, students from the Oxford University Dramatic Society (OUDS) established the current tradition of the venue as a home for regular student productions. The Burton Taylor Studio programmes a mix of student and professional productions throughout the year.

== See also ==
- Michael Pilch Studio
- New Theatre Oxford
- Old Fire Station Theatre

== Sources ==
- Anonymous (20 November 1999). "Minos Volanakis, Greek Translator And Director, 74". The New York Times.
- Chapman, Don (2008). Oxford Playhouse: High and Low Drama in a University City. Society for Theatre Research, University of Hertfordshire Press. ISBN 978-1-902806-86-0. OL 22345509M.
- Marshall, Norman. 1947. The Other Theatre. London: John Lehmann.
- Parkinson, David. 2003. Oxford at the Movies. P.Ink Books.
