= William Maule (rower) =

English clergyman and rower

William Maule (1824 – 16 May 1898) was an English clergyman and rower who won the Diamond Challenge Sculls at Henley Royal Regatta in 1847.

Maule was born in London, the third son of George Maule, Treasury Solicitor. He was educated at Winchester College and Trinity College, Cambridge. He was president of Cambridge University Boat Club and in 1847 rowed bow against Oxford in the Grand Challenge Cup at Henley in a year when there was no official Boat Race. He also won the Diamond Challenge Sculls at Henley in 1847, beating the previous year's winner Edward Moon. Moon had the compensation of being bow opposite Maule in the winning Oxford boat in the Grand Challenge Cup that year.

Maule was ordained deacon (Ely) in 1849 and priest in 1850. He was curate of Fletton, Huntingdonshire from 1849 to 1850 and of Church Crookham, Hampshire from 1850 to 1851. In 1851 he became rector of Eynesbury, Huntingdonshire and was Rural Dean of St Neots from 1876 to 1889. In 1890 he became vicar of Privett, Hampshire until his death there at the age of 74.

Maule married Cecil Vardon, youngest daughter of Thomas Vardon on 17 July 1851.
