= Benjamin Darbyshire =

English cricketer

Personal information
- Full name: Benjamin Stewart Darbyshire
- Born: 13 June 1845; West Derby, (Liverpool), Lancashire, England
- Died: 18 January 1907 (aged 61); Birkdale, Lancashire, England
- Batting: Unknown
- Bowling: Unknown
- Relatives: Cecil Moon (nephew)

Domestic team information
- Years: Team
- 1864–1866: Oxford University

Career statistics
Competition	First-class
Matches	2
Runs scored	4
Batting average	2.00
100s/50s	–/–
Top score	4
Balls bowled	47
Wickets	8
Bowling average	3.00
5 wickets in innings	1
10 wickets in match	–
Best bowling	5/?
Catches/stumpings	–/–
- Source: Cricinfo, 24 February 2020

Benjamin Stewart Darbyshire (13 June 1845 – 18 January 1907) was an English first-class cricketer and clergyman.

The son of Benjamin Darbyshire senior, he was born in June 1845 in West Derby, Lancashire (now Liverpool). He later studied at Wadham College at the University of Oxford. While studying at Oxford, he made two appearances in first-class cricket for Oxford University against the Marylebone Cricket Club in 1864 and 66, with both matches played at Oxford. In the 1864 fixture, he took a five wicket haul. After graduating from Oxford, Darbyshire took holy orders in the Church of England. He was the canon of St Paul's Church, Sheffield from 1868–70, before assuming the post of vicar for Blundellsands from 1870. In 1879, he was made a temporary chaplain in the 36th West Riding of Yorkshire Corps. Darbyshire died in January 1907 at Birkdale, Lancashire. His nephew, Cecil Moon, also played first-class cricket.
