= Frederic Chancellor =

English architect (1873–1958)

Frederic Chancellor RA FRIBA
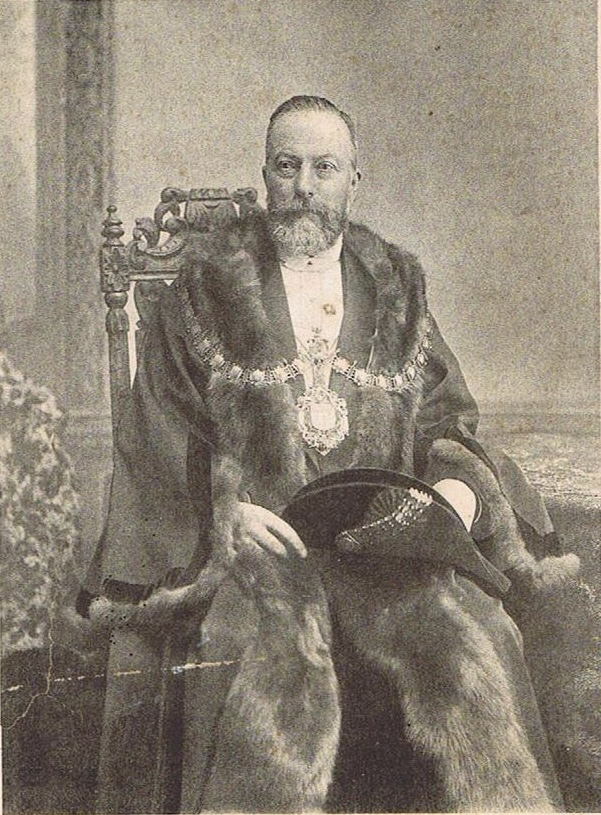
- Chancellor, c. 1889
- Born: 27 April 1825; Chelsea, London
- Died: 3 January 1918 (aged 92); Chelmsford, Essex
- Occupation: Architect
- Practice: Chancellor & Son of Chelmsford

Frederic Chancellor RA, FRIBA, JP (27 April 1825 – 3 January 1918) was an English architect and surveyor who spent much of his career working in Chelmsford, Essex, and its surrounding areas. His works included private houses, municipal buildings, churches, parsonages, banks and schools. It was during his later career that he concentrated on ecclesiastical buildings for which he became best known. A prolific architect, around 730 buildings have been attributed to him, 570 of which being in Essex.

Chancellor was the Mayor of Chelmsford on six occasions between 1888 until 1906. He held senior posts in Chelmsford Town and Essex County councils and was elected as a freeman of the city in 1917. He retired that year and died at his home in Chelmsford in 1918.

== Early life ==
Chancellor was born on 13 April 1825 in Chelsea, London. He was the third eldest of 11 children born to John Chancellor (1794–1876), a coach builder, and his wife, Rebecca née Wilmott (1797–1869). Frederic's baptism was one of the first to take place at the newly built St Luke's Church, Chelsea, on 18 May 1825. He began his architectural career in 1846 working for the Chelmsford-based practice of James Beadel & Son for whom he designed farm buildings, including those at Stevens Farm in Chignall for the Chelmsford farmer, James Crush. In 1854 Chancellor won a competition to design a new school in Felsted, which brought him to the wider attention of his peers. The following year, under Beadel & Son, he completed the designs for one of his earliest surviving buildings, the lodge within the grounds of Chelmsford's Quaker Burial Ground. Chancellor set up his own offices in London and Chelmsford in 1860; one of his earliest clients was the London and County Bank for whom he designed properties at 32 and 34 Borough High Street, Southwark, in 1862; 58 High Street, Tenterden, Kent (1866); 3 London Street, Basingstoke (1866); and 49 Broadway, Stratford, in 1867.

== Career ==
Chancellor was a prolific architect; as of 2002 some 730 buildings have been attributed to him, with 570 of these being in Essex. He was as frequent with his ecclesiastical designs as he was with his domestic work, the latter of which include Pontlands Park, Great Baddow and the restorations of Durwards Hall (now Kelvedon Park), Layer Marney Tower, and Leez Priory.

Chancellor undertook the remodelling of the house and grounds of Poulett Lodge, Twickenham, in the Italianate style, for William Punchard. The main house was demolished in the 1930s and the area was redeveloped into flats, known as Thames Eyot. The grounds were re-planned and replanted in 1962; of Chancellors work to survive includes the boathouse, deep-water dock, riverside landing stage, steps, balustrade, gates and loggia.

In 1867 Chancellor designed the current building for Felsted School, including the adjoining School Master's House, in Felsted, Essex.

It was during his later career that Chancellor concentrated on churches, working on the designs and refurbishments of over 90 religious buildings. The Church of Holy Trinity, in Pleshey, was redesigned by Chancellor and built in 1868, with only the medieval crossing arches surviving from the earlier building. Historic England called the rebuild "handsome" which was conducted in a "boldly picturesque manner".

The Church of St John the Evangelist, Ford End, which Chancellor designed in 1870, was another to be singled out by for its picturesque qualities. Completed in the Early English style of the 13th century, the building suffered many faults and had to be partially demolished and rebuilt, by Alfred Young Nutt in 1892 because of subsidence. From then on, much underpinning work took place and the chancel was demolished completely in 1984. Despite this, it is considered it to be "one of Chancellor's most original churches". Chancellor also conducted substantial alterations and additions on the nearby Norman church, St Mary and St Lawrence, including the construction of the North aisle and vestry, rebuilding the chancel arch and south porch and some alterations to the tower.

In 1878 Chancellor designed a new church for Creeksea, Essex. The Church of All Saints was built on the site of a former building that was erected in the 14th century. Historic England, who listed Chancellor's building at Grade II in 1951, noted the architect's "sensitivity" when redesigning the church and his reuse of existing materials in order to recreate the spirit of the earlier church, a sentiment shared by the architectural historian Nikolaus Pevsner in the Essex edition of The Buildings of England.

Another of Chancellor's churches singled out by Pevsner for its picturesque qualities was St. Lawrence and All Saints in the parish of Steeple, Essex. Like his church at Creeksea, Chancellor re-used materials from the demolished former church of the 14th century. The foundation stone was under laid by Susanna Claughton, wife of the Bishop of St. Albans on 13 August 1883.

From 1859, for a period of about 10 years, the architect George Campbell Sherrin was an assistant to Chancellor before establishing his own successful architectural practice in 1877. Sherrin would go on to design, among others, Old Spitalfields Market and Southend Kursaal, and have a long association with the Metropolitan Railway as a consultant, designing a number of important stations.

Chancellor's son, Frederick Wykeham, was articled to his father from 1885 to 1889, remaining as his assistant in the practice until 1893.

== Later years and civic duties ==
From 1888, Chancellor became Mayor of Chelmsford for the first time, a post to which he was elected on six further occasions until 1906. He held senior posts in Chelmsford Town and Essex County councils and was elected as a freeman of the city in 1917.

By 1903 Chancellor and Sons had been appointed architects and surveyors to the trustees of the Upminster Hall Estate, Upminster. In 1904 the office drew up a survey plan and forwarded it to Sir Charles Reilly, the chosen architect of the owner of Upminster Hall, Arthur E Williams. The building now exists as Upminster Court.

== Personal life ==
Chancellor was married twice, firstly to Harriet née Allen (b.1826–d.1900), with whom he had 5 children, including the architect Frederic Wykeham Chancellor (1865-1945). Chancellor Jr became articled to his father in 1885 until 1893 when he became a partner in his father's business. Frederic the elder's second marriage was to Emma née Wenley, in 1903, at Christ Church in Lancaster Gate, Westminster, London.

Chancellor's paternal uncle was the publisher and Lord Mayor of London, Francis Moon. Chancellor's cousins were the Tasmanian born architect Francis Graham Moon Chancellor (1869—1940), and the Australian cricketer Frederick Chancellor (1878–1939).

== Retirement and death ==
Chancellor retired from his civic duties in November 1917 because of poor health and died at his Chelmsford home, "Bellefield", in January the following year. His funeral took place at Chelmsford Cathedral on 8 February 1918 and he was interred in the neighbouring cemetery in Rectory Lane.

His name is commemorated in the Frederic Chancellor Building which was built in 1904–05 as a museum and art school.

== Sources ==
- Bettley, James; Pevsner, Nikolaus (2007). Essex. The Buildings of England. New Haven, US and London: Yale University Press. ISBN 978-0-300-11614-4. OCLC 0300116144.
- Bradley, Enid; Pevsner, Nikolaus (2002). Essex. The Buildings of England. New Haven, US and London: Yale University Press. ISBN 978-0-300-09601-9. OCLC 49299203.
- Wilmore, David (2008). Frank Matcham & Co. South Yorkshire: Theatreshire Books. ISBN 978-0-95341-271-6. OCLC 800880206.
