= F. G. M. Chancellor =

Australian architect

Francis Graham Moon Chancellor (30 September 1869 – 20 September 1940), styled professionally as F. G. M. Chancellor, was a Tasmanian architect and designer, based in London. He built a reputation as a competent architect, coming to the notice of Frank Matcham, with whom he worked for around 13 years. When Matcham retired in 1913, Chancellor took over the running of Matcham & Co., and successfully transitioned the company from being one that built theatres to constructing modern cinemas. His works include the renovations of The Old Vic in Waterloo, London, between 1922 and 1929; the new Sadler's Wells Theatre in Clerkenwell (1926–31); and a series of super cinemas, the most notable of which being the State Cinema in Grays, Essex, which opened in 1938.

Chancellor retired shortly before 1939 and died at his Buckinghamshire home in 1940.

== Biography ==
=== Early years ===
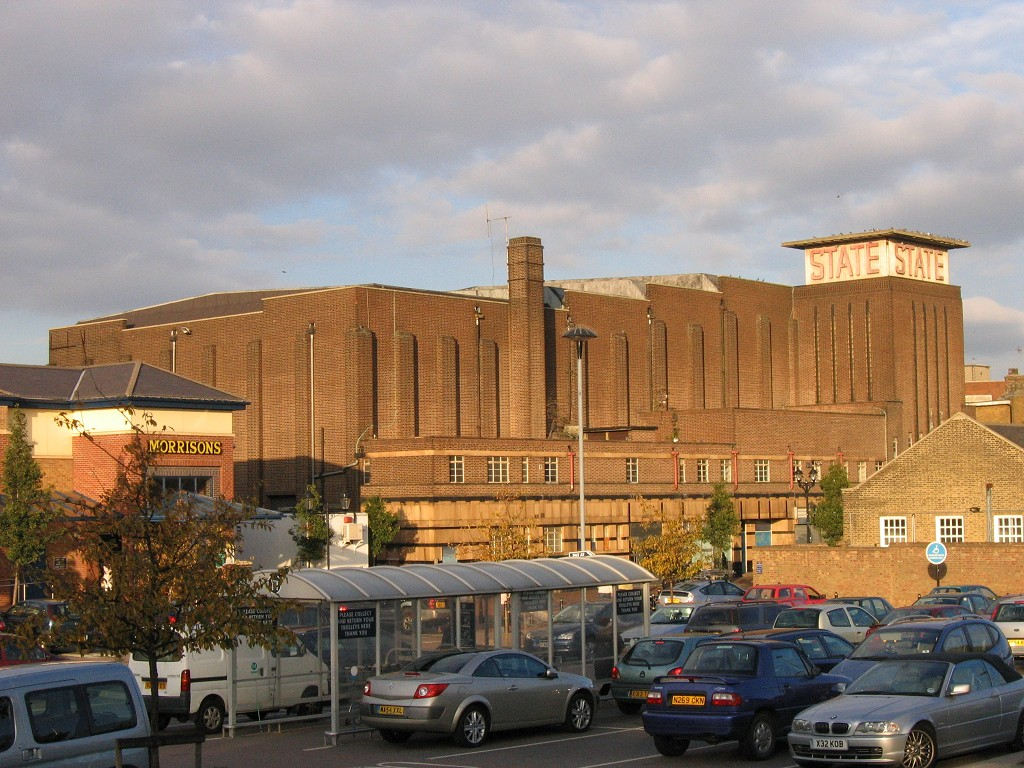
The State Cinema, Grays, Essex

Francis Graham Moon Chancellor was born on 30 September 1869 in Runnymede, Tasmania. He was one of 10 children, and the fourth eldest son to Edward Chancellor (1824–1893) and his wife, Elizabeth née Morgan. Francis's great uncle was the publisher and former Lord Mayor of London, Francis Moon; his cousin was the English architect Frederic Chancellor. Francis Chancellor was educated at Christ College, Hobart, before commencing training as an architect in Tasmania. Soon after the death of his father in 1893, he boarded the RMS Oroya from Sydney to London, arriving on 30 May 1894.

=== Works ===
The theatre architect Frank Matcham designed some of London's best known theatres, including the Hippodrome (1900), Hackney Empire (1901), Coliseum (1903), Palladium (1910), and the Victoria Palace Theatre in 1911. In 1913 he retired and entrusted his company, Matcham & Co., in part, to Chancellor. Upon Matcham's death in 1921, Chancellor was appointed to act as co-executor of Matcham's will, alongside one of Matcham's most trusted collaborators, Felix De Jong.

Chancellor divided his time between 1922 and 1924 on the designs for the MGM Cinema in Magdalen Street, Oxford, alongside J. C. Leeds, and the first phase of reconstructions at The Old Vic in Waterloo, returning in 1927 to 1929. Around that time, using materials from the previous building, he designed the new Sadler's Wells Theatre, Islington, which opened in 1930.

By the 1930s, with the emergence of cinema, tastes had changed with audiences; theatres had become old fashioned so Chancellor modernised Matcham & Co's., business model by concentrating on cinema design. The most notable of Chancellor's cinemas is the State in Grays, Essex, which opened in 1938. This was the second of two cinemas he built in the town, the former being the Regal, which had opened eight years previously. The State survives and was designated as a Grade II* listed building in 1985; the Regal was demolished in 1971. Also in 1938, he collaborated with Edward Maufe on the designs for the Playhouse in Oxford.

=== Later years ===
Upon the outbreak of the Second World War, Chancellor retired to the countryside, and left the running of Matcham & Co to his assistant, S. W. Chappell.

Chancellor died at his home, "Southcote", Marsham Way, Gerrards Cross, Buckinghamshire, on 20 September 1940, aged 70. He left an estate worth £28,629 (£1,970,000 in 2023 adjusted for inflation).

Matcham & Co., was held in a dormant state until after the war when it was sold to a property agency in Covent Garden. It continued, albeit on a smaller scale, until it was eventually wound up in the late 1970s.

== Sources ==
- Chapman, Don (2008). Oxford Playhouse: High and low drama in a university city. Hertfordshire: University of Hertfordshire Press. ISBN 978-1-902806-86-0.
- Earl, John (2005). British Theatres and Music Halls. Princes Risborough: Shire Publications. ISBN 978-0-74780-627-1.
- Wilmore, David (2008). Frank Matcham & Co. South Yorkshire: Theatreshire Books. ISBN 978-0-95341-271-6.
