= Surrey Ambulance Service =

Former ambulance service in England

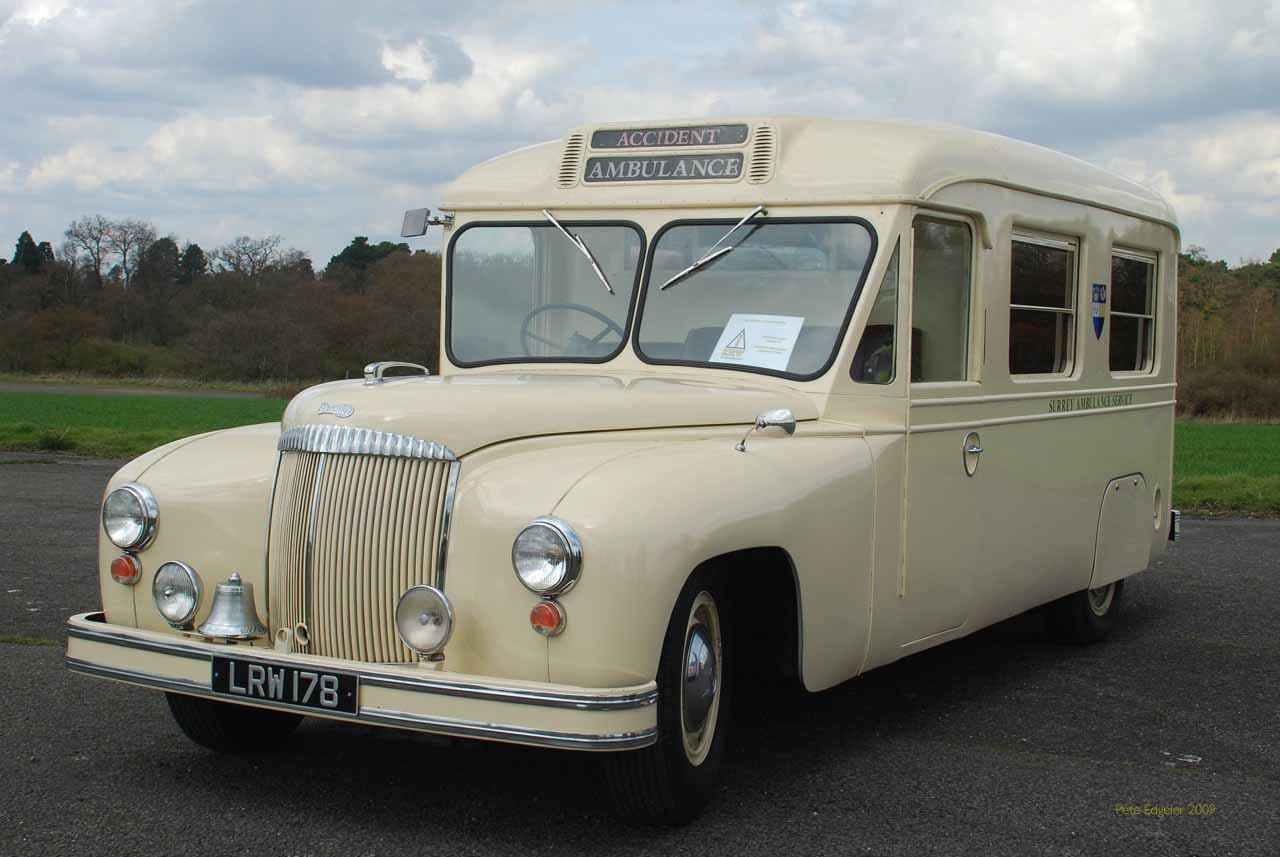
A Barker-bodied Daimler DC 27 ambulance in Surrey Ambulance Service livery

Surrey Ambulance Service (SAS) was the ambulance service for the County of Surrey in England. It was formed in 1948 and became part of South East Coast Ambulance Service on 1 July 2006.

== History ==
Surrey Ambulance Service (SAS) was founded in 1948 and was initially run by the county council. On its formation, the service ran 48 ambulance stations, 16 of which were staffed on a part-time basis. The headquarters were originally at New Malden, but moved to Banstead in November 1964, in advance of the creation of Greater London. On 1 April 1965, SAS ceased to provide ambulance services to the new London Boroughs of Croydon, Kingston, Merton, Sutton and Richmond. On the same date, SAS began providing ambulance services to Staines and Sunbury-on-Thames Urban Districts, which had previously been part of Middlesex.

In 1974, responsibility for SAS passed to East Surrey Health Authority. In January 1988, the service took over operations in northeast Hampshire, including the Farnborough ambulance station in Hawley Lane. By expanding its operations into the neighbouring county, it became the sole ambulance operator for Frimley Park Hospital.

A new £1M control centre opened at The Horseshoe, Banstead on 11 January 1991. In 1992, Surrey Ambulance Service was managed by East Surrey Health Authority as part of the National Health Service (NHS) and operated 17 ambulance stations. It served an area of around 700 sq mi (1,800 km^{2}) in Surrey and northeast Hampshire.

Authorisation to become a self-governing NHS trust was granted in February 1994 and took effect that April. In December 2000, SAS served 1.1 million residents from 19 stations across Surrey and north-east Hampshire. It also provided ambulance services for Gatwick Airport.

On 1 July 2006, SAS merged with neighbouring services in Sussex and Kent to form South East Coast Ambulance Service. The Banstead centre was the headquarters for the combined organisation until mid-2018.

== Fleet ==
In 1998, the majority of the emergency ambulances operated by SAS were derivatives of the Ford Transit with 2.9-litre Cologne V6 petrol engines and automatic transmission. In 1999, eight new ambulances, based on the Chevrolet 3500 chassis-cab with 5.6-litre V8 petrol engines, were acquired.

== See also ==
- Emergency medical services in the United Kingdom
