= South East Coast Ambulance Service =

Provider of ambulance services for south-eastern England

South East Coast Ambulance Service NHS Foundation Trust

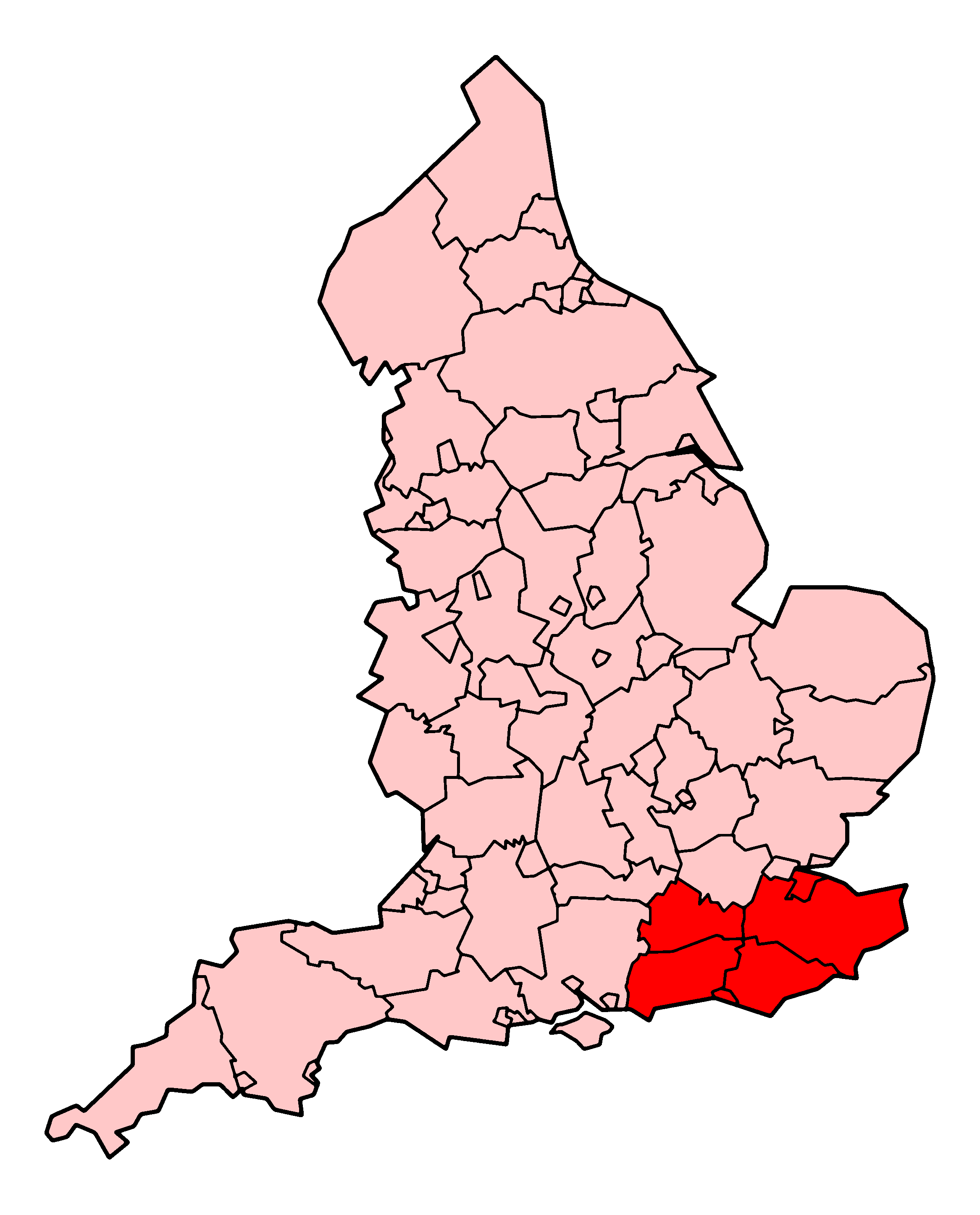
- The area served by the South East Coast Ambulance Service
- Type: NHS foundation trust
- Established: 1 July 2006
- Headquarters: Crawley, West Sussex, England
- Region served: East Sussex; Hampshire (part); Kent; Surrey; West Sussex
- Chair: Colin Dennis
- Chief executive: Jennifer Allan (Interim)
- Staff: 5,136 (2024/25)
- Website: www.secamb.nhs.uk

The South East Coast Ambulance Service NHS Foundation Trust (SECAmb) is the NHS ambulance services trust for south-eastern England, covering Kent (including Medway), Surrey, West Sussex and East Sussex (including Brighton and Hove). It also covers a part of north-eastern Hampshire around Aldershot, Farnborough, Fleet and Yateley. The service was made an NHS foundation trust on 1 March 2011.

It is one of ten ambulance services trusts providing England with emergency medical services, and is part of the National Health Service, receiving direct government funding for its role.

The service came into being on 1 July 2006, with the merger of the former Kent Ambulance Service, Surrey Ambulance Service and Sussex Ambulance Service.

== Operations ==
The trust responds to 999 calls from the public and urgent calls from health professionals: in Kent and Sussex, it also provides non-emergency patient transport services (pre-booked patient journeys to and from health care facilities). In addition, the trust provides the crews and maintains the three ambulances of the Neonatal Transfer Service for Kent, Surrey and Sussex.

It serves a population of around 4.5 million. During the financial year (2005–2006) the three predecessor Trusts responded to about 460,000 emergency calls.

It provided paramedics to GP practices across the southeast to take on home visits for a pilot scheme until March 2017, when the scheme was suspended because of a shortage of paramedics.

== Performance ==
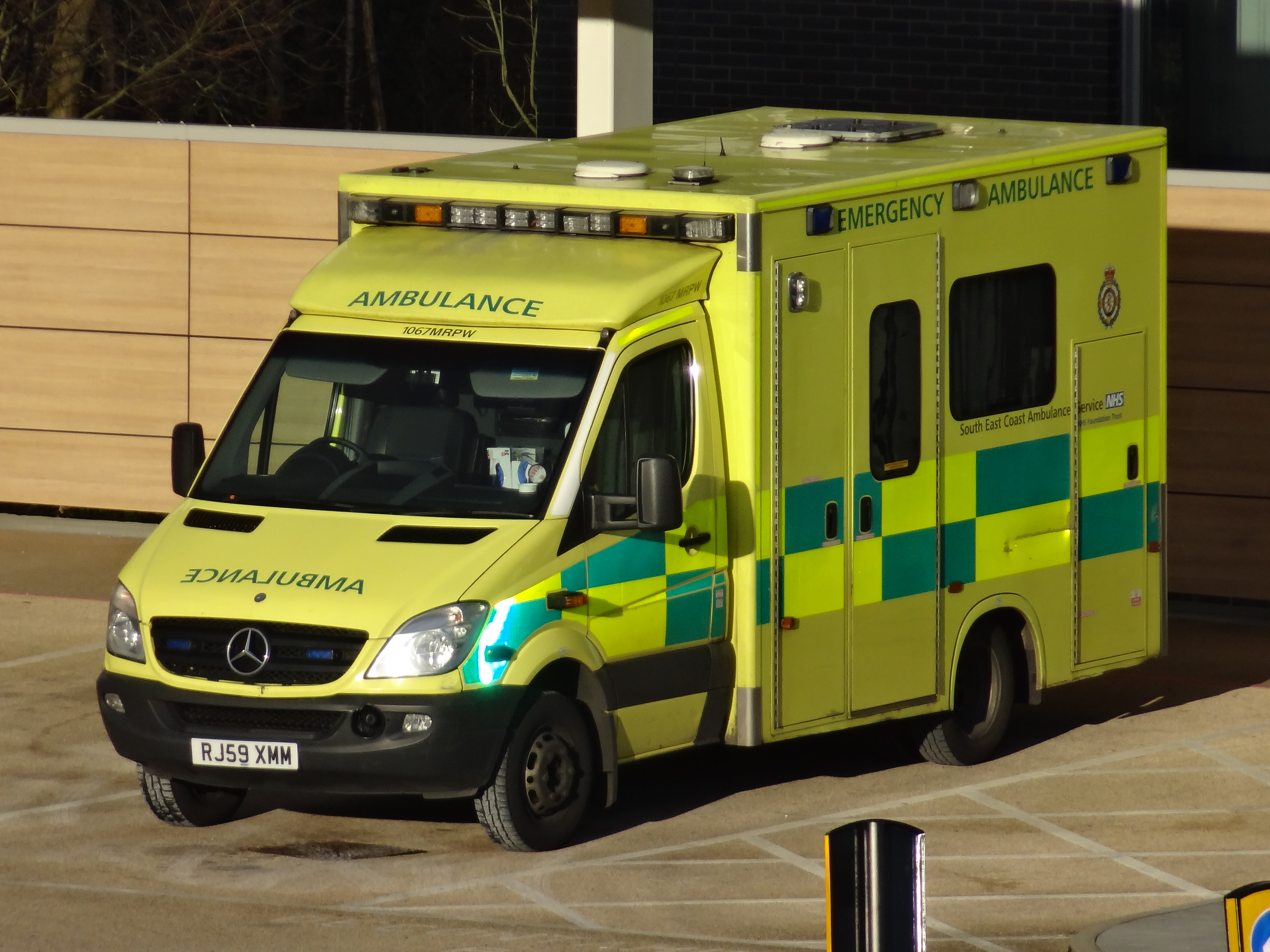
An ambulance in Kent

In January 2015, it was reported that the trust had told paramedics to leave patients at A&E departments if they had not been admitted within 45 minutes of arrival. In March 2015, the trust's "immediate handover policy" which was invoked on 10 February 2015 for an hour (before being rescinded) was condemned by clinicians at Brighton and Sussex University Hospitals NHS Trust as "unsafe and likely to pose a notable increase to risk for patients in the emergency department".

In November 2015, it emerged that the trust had set up a project which ran from December 2014 to February 2015, where calls were transferred from the NHS 111 system and an additional ten minutes was allocated to the response time, which is part of the nationally agreed operating standards. This delayed the dispatch of ambulances to up to 20,000 patients. It was condemned by NHS England for putting the "public at risk" because there was "no evaluation built into its design".

It was put into special measures in September 2016 after the Care Quality Commission rated it inadequate because of bullying, delayed response times and putting patients at risk. A report produced by Professor Duncan Lewis from Plymouth University in August 2017 described a culture of bullying, harassment and sexual predation.

SECAmb was under severe financial pressure and faced a £7.1 million deficit. Ambulance crews in the area would no longer be paid to interrupt meal breaks and attend to some types of emergencies. Patients with breathing problems, car crash victims, patients with chest pains, seizures or strokes, among others, faced delayed response times. Critics feared this would put lives at risk and worsen outcomes for some surviving patients. Jon Ashworth blamed government financial pressure on the health service. Critics complained money is prioritised over patient care.

In September 2017, the trust reached just 50.8% of red one calls within the target of eight minutes, and 39.9% of red two calls. This was the lowest ever recorded by an ambulance service since May 2012. There was also a decline in calls being answered within five seconds, from 72.4% in September 2016 to 48.6%.

In May 2018, the trust said it would need 400 more paramedics to meet the new ambulance performance standards. This could cost £20M a year. In October the clinical commissioning groups (CCG) agreed to find an extra £10M a year for more ambulances and more staff, but the service still expected to need private ambulance services and staff overtime to meet its targets.

It was taken out of special measures in August 2019 after favourable inspection reports, particularly that there was now an open culture where patients, families and staff could raise concerns without fear, but it was banned by Ofsted from training new apprentices.

The trust's region is served by Air Ambulance Kent Surrey Sussex.

In October 2025, the trust was the subject of an undercover investigation released by Channel 4. The documentary highlighted the pressures the service is under, leading to longer waits for patients in emergency situations. In a statement, the trust clarified that it was not aware of and did not consent to the production of this documentary.

=== CQC performance rating ===
In its last inspection of the service in July 2022, the Care Quality Commission (CQC) gave the following ratings on a scale of outstanding (the service is performing exceptionally well), good (the service is performing well and meeting our expectations), requires improvement (the service isn't performing as well as it should) and inadequate (the service is performing badly):

Inspection Reports
Area	Rating 2016	Rating 2017	Rating 2018	Rating 2019	Rating 2022
Are services safe?	Inadequate	Inadequate	Requires improvement	Good	Requires improvement
Are services effective?	Requires improvement	Requires improvement	Requires improvement	Good	Requires improvement
Are services caring?	Good	Good	Good	Good	Good
Are services responsive?	Requires improvement	Requires improvement	Requires improvement	Good	Requires improvement
Are services well-led?	Inadequate	Inadequate	Requires improvement	Good	Inadequate
Overall rating	Inadequate	Inadequate	Requires improvement	Good	Requires improvement

== See also ==
- South Central Ambulance Service, which serves the rest of Hampshire
- Air Ambulance Kent Surrey Sussex
