= Moon baronets =

Set index for Moon baronets

There have been two baronetcies created for persons with the surname Moon, both in the Baronetage of the United Kingdom. As of 2026 one is extant.

- Moon baronets of Portman Square (1855): see Graham-Moon baronets
- Moon baronets of Copsewood Grange (1887)
