= Kent Ambulance Service =

Kent Ambulance Service was the ambulance service for the county of Kent in England until 1 July 2006, when it was succeeded by a South East Coast Ambulance Service also covering Surrey and Sussex.

== See also ==
- Emergency medical services in the United Kingdom
