= Grade I and II* listed buildings in the London Borough of Sutton =

There are over 9,000 Grade I listed buildings and 20,000 Grade II* listed buildings in England. This page is a list of these buildings in the London Borough of Sutton.

== Grade I ==
Name	Location	Type	Completed (Note: The date given is the date used by Historic England as significant for the initial building or that of an important part in the structure's description.)	Date designated	Grid ref. (Note: The grid reference is based on the British national grid reference system, sometimes known as OSGB36, used by the Ordnance Survey.) Geo-coordinates	Entry number (Note: The "List Entry Number" is a unique number assigned to each listed building and scheduled monument by Historic England.)	Image
Beddington Place (Great Hall only)	Beddington, Sutton	Bell Tower	1550	21 January 1954	TQ2962165302; 51°22′19″N 0°08′21″W	1065672	Beddington Place (Great Hall only) More images

== Grade II* ==
Name	Location	Type	Completed	Date designated	Grid ref. Geo-coordinates	Entry number	Image
Carshalton House	Carshalton	House	1696–1713	16 March 1954	TQ2755164460; 51°21′54″N 0°10′09″W	1065627	Carshalton House More images
Carshalton House Water Pavilion	Carshalton	Orangery	Before 1721	16 March 1954	TQ2771464483; 51°21′54″N 0°10′01″W	1183926	Carshalton House Water Pavilion More images
Carshalton House Grotto	Carshalton	Grotto	Before 1721	16 March 1954	TQ2760764379; 51°21′51″N 0°10′06″W	1357608	Upload Photo
Church of All Saints	Carshalton	Church	12th century	16 March 1954	TQ2798464469; 51°21′54″N 0°09′47″W	1065683	Church of All Saints More images
Church of All Saints	Sutton	Church	19th century	28 August 1953	TQ2586165281; 51°22′22″N 0°11′35″W	1065697	Church of All Saints More images
Church of St Dunstan	Cheam, Sutton	Church	13th century	26 January 1971	TQ2428263916; 51°21′39″N 0°12′59″W	1065676	Church of St Dunstan More images
No. 19 Park Hill	Sutton	House	c. 1867	1 March 1974	TQ2755064024; 51°21′40″N 0°10′10″W	1183738	No. 19 Park Hill More images
Church of St Mary the Virgin	Beddington, Sutton	Church	14th or 15th century	21 January 1954	TQ2956865249; 51°22′17″N 0°08′24″W	1065670	Church of St Mary the Virgin More images
Beddington Place Pigeon House	Beddington, Sutton	Dovecote	Early 18th century	21 January 1954	TQ2954165374; 51°22′22″N 0°08′25″W	1065674	Beddington Place Pigeon House More images
Lumley Chapel	Cheam, Sutton	Church	12th century	28 August 1953	TQ2429963900; 51°21′38″N 0°12′58″W	1183440	Lumley Chapel More images
Whitehall	Cheam, Sutton	House	16th century	28 August 1953	TQ2422463766; 51°21′34″N 0°13′02″W	1357580	Whitehall More images
Church of St Nicholas	St Nicholas Road, Sutton	Church	1864	1 March 1974	TQ2577164158; 51°21′45″N 0°11′42″W	1065629	Church of St Nicholas More images

== Grade II ==
Name	Location	Type	Completed	Date designated	Grid ref. Geo-coordinates	Entry number	Image
Trinity Church	Cheam Road, Sutton	Church	1907	1 March 1974	TQ2561364111; 51°21′42″N 0°11′44″W	1200708	Trinity Church More images
