= Sutton Heritage Mosaic =

Public artwork in London

Coordinates: 51°21′43″N 0°11′34″W

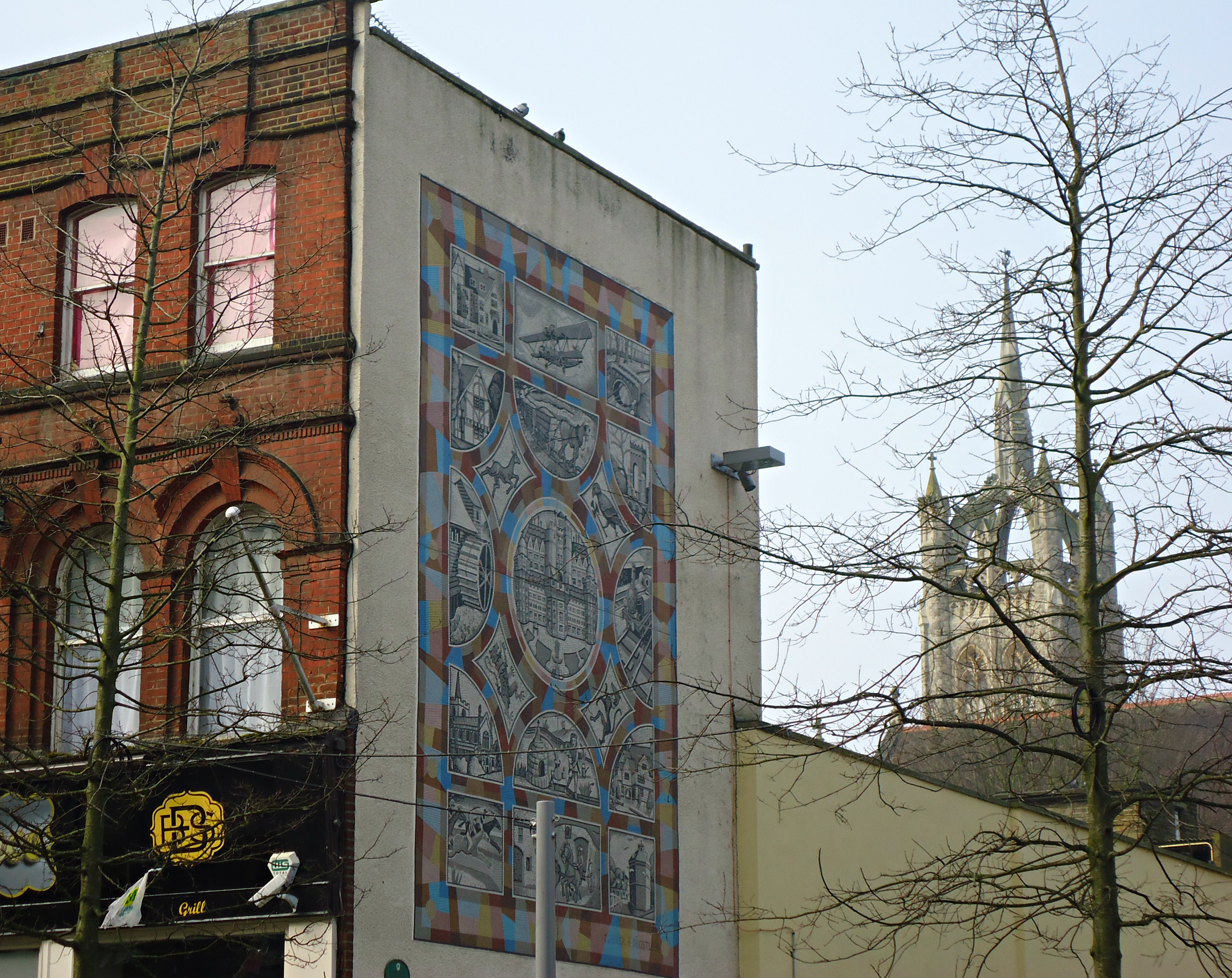
- Artists: Rob Turner and Gary Drostle
- Year: 1994
- Medium: Mosaic made with ceramic tile
- Location: Sutton, London, UK

The Sutton Heritage Mosaic is a large mural in the form of a mosaic situated in Sutton High Street in the town of Sutton in Greater London, England. One of the largest examples of wall art in Britain, it was commissioned by the London Borough of Sutton to celebrate the borough's heritage.

== Location ==
The mural is on the side of a three-storey building on the corner of High Street and St Nicholas Road at Trinity Square (the main town square).

== Description ==
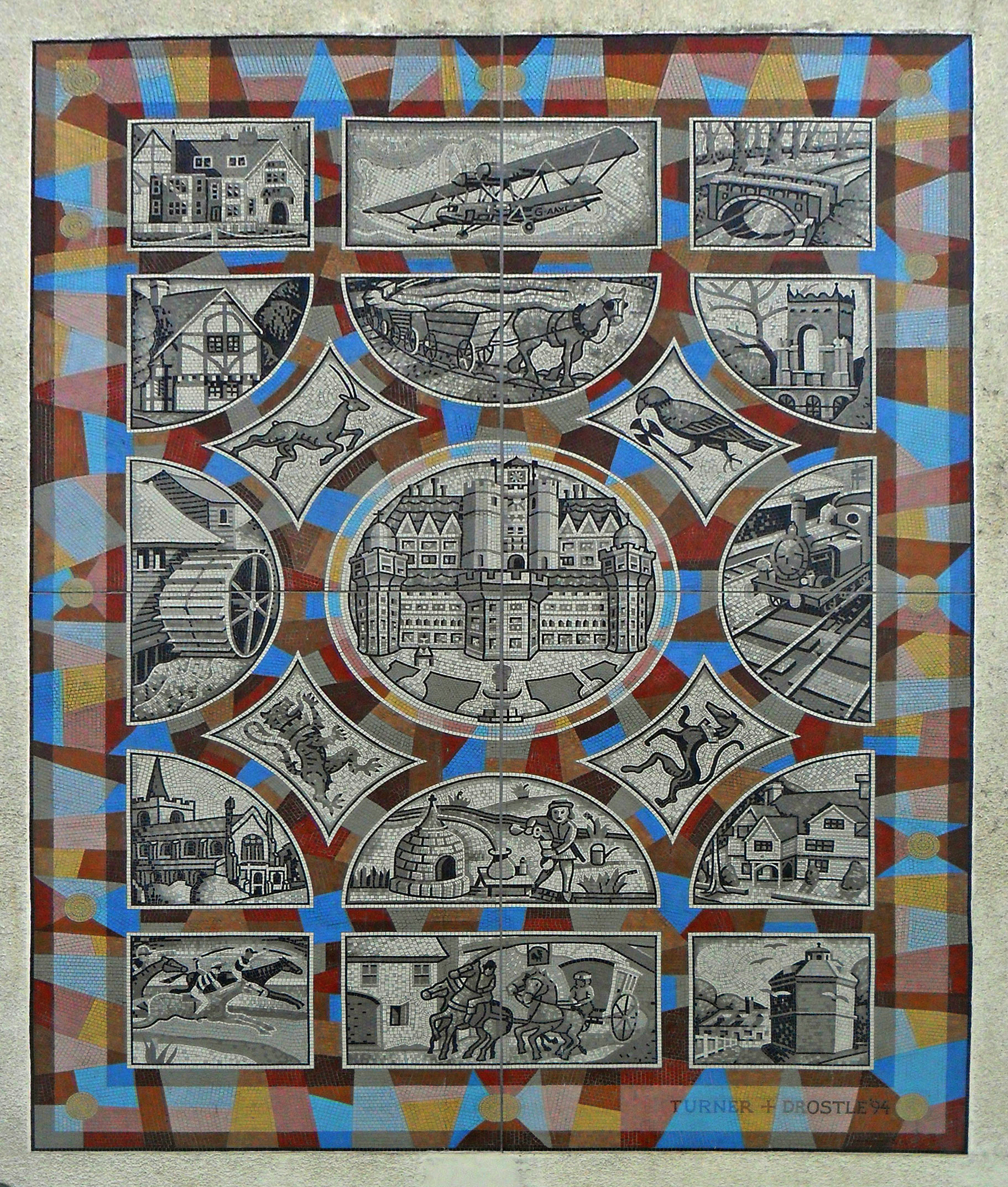
The Sutton Heritage Mosaic

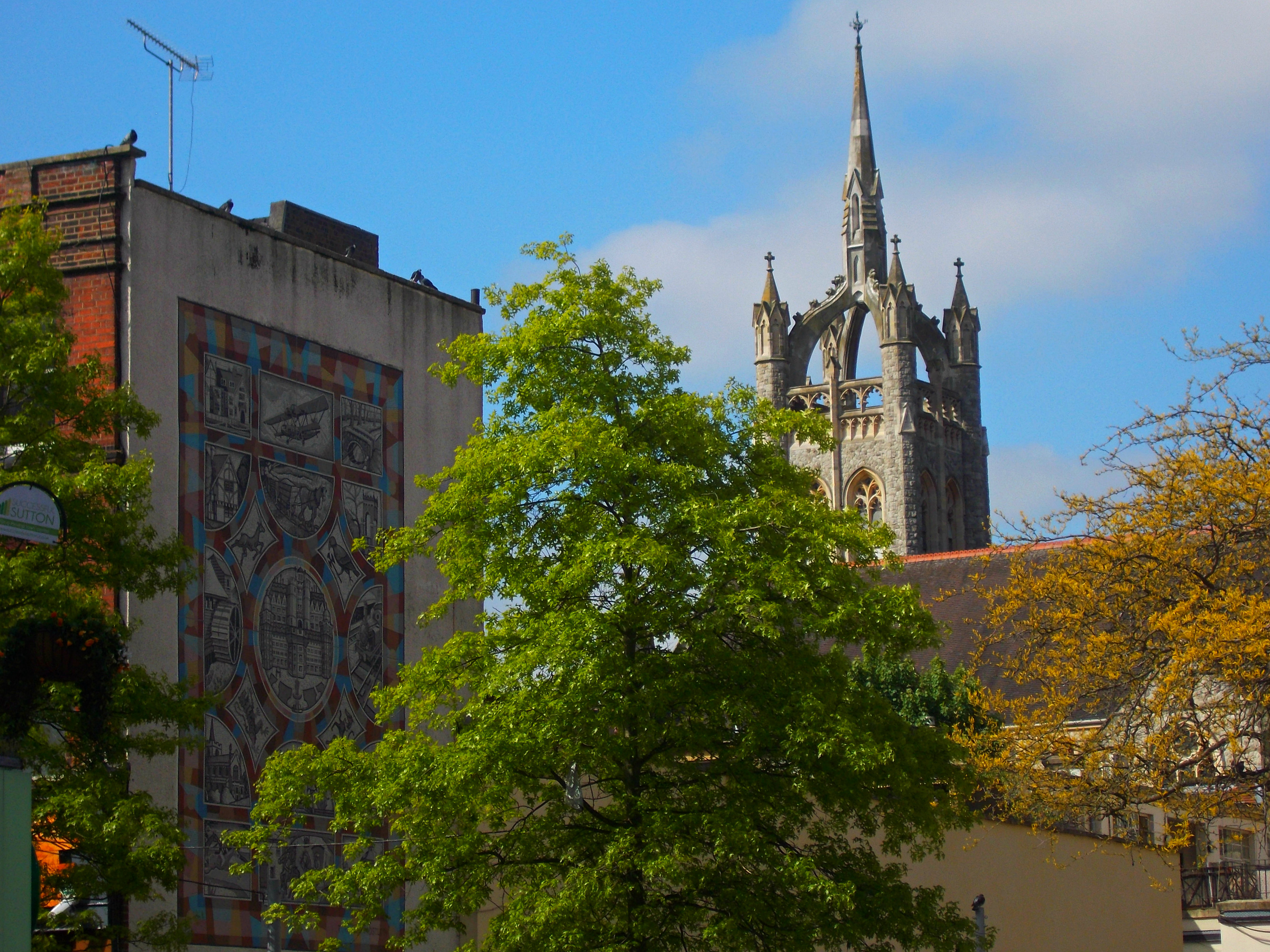
Trinity Square and the mosaic

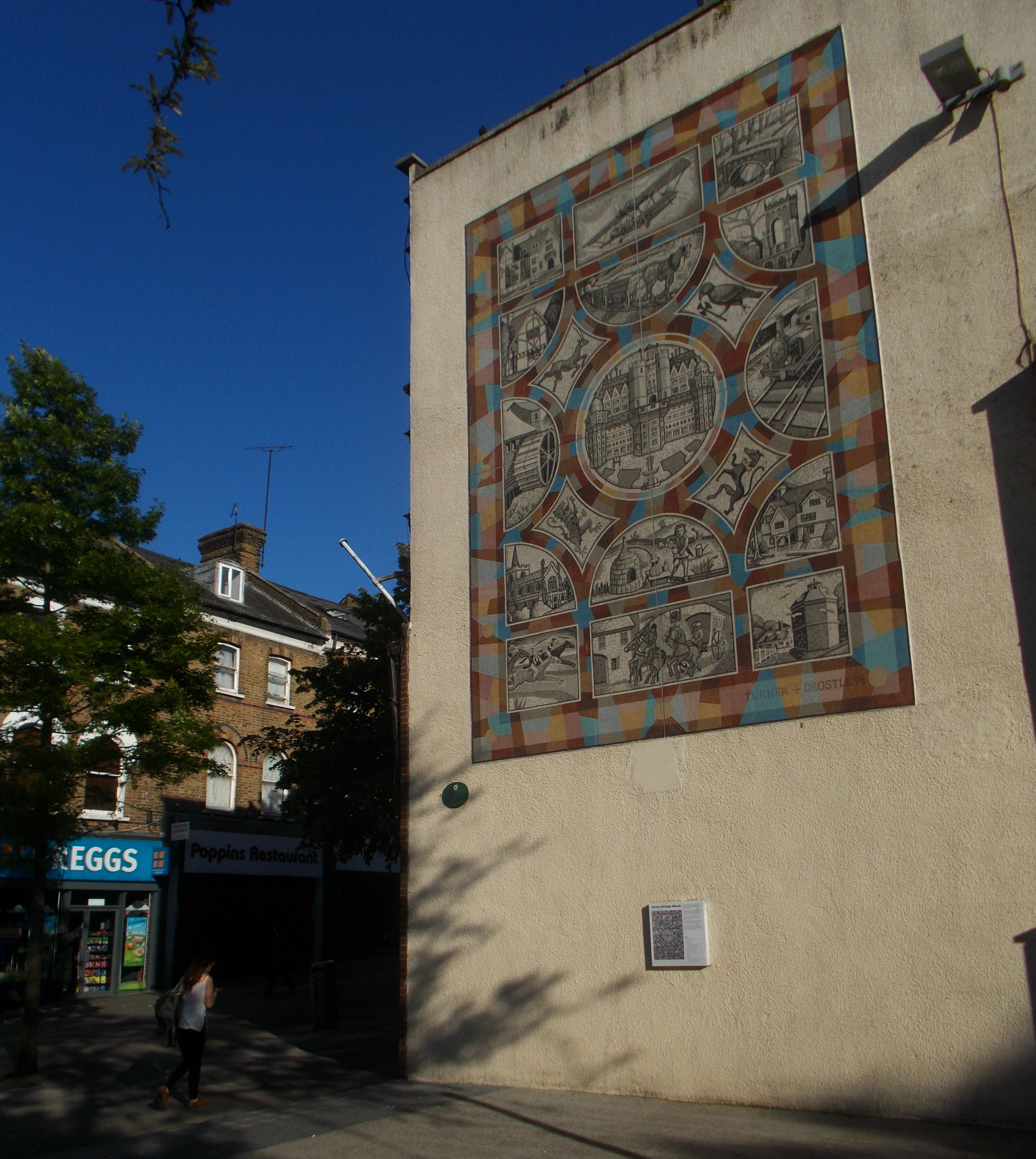
Sutton High St and the mosaic

Measuring 9 metres (30 ft) high by 5 metres (16 ft) wide, the mural depicts various aspects of Sutton's heritage and local history in nineteen black and white panels. The centrepiece is Henry VIII's Nonsuch Palace in Nonsuch Park. Surrounding this are shown the heraldic beasts of the coats of arms of the historic local families of Carew, Gaynesford and Lumley. The mural also features local heritage buildings such as Honeywood House and All Saints Church in Carshalton Village; and the Old Cottage and Whitehall in Cheam Village. Old industries are also covered, represented by the inclusion of a River Wandle mill. The early railway line, which was routed alongside the river is illustrated, as is a Hannibal biplane, which used the former Croydon Airport.

== Design and construction ==
The mural was designed by public artist Rob Turner, and created by him with fellow artist Gary Drostle. The artists had presented the borough's Public Arts Committee with six designs, and the Committee chose one, depicting local history in nineteen panels. Appledown Properties Ltd provided the financing.

The mosaic was created from vitreous ceramic tesserae and put in place in 1994. It was initially created in a studio, using the reverse technique, whereby a full-size outline was drawn on paper in reverse. The tiles were then affixed to the paper with flour-and-water glue. At the end of the process, the paper and glue were washed off with water and the mosaic was grouted and polished. Consisting of well over 100,000 pieces, the mosaic took over 1,500 hours to design and construct.

== 2011 information plaque ==
A plaque describing the panels was installed in 2011, and unveiled by Councillor Graham Tope, Executive Member for Community Safety, Leisure and Libraries, who said:

This beautiful mosaic has been a much-loved feature of our High Street for the past 17 years, but unless you're a historian the chances are you would not know what all of the intricate panels mean. I hope this plaque will encourage people to take a look, and for those already familiar with the mosaic, I hope it will help them to appreciate it even more.

== See also ==
- Sutton twin towns mural
- Sutton armillary
- The Messenger (sculpture in Sutton)
