= Nonesuch =

Nonesuch may refer to:

== Plants ==
- Lychnis chalcedonica, a wildflower
- Medicago lupulina, a wildflower

== Places and structures ==
- Nonesuch, Kentucky
- Nonesuch Island, Bermuda
- Nonesuch Mine, Michigan
- Nonesuch Palace, mis-spelling of Nonsuch, English royal palace
- Nonesuch River, Maine
- Nonesuch River Golf Course, Maine

== Other uses ==
- Nonesuch Press, publisher in London 1922–1960s
- Nonesuch Records, American record company
- The Nonesuch, 1962 novel by Georgette Heyer

== See also ==
- Nonsuch (disambiguation)
