= Jane Lumley, Baroness Lumley =

English noblewoman and translator (1537–1578)

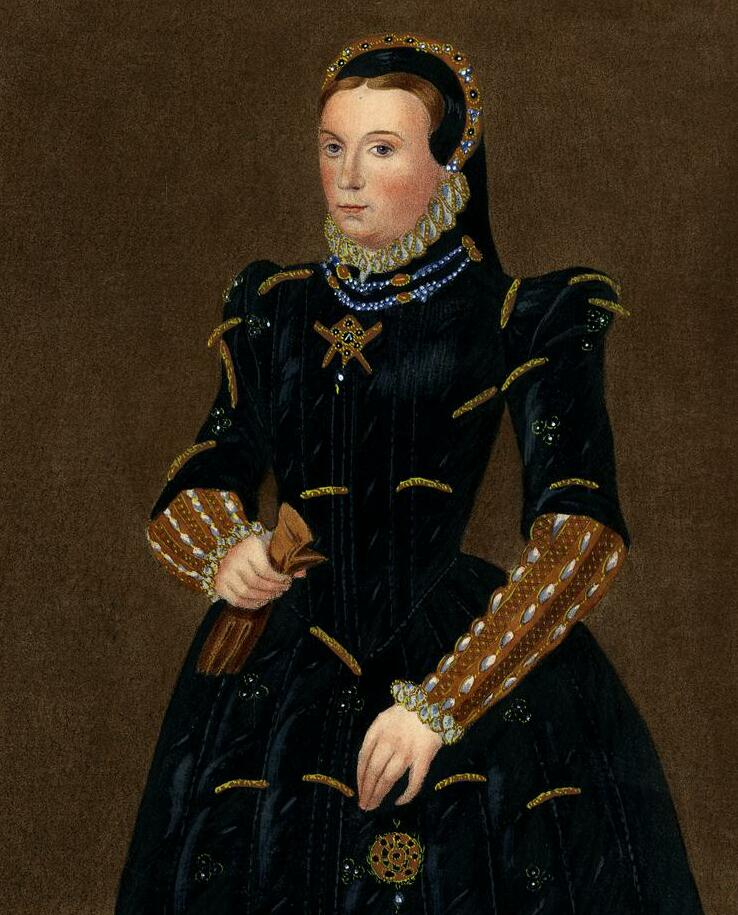
Portrait of Jane Lumley, Baroness Lumley, by Steven van der Meulen

Jane Lumley, Baroness Lumley (née Jane Fitzalan; 1537 – 27 July 1578), sometimes called Joanna, was an English noblewoman. She was the first person to translate Euripides into English.

== Life and family ==
Jane is the eldest child of three siblings, named Henry and Mary FitzAlan, and daughter of Henry FitzAlan, 19th Earl of Arundel and his first wife, Katherine Grey (died 1542). Arundel had Jane and her sister Mary educated very well, and his library, later known as the Lumley Library, was central to this project. She married John Lumley, first Baron Lumley (c. 1533–1609), between 1550 and 1553, when she was 12 or 15. They had three children, all of whom died in childhood. Lumley himself was a scholar, translator and book collector, who supported the literary activities of his wife.

The couple first lived at Lumley Castle in Durham, and then joined Arundel in Nonsuch Palace where Jane nursed her father through illness before predeceasing him. She is interred in the Lumley Chapel in Cheam in south London.

Lady Lumley was first cousin to Lady Jane Grey.

== Learning ==
Lady Lumley's scholarship and learning gained her a considerable contemporary reputation. She translated selected orations of Isocrates from Greek into Latin, and Euripides's Iphigeneia at Aulis from Erasmus's Latin translation, possibly also consulting the original Greek text, into English. Her manuscripts were preserved in her father's library, which was joined, after his death, to John Lumley's own considerable library and then passed into crown control in 1609.

Lady Lumley's translation of Iphigenia is the first known dramatic work to be written by a woman in English, and the first known translation of a classical play into English by any hand.

== Death and burial ==
Lady Lumley died on 27 July 1578. In 1596, Lumley's husband John erected a tomb for her in Lumley chapel in St. Dunstan's parish church in Cheam, in which Jane Lumley and her three children were interred.

With the death of Jane, her nephew, Philip Howard was left the sole heir to the titles and all of the vast estates of the FitzAlan family, including the Arundel Castle estates which Philip received after the death of Henry in February 1580.

== Sources ==
- Claire Buck, ed. "Lumley, Joanna Fitzalan (c. 1537-1576/77)", The Bloomsbury Guide to Women's Literature. New York: Prentice Hall, 1992, p. 764
- Caroline Coleman, "Lumley, Joanna, Lady", British Women Writers: A Critical Reference Guide. London: Routledge, 1989, p. 427
