= Lumley inventories =

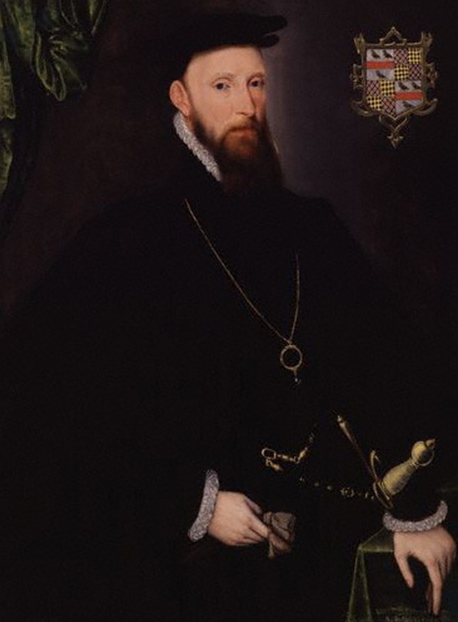
John Lumley, 1st Baron Lumley

The Lumley inventories are a group of inventories documenting the extensive collections of paintings, books, sculptures, silver and furniture accumulated by John, 1st Baron Lumley (c.1533–1609). The most celebrated of these, a manuscript volume which incorporates a considerable amount of heraldic and genealogical material as well as the inventory itself, is sometimes known as the "Red Velvet Book" (from its later binding), and sometimes simply as "the Lumley Inventory". It is often dated to 1590, although it is in reality a more complex composite volume including material dating from 1586 to 1595. Further inventories were drawn up for purposes of probate on Lord Lumley's death in 1609; and others when parts of the collection were sold in the 18th and early 19th centuries.

== The inventories ==
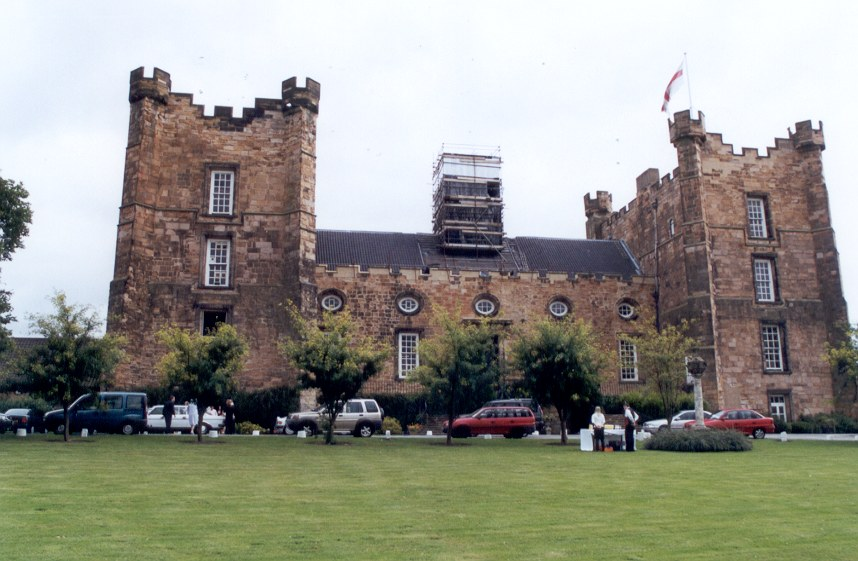
Lumley Castle

The greater part of the Red Velvet Book comprises genealogical material, reflecting Lumley's fascination with his own ancestry. The earliest and most extensive pedigree, which charts the Lumley descent from a Saxon nobleman named Liulph, is dated 1586, and has been identified as the work of Robert Glover, Somerset Herald.

The main inventory records the household contents, including artworks, at Lumley's residences of Nonsuch Palace, Surrey, Lumley Castle, County Durham, and at Hart Street, Tower Hill, London. It was prepared by John Lampton, Lumley's steward, and is dated 22 May 1590, at the time that Lumley was beginning to negotiate the sale of Nonsuch to Queen Elizabeth. The volume also includes coloured drawings, probably also made in about 1590, showing monuments, furniture and architectural elements at Nonsuch and Lumley Castle (some of which can still be seen at Lumley Castle), and three tomb monuments commissioned by Lumley for himself and his two wives in the Lumley Chapel at Cheam, Surrey. There is also a textual description of Lumley Castle. Additions to the contents of the volume are dated to as late as 1595.

A catalogue of Lumley's library of some 3,000 volumes was prepared by Anthony Alcock (a member of the household of Lumley's protégé Anthony Watson) in 1596. Another inventory of the pictures at Lumley Castle, and a revised catalogue of the library, were drawn up following Lumley's death in April 1609. Further inventories of paintings were compiled for the sales of much of the collection in 1785 and 1807.

== History of the Lumley collections ==
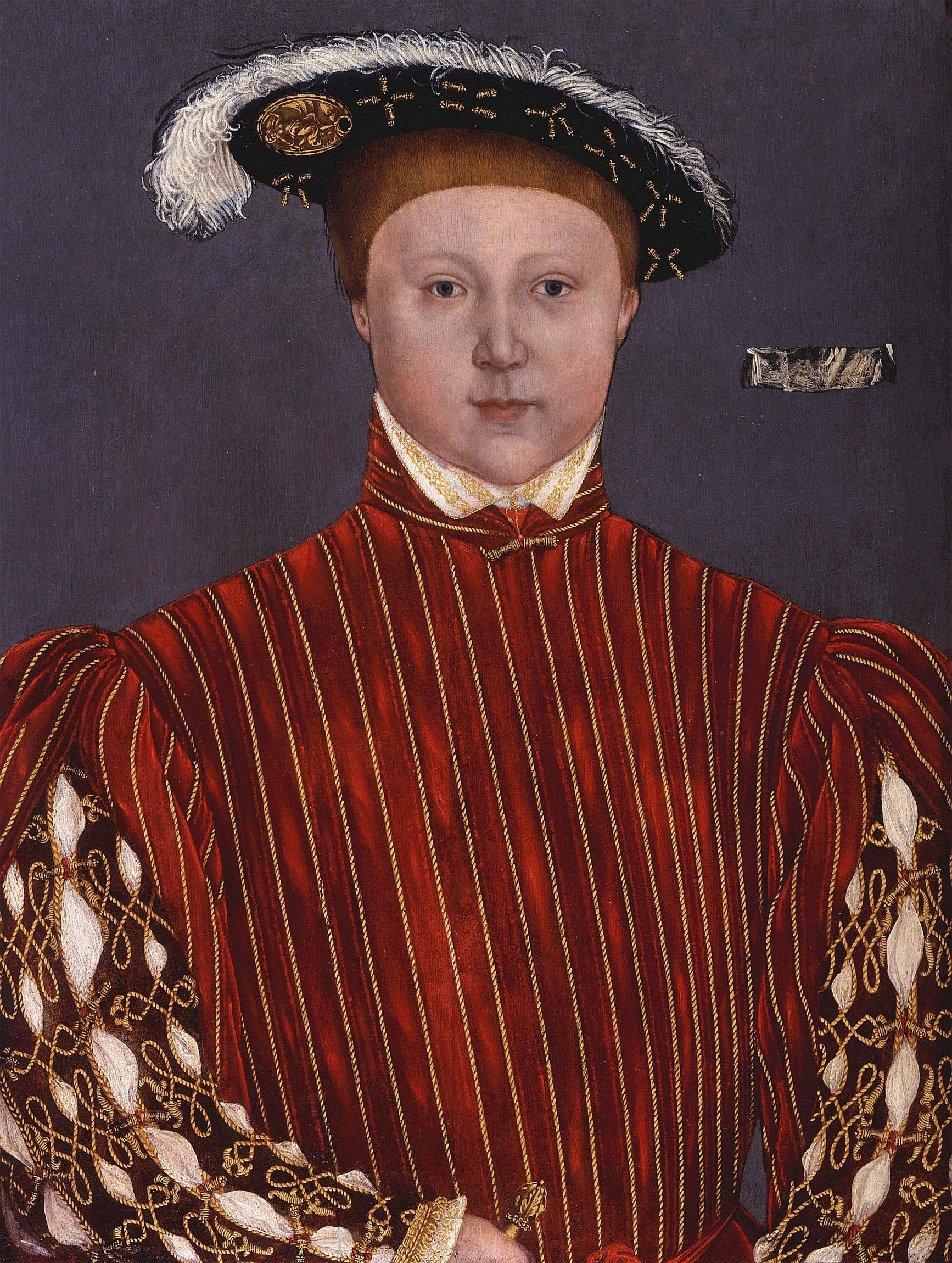
Portrait of Edward VI of England after Hans Holbein the Younger, called "The Lumley portrait of King Edward VI, as Prince of Wales". The Lumley cartellino can be seen on the right of the portrait.

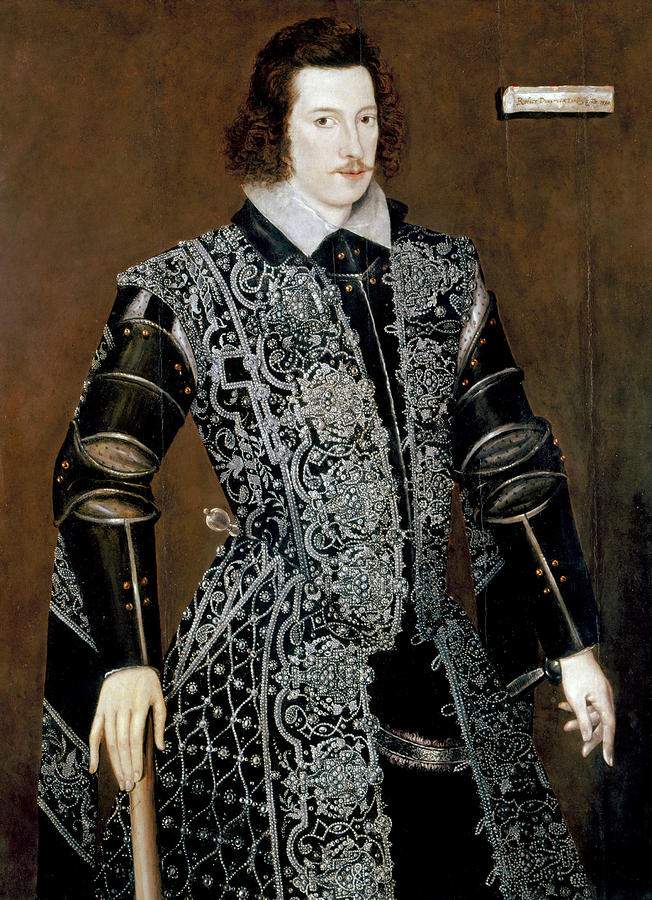
Portrait of Robert Devereux, 2nd Earl of Essex, by William Segar, showing the Lumley cartellino, now in the National Gallery of Ireland

The Lumley Inventories demonstrate Lumley's passion for collecting portraits. His collection was the largest in Elizabethan England and was housed in three of his residences – his house on Tower Hill as well as Lumley Castle and Nonsuch Palace. The collection included portraits of 196 contemporary sitters, and (unlike most inventories of the period) often named the painter.

The nucleus of the collection was acquired from his father-in-law, Henry Fitzalan, 19th Earl of Arundel. A dozen or so pictures from the collection of the Robert Dudley, 1st Earl of Leicester were incorporated into the Lumley collection. The collection included a portrait of Lady Jane Grey which may subsequently have become part of the Northwick Park Collection, although it was said to be of Catherine Parr.

Lord Lumley was the uncle of Thomas Howard, 21st Earl of Arundel, a prominent connoisseur in the early 17th century. Arundel inherited some of Lumley's collection of paintings, including the portrait of the Duchess of Milan, now in the National Gallery. However, a considerable portion of the collection went to Lumley Castle and remained there, eventually being inherited by the Earls of Scarbrough. The Lumley collection of paintings was largely dispersed in sales that took place in 1785 and 1807. Many works from the inventories can be recognised by distinctive cartellini (trompe-l'œil representations of inscribed labels) added to some – but not all – of the paintings. An example of the cartellino can be seen on the portrait of Edward VI, after Holbein.

The bulk of Lumley's library passed on his death as a gift to Henry, Prince of Wales, and in due course to the British Museum (now the British Library) in 1757.

== Scholarly awareness and publication ==
The first antiquarian to become aware of the Red Velvet Book was George Vertue, who mentioned it in notes made in 1735. Shortly afterwards it was also noted by Horace Walpole. An edited version of the 1609 inventory of paintings was published in Robert Surtees’ History and Antiquities of the County Palatine of Durham in 1820.

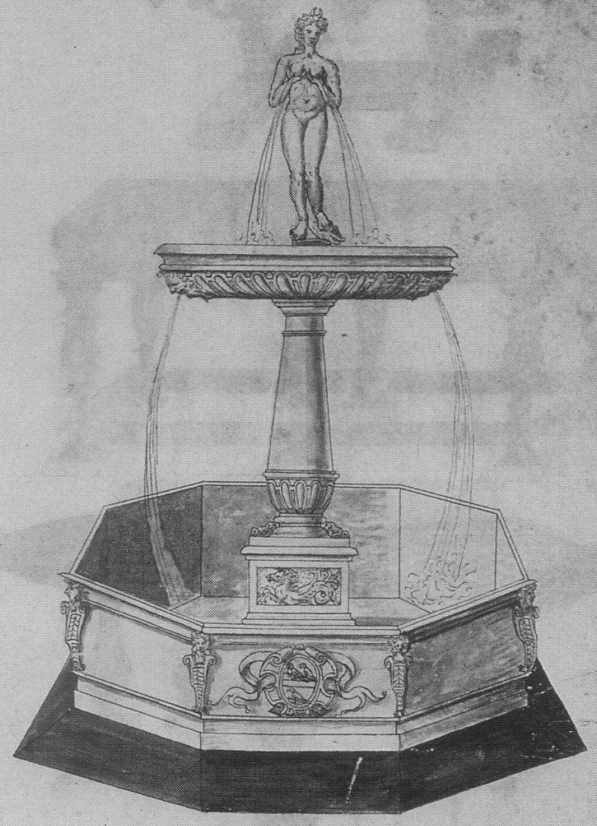
The Diana Fountain at Nonsuch Palace: one of the drawings from the Red Velvet Book

The textual content of the Red Velvet Book (excluding the genealogical material and the drawings) was published in 1904 by Edith Milner in her book Records of the Lumleys of Lumley Castle. It was published again, omitting the description of Lumley Castle but including 20 monochrome plates of the drawings, by Lionel Cust in 1918 in the sixth volume of the Walpole Society. Cust also included four of the later (much shorter) inventories, one undated, one of 1785, and two of 1807. In the same volume, Mary Hervey published the 1609 inventory of paintings in full.

The 1609 library catalogue was published by Sears Jayne and Francis Johnson in 1956.

The Red Velvet Book in its entirety was published in a limited edition by the Roxburghe Club in 2010, in full colour facsimile and accompanied by twelve scholarly contextual essays, under the editorship of Mark Evans.

== Use of the inventories in art history ==
The inventories have been described as "the most important documents in the history of English art in the second half of the sixteenth century". The 1590 inventory contains valuable information respecting early historical portraits in England, and has been used to identify a number of artists operating in England during the reign of Elizabeth I. Using information from the 1590 inventory, Lionel Cust was able to establish that the painter using the monogram HE was Hans Eworth. Sir David Piper identified more than twenty paintings on which the cartellino can still be seen. He also put forward the view that the phrase "done by Seigar" in the 1590 inventory referred to the portrait of Robert Devereux, 2nd Earl of Essex in the National Gallery of Ireland.

== Bibliography ==
- Barron, Kathryn (2003). "The Collecting and Patronage of John, Lord Lumley (c.1535–1609)". In Chaney, Edward (ed.). The Evolution of English Collecting: Receptions of Italian Art in the Tudor and Stuart Periods. New Haven: Yale University Press. pp. 125–58. ISBN 0300102240.
- Barron, Kathryn (2007) [2004]. "Lumley, John, first Baron Lumley (c.1533–1609)". Oxford Dictionary of National Biography (online ed.). Oxford University Press. doi:10.1093/ref:odnb/17179. (subscription required)
- Cust, Lionel (1918). "The Lumley Inventories". Walpole Society. 6: 15–35.
- Evans, Mark, ed. (2010). The Lumley Inventory and Pedigree: art collecting and lineage in the Elizabethan Age: facsimile and commentary on the manuscript in the possession of the Earls of Scarbrough. Roxburghe Club. ISBN 978-0-903912-11-2.
- Gooch, Leo (2009). A Complete Pattern of Nobility: John Lord Lumley (c.1534-1609). Rainton Bridge: University of Sunderland Press.
- Hervey, Mary F.S. (1918). "A Lumley Inventory of 1609". Walpole Society. 6: 37–46.
- Milner, Edith (1904). Benham, Edith (ed.). Records of the Lumleys of Lumley Castle. London: George Bell.
- Jayne, Sears; Johnson, Francis R., eds. (1956). The Lumley Library: the catalogue of 1609. London: British Museum.
- Piper, David (1957). "The 1590 Lumley Inventory: Hilliard, Segar and the Earl of Essex". Burlington Magazine. 99: 224–31, 299–303.
- Simon, Robin (2010). "The Lumley Inventory and the Lumley Chapel". British Art Journal. 11 (1): 4–5.
