= James Boevey =

English merchant (1622–1696)

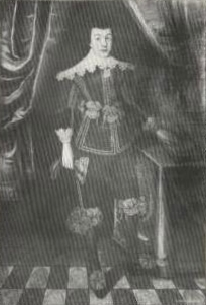
Portrait of James Boevey (1622–1696) aged 11, inscribed: "James Boevey An(n)o Dom(ini): 1634 Aetatis Suae 11 ("A.D. 1634 of his age 11"). In 1973 the painting was in the collection of Mr F.B.Watkins, owner of Flaxley Abbey, Gloucestershire. An inferior 19th-century copy was painted and published in Crawley-Boevey, A.W.C., The Perverse Widow (1898). MacDermot, E.T. stated: "The original canvas shows only that it was painted in 1634 when its subject was eleven years old, the title being added later. This led Mr Crawley-Boevey to suggest (in his "Notes on the Antiquities at Flaxley Abbey" (1912)) that the portrait was of Boevey's nephew, Abraham Clarke, who was eleven in the latter part of 1634. He overlooked the fact that James Boevey's twelfth birthday was not until 7 May 1634 and the family tradition has always been that it is a companion portrait to that of his sister Joanna, painted when she was eleven in 1616. It is listed as such in the family records and undoubtedly portrays Boevey"

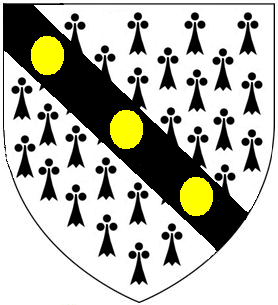
Armorials of James Boevey (1622–1695) as shown on his mural monument in the Lumley Chapel, nr. St Dunstan's Church, Cheam, Surrey: Ermine, on a bend sable three bezants

James Boevey (1622–1696) (pronounced "Boovey") was an English merchant, lawyer and philosopher of Huguenot parentage.

== Origins ==
He was born in London at 6 a.m. on 7 May 1622 in Mincing Lane, in the parish of St. Dunstan-in-the-East. He was the youngest son of Andreas Boevey (c. 1566–1625) by his second wife Joanna der Wilde (d. 1644), daughter of Peter der Wilde. Andreas Boevey was a Dutch Huguenot from Courtrai in Flanders who had been brought to England aged 7 by his Huguenot parents following the invasion of the Low Countries by the Duke of Alva and the Duke's subsequent persecutions. Andreas had nine children by his first wife Esther Fenn and two by his second wife, the eldest of whom was James. James's mother remarried in 1628 Johannes van Abeele, a widower and member of the Dutch emigree community in Norwich.

== Education ==
He was educated at the Mercers' School in London, where his tutor was Mr Augur. In 1631 he went to the Netherlands to complete his schooling in Latin and Greek. In 1636 he embarked on a "grand tour" of Europe to perfect his cultural education.

== Career ==
=== Mercantile career ===
Boevey started his career working for the Dutch-born financier Sir William Courten (d. 1636), discoverer of Barbados. Boeve married in 1638 Susanna Dwyer, the niece of John Money, Courten's business partner in the great firm of silk and linen merchants Courten and Money. He then worked as cashier for the banker Dierik Hoste, and also for the Spanish Ambassador in London.

=== Agent for exiled King Charles II ===
During the Commonwealth whilst King Charles II was in exile on the continent, James Boevey was described in a petition later made by his son-in-law Captain William Hinton as: "Mr James Boeve of Middleburg in Zeeland... the person through whom most of the King's business passed during his exile, a duty which he fulfilled with integrity and with expense even to ruin. Yet he never asked reward, and declared that he would be satisfied if his son-in-law obtained the Government of Newfoundland". Hinton was later appointed Governor of Newfoundland.

=== Jailed by States of Zealand ===
The following record dated 29 June 1672 from the Calendar of Treasury Books explains the circumstances of Boevey's jail sentence in Zealand:

Representation to the King from the Treasury Lords concerning the case of Mr. James Bovey (Bovy), referred to said Lords by the order of Council of March 22 last, to hear and examine, in order to your Majesty's insisting upon reasonable satisfaction for your said injured subject when it shall be reasonable. Said James Boeve, merchant of London, married Susanna Dwyer, the daughter of John Moneye['s] only sister, who died in 1631 at Middleburg in Zealand, and left said Susanna a legacy of £2,000, as likewise the same legacy to the other sister Hester, who was married to John White and received her legacy from Sir William Courteen, who with one Boudean [Bowden], the son of Peter Bouden (whose window Money married), was left executor. When James Boven came to demand his legacy in the right of Susanna, his wife, Bowden, the other executor, who had drawn the most part of the estate into his hands, delayed him payment for four or five years with fair speeches. At last Boeve, finding himself abused, commenced his suit at Middleburg and obtained sentence for the payment of the legacy and interest. For the execution of this sentence he solicited a long time, but although your Majesty wrote in 1660, Aug. 15 to the States of Zealand that he might have the benefit of the sentence, yet nothing was done therein. By the law and custom there, there is no appeal to the High Court of Justice before such sentence given be performed, yet, notwithstanding, an appeal to the Great Council at the Hague was obtained and hath there depended ever since, your Majesty's letter to the States General demanding justice to be done to the said Boeve and the frequent solicitations of your minister for the expedition thereof being not at all regarded, but he hath been still delayed and denied having any end thereof. And not only was this injustice used towards the said Boeve but also they found means by false suggestions and pretences of debt, by a sentence of the Court of Admiralty of Zealand, to throw the said Boeve in prison without being heard by himself or his attorney, and continued all these injuries and injustices by the practice of the said Peter Bowden, who is a Comr. in the East India Company, although it appeared by an Act in the said court that the said suggestions and pretences are false. By all which said Boeve has been damaged above £20,000, besides the utter ruin of his credit and trade by being detained three years in prison. We represent his condition to your Majesty as a suitable time for your Majesty to insist on reparation for him by recommending his case to the Duke of Buckingham and the Earl of Arlington, Plenipotentiaries now in Holland, the cause being still depending at the Hague before the High Council and not concluded by any treaty with the States General".

=== Legal career ===
Boevey withdrew from commerce and studied law at the Inner Temple, to which he was admitted on 10 June 1660. His legal training was largely utilized in launching his own personal law-suits over property in Chelsea, Gloucestershire and in the Netherlands.

=== Literary career ===
Boevey devised what he called "Active Philosophy", which might be described today as "self-help" literature, which he described in a series of volumes, mostly written in 1665 and 1666, which were never published, but circulated amongst his friends. The volumes still extant are:

- The Art of Building a Man, or, Education
- The Government of Action
- The Government of Friendshipp
- The Government of Enmities
- The Government of Law-Suites
- The Government of Amor Conjugalis ("Married Love")
- The Causes of the Diseases of the Mind
- The Cures of the Mind
- The Art of Discerning Men
- The Art of Man's Selfe
- The Vindication of that Hero of Political Learning, Nicholas Machiavel, the Second Tacitus, written following Boevey's visit to Florence in 1642.
- The Secret Algebraick Key to Treasure, Parallel to the Philosopher's Stone Invented by James Boevey Esq., of Cheam in Surrey, thought to be a monument to the contribution made by Dutch-emigree financiers to the establishment of the Bank of England in 1694. Written before 1692. Boevey presented a copy of this book to the Bodleian Library when aged 70. The Bodleian catalogue describes its copy: "A note (c. 1700) inserted at the end describes the volume, which consists of lists of numbers without text, perhaps relating to problems of currency, as: Mr Boevay's mysterious Book given to the publick library as a great Treasure. He promised to send a Clavis (i.e. key) to it, but is dead. On the inner back cover is a dedicatory authograph letter, undated, by the author, and a certificate in favour of the book by Cowemberg Van Blois of Amsterdam, Algebraical Accountant."

Amongst his writings now lost are:

- The Characters, or, Index Rerum, in Four Tomes ("Index of Things")
- The Introduction to Active Philosophy
- The Art of Conversation
- The Art of Complyance
- The Art of Governing the Tongue
- The Art of Governing the Penn
- The Government of Resolution
- The Government of Reputation
- The Government of Power
- The Government of Servients
- The Art of Gaining Wealth With the Family
- The Art of Buying and Selling
- The Art of Preserving Wealth
- The Art of Expending Wealth
- The Government of Secrecy
- Of Amor Concupcentiae ("Covetous Love")
- The Government of Felicity
- The Laws of Atticus
- Religion from Reason
- The Life of Cum-fu-zu, So Farr Wrote by J.B.
- The Life of Mahomet, Wrote By Sir W.R.'s Papers, With Some Small Addition for Methodizing the Same

He was a friend of John Aubrey, John Evelyn and of Elias Ashmole, the latter with whom he shared an interest in the occult. Samuel Pepys dined with him and in his Diaries noted as follows: "A solicitor and a lawyer and a merchant altogether who hath travelled very much; did talk some things well, only he is a Sir Positive; but talk of travel over the Alps very fine".

== Property acquired ==
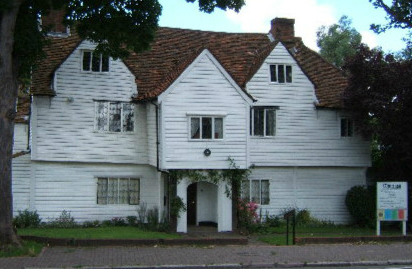
Whitehall in Cheam, built c. 1500, believed to have been Boevey's residence

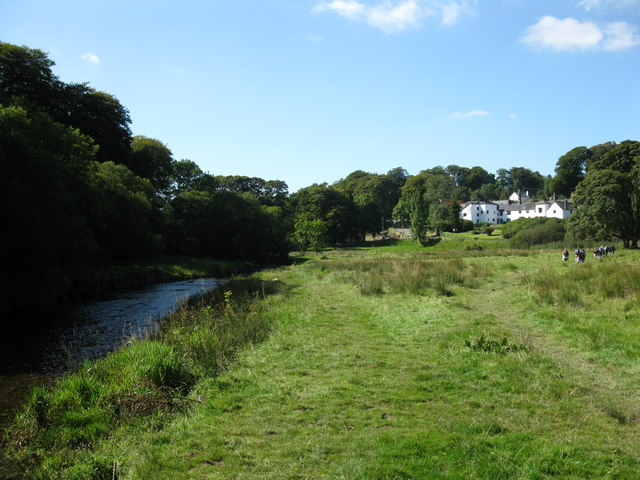
Simonsbath House, built by James Boevey in the centre of Exmoor Forest beside the River Barle. On a beam above the old kitchen fireplace is carved the date "1654"

=== Flaxley Abbey ===
With his half-brother William, Boevey purchased Flaxley Abbey in the Forest of Dean, Gloucestershire.

=== Exmoor Forest ===
In 1653 he purchased from Cromwell's government the freehold of the former Royal Forest of Exmoor in Somerset, and in 1654 was the first to build a house on the desolate moorland, at a central spot called Simonsbath. The house stands today, known as Simonsbath House (now a hotel), and retains the carved date of "1654" on a beam in the kitchen. He did not persevere long in his residence on Exmoor, and by 1670 he had moved to Whitehall, Cheam in Surrey, whilst retaining his financial interest in the income from Exmoor derived from local graziers, whose rents he increased much to their displeasure.

== Marriage and children ==
James Boevey married three times. The identity of the mothers of most of his children is known with the exception of "Bateman", a married son named in his will. He married as follows:

- Firstly on 1 May 1638 in St Mary-at-Hill, London, to Suanna Dwyer (d. 1649, Middleburg, Zeeland) or van der Weyer/Weijer, daughter of Andreas van der Weyer by Susanna der Monchy/Money (d. 1631) The latter was the only sister of the merchant John Money (d. 1632), who had married (as her second husband) Margaret Courten, sister of Sir William Courten (1572–1636). With Sir William Courten's younger brother Sir Peter Courten, they established the great firm of silk and linen merchants Courten and Money. Susanna Dwyer, Boevey's wife, was the heiress to £2,000 from her uncle John Money, the business partner of Sir William Courten. The pursuit of this legacy by Boevey led to his imprisonment in the Netherlands. They had two, possibly three, daughters:
  - Margarett, baptised 14 April 1639 in St Mary-at-Hill, London
  - Hester, baptised 22 September 1640 in St Mary-at-Hill, London
  - (?)Elizabeth, who married Captain Sir William Hinton, captain of the ship Adventurer which traded with Newfoundland
- Secondly, in about 1653, to Isabella de Visscher (d. post 21/8/1669), daughter of William de Visscher an emigree merchant from Emden. They had two children:
  - William (d. 1692) who predeceased his father, married in 1686 Catherina Riches (1671–1727), daughter of John Riches Esq. Catherina Boevey was married aged 15 and famously lived a long, virtuous and philanthropic life at Flaxley Abbey in Gloucestershire.
  - Cornelia
- Thirdly, after 1669, to Margaretta Cresset (1638–1714), by whom he had no issue, and who survived him 18 years dying aged 76 as the couple's marble mural monument in the Lumley Chapel by St Dunstan's Church in Cheam records.

== Portraits ==
A portrait of James Boevey was published on page 34 of Crawley-Boevey, A.W.C., The Perverse Widow, Being Passages from the Life of Catharina, Wife of William Boevey, 1898. Also an oil painting portrait is said to exist at Flaxley Abbey. In appearance he was very short, described by Aubrey as: "5 ft tall, and slenderly built, with extremely black hair curled at the ends, an equally black beard, and the darkest of eyebrows hovering above dark but sprightly hazel eyes" In character he was deemed by Aubrey "A person of great temperance and deepe thoughts, and a working head never idle, ever a great lover of Natural Philosophie. From fourteen he had a candle burning by him all night with pen, inke and paper to write downe thoughts as they came into his head, so that he might not loose a thought".

== Death and burial ==
He died at Cheam and was buried on 13 January 1695 as his mural monument in the Lumley Chapel in the grounds of St Dunstans Church records: "In memory of James Bovey (sic) Esq.r who was buried near this place Jan.ry ye 13th 1695. And also of Margaretta his wife buried here August ye 3d. 1714 in ye 76th year of her age".

== Will ==
The probate transcript of James Boevey's last will and testament, dated 7 William III (i.e. 1694), (day and month apparently omitted or illegible on copy) is held by the National Archives at Kew In it he leaves all his property to his wife Margaret, and only the small sums of ten pounds each to his son Bateman, otherwise unknown of, and to the latter's wife. His son William had predeceased him in 1692.

In the name of God Amen. I James Boevey of Cheam in the county of Surrey Esq. being of sound and perfect memory praised be Almighty God hopeing by his mercy to have everlasting life doe make this my last will and testament. Imprimis my will is that I be buried privately without ffunerall pomps and solemnities. Item I give all that lease and interest I have in the house in which I now live in the said parish of Cheam with all the household stuff, plate, linen, goods and chattells whatsoever which shall be found in or about the same at the time of my death unto my loveing wife Margarett Boevey. And as for and concerning all that residue or remainder of my estate or terme of thirty yeares and seven moneths (wherein about twenty seven yeares are yet to come) in the fforest of Exmore in the countys of Devon and Somersett and divers other things ................................ granted to me by the late Duke of Ormond I give and devise the said lease or term of yeares and fforest with the appurtenances and every other matter and thing so devised to me by the said Duke to my said loveing wife Margarett Boevey. And as for and concerning all that my estate of inheritance in the tythes of the said fforest of Exmore with the appurtenances and all other my hereditaments whatsoever in or near the said fforest by me purchased of James Milles Esq. I give and devise the same and all my right title interest and claim therein in law or equity to my said loveing wife Margarett Boevey and her heires for ever. I give unto my son Bateman and his wife tenn pounds apeace. And whereas I am intituled by virtue of a decree of the High Court of Chancery made in a cause wherein I am p(lainti)ff against Dame Ann Smith widow and John Boevey Def(endan)ts unto two full fifth parts the whole in five equall parts to be divided of certain messuages lands and tenements in Little Chelsea in the county of Midd(lese)x and demanded by the Bill of Complaint exhibited in the said cause and to the rents and profitts of the same and to severall sumes of money due to me for the arrearages of rent thereof. Now my mind and will is And I do hereby give and devise my said two fifth parts of the said messuages lands and tenements and the whole of all other my messuages tenements and hereditaments whatsoever in Chelsea aforesaid and Kensington in the county of Midd(lese)x or either of them And all my estate right title and interest therein unto my dear and loveing wife Margarett Boevey and her heires for ever. Item I further give and bequeath unto my said wife all and every sume and sumes of money which now are and at the time of my death shall be due unto me for arrearages of rent or for the issues or profitts of the premises aforesaid. Item I give and bequeath all my moneys in cash and all my cattle and debts oweing to me at the time of my death and all other my goods and chattells reall and personall whatsoever to my said loveing wife Margarett Boevey for her own use whom I hereby make my sole executrix of this my will hereby revoking and making void all former and other wills at any time before by me made touching or concerning the disposall of all or any part of the premisses herein and hereby disposed of given and bequeathed as aforesaid. In testimony whereof I the said James Boevey have hereunto sett my hand and seale this ................... day of.................... and in the seaventh yeare of the reigne of our Soveraigne Lord William the third by the grace of God of England Scotland Ffrance and Ireland King Defender of the Faith Anno Domini one thousand six hundred ninety five – James Boevey – signed sealed published and declared by the said James Boevey as his last will and testament in the presence of us and subscribed and attested in the presence and by the direction of the said testator by us: Samuel Parson; Henry Lloyd; Charles Angiband; Thomas Saige.

Probatum Londini fuit huiusmodi testamentum corum venerabili viro Will'mo King legum doctore surrogato venerabilis et ......... viri domini Richardi Raines militis legum etiam doctoris Curia Prerogativa Cantuariensis magistri custodis sive comisarii legitime constitute quinto die mensis ffebruarii Anno Domini (stilo Anglia) millesimo sexcentesimo nonagesimo quinto juramento Margareta Boevey relicta dicti defuncti et executrix in dicte testamento nominata cui comissa fuit administratio omnium et singulorum bonorum jurium et ............ dicti defuncti de bene et fideliter administrando eadem ad .......... Dei Evangel jurat.....(i.e. proved in the Prerogative Court of Canterbury the 5th February 1695 with Margaret Boevey acting as executrix)

== Armorials ==
The armorials of James Boevey as painted on his mural monument (impaled with the arms of his wife) in the Lumley Chapel, near St Dunstan's Church, Cheam, Surrey, are: Ermine, on a bend sable three bezants. It is unknown whether this monument has been re-painted or restored. The arms of Boevey are given differently by Cleveland as: Or, on a chevron sable three plates. Furthermore on the 1712 engraving of Flaxley Abbey by Johannes Kip published in Robert Atkyns' "The Ancient & Present State of Gloucestershire" (published in monochrome & tinted later), when it was the residence of Catherina Boevey, the arms depicted are again different. The grant of arms to Crawley-Boevey is recorded as: Ermine, on a bend gules between two martlets sable three gouttes d'or The latter arms are borne today, but in the form of a chief only above other heraldic elements, by the Crawley-Boevey baronets.

== See also ==
- Crawley-Boevey baronets
