= Lumley Chapel =

Coordinates: 51.3606°N 0.2161°W

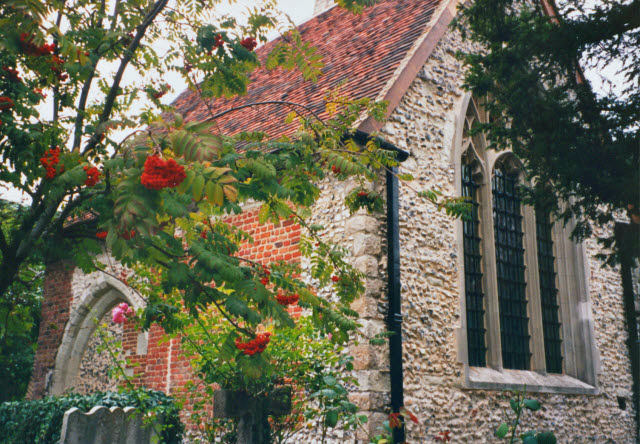
- The Lumley Chapel from the southeast

- Location in Sutton
- OS grid reference: TQ 243 638
- Location: Cheam, London Borough of Sutton
- Country: England
- Denomination: Anglican
- Website: Churches Conservation Trust

History
- Former name(s): St Dunstan's Church, Cheam
- Dedication: Saint Dunstan

Architecture
- Functional status: Redundant
- Heritage designation: Grade II*
- Designated: 28 August 1953
- Architectural type: Church
- Style: Norman, Gothic
- Closed: 1864

Specifications
- Materials: Roughcast stone and brick Tiled roof

The Lumley Chapel is a redundant Anglican church in the suburban village of Cheam, in the London Borough of Sutton, England. It is recorded in the National Heritage List for England as a designated Grade II* listed building, and is under the care of the Churches Conservation Trust. The chapel is located in the churchyard of St Dunstan's Church in Church Road, off Malden Road, the A2043.

== History ==
The Archbishop of Canterbury acquired the manor of Cheam in 1018, and it is thought that the church was founded soon after this date. It was dedicated to Saint Dunstan, an earlier Archbishop of Canterbury. A south aisle was added to the church in the 12th century. In 1580 John Lumley, 1st Baron Lumley inherited the nearby Nonsuch Palace through his marriage to Jane Fitzalan, daughter of Henry FitzAlan, 19th Earl of Arundel. During the 1590s Lumley converted the church into a memorial chapel for himself and his two wives.

In the early 18th century the church consisted of a chancel with a south chapel, a nave with a south aisle, and a west tower. Later in the century, possibly in 1746, the south aisle and the south wall of the nave were demolished and replaced by a wider nave. At the same time a north aisle and a south porch were added. In 1864 a new church, also dedicated to St Dunstan, was built to the north. The older church was demolished, other than the east end of the chancel which was retained to contain the monuments and brasses from the old church. This remnant of the former church was declared redundant on 16 June 2002, and was vested in the Churches Conservation Trust on 1 August 2002.

== Architecture ==
The chapel is the oldest standing building in the London Borough of Sutton. It is constructed in partly roughcast rubble stone and brick. It has a tiled roof. The east window dates from the 15th century and has three lights. In the south wall is the blocked arcade that formerly led into the south chapel. In the north wall are fragments of a blocked window from the Saxon or the early Norman era. Inside the church the walls are plastered. Along the top of the north and south walls is a frieze decorated with fruit and foliage. Over this is a cornice, rising from which is a plastered barrel vault decorated with ribs and pendants.

== Memorials ==
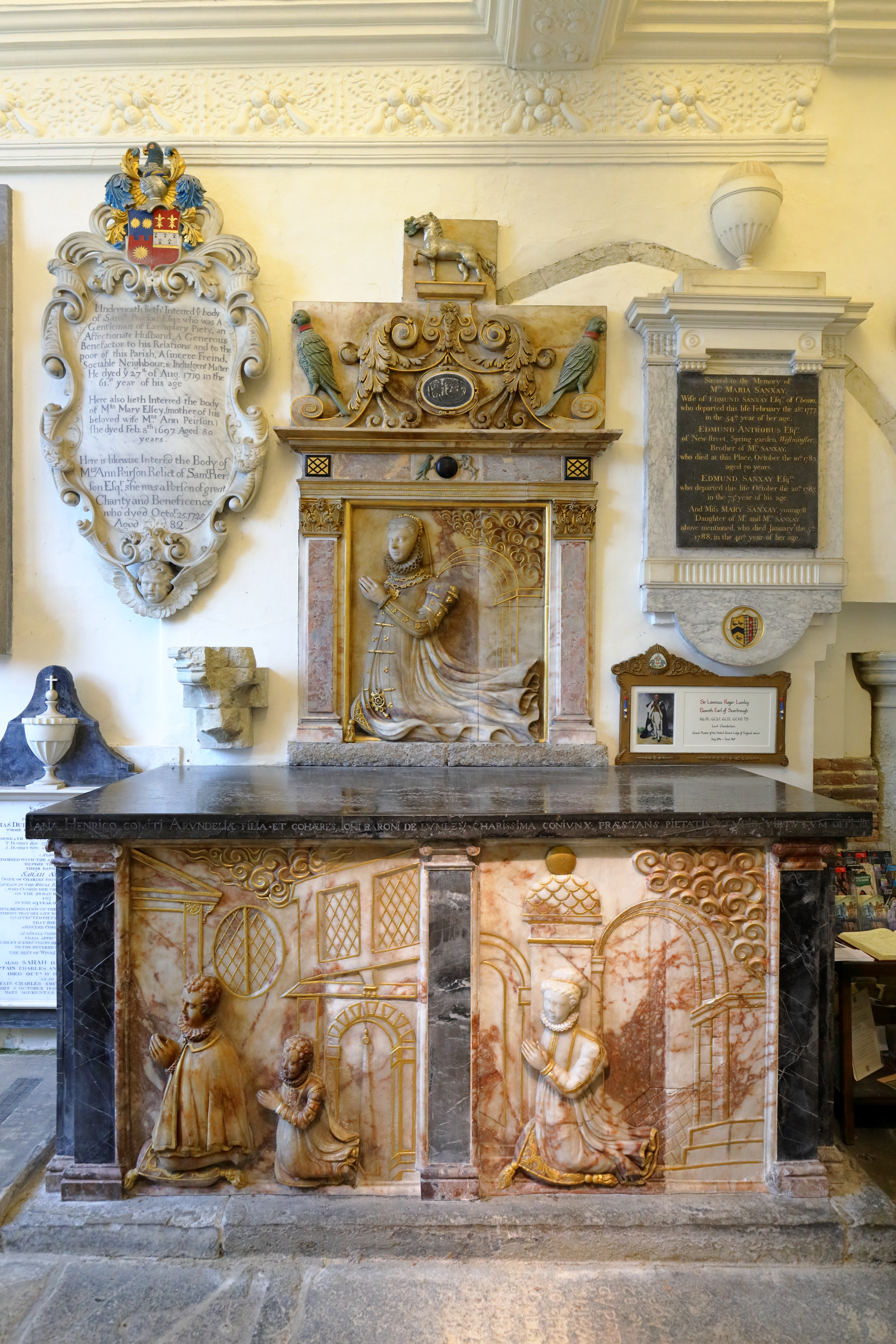
Monument to Jane Lumley

Inside the chapel are alabaster and marble monuments to John Lumley and his two wives, Lady Jane Fitzalan and Elizabeth Darcy. Lady Jane died in 1578; her tomb is decorated with family coats of arms and depictions of Jane's three children at prayer in the chapel of Nonsuch Palace. John Lumley died in 1609; his tomb is also decorated with heraldry. Elizabeth Darcy died in 1617. Her recumbent effigy lies on the tomb. Detailed preparatory coloured drawings of the three monuments, made in about 1590, appear in Lumley's Red Velvet Book.

Other memorials include those to the Pybus family of Cheam House, and the Antrobus family of Lower Cheam House. A mural monument exists in memory of the merchant, lawyer and philosopher James Boevey (1622–1696) and his third wife Margaretta (1638–1714). On the south wall is a tablet to Ann, the five-year-old daughter of Rev William Gilpin, headmaster of Cheam School. The brasses are dated between 1450 and 1632.

Amongst the brasses are those to the Yerde and Fromond family who held the manor of East Cheam. John Yerde, esq., married Dame Anne Courtenay who is believed to be the daughter of Hugh de Courtney, 4th Earl of Devon and his wife, Anne Talbot. Anne Courtenay's Arms on the brass shield clearly display her Courtenay connection to the Earls of Devon. Most of the brasses are now only fragments embedded into the floor but the shields and a small brass to John Yerde still exist, as does a brass rubbing dating from 1837 when the brass was still in its original form.

== Associated features ==
The currently active parish church of St Dunstan, designed by F. H. Pownall, is situated to the north of the chapel, and is also designated as a Grade II* listed building. The lychgate, dated 1891, at the entrance to the churchyard, is listed Grade II. In the churchyard are three tombs, each of which is Grade II listed.

== Gallery ==
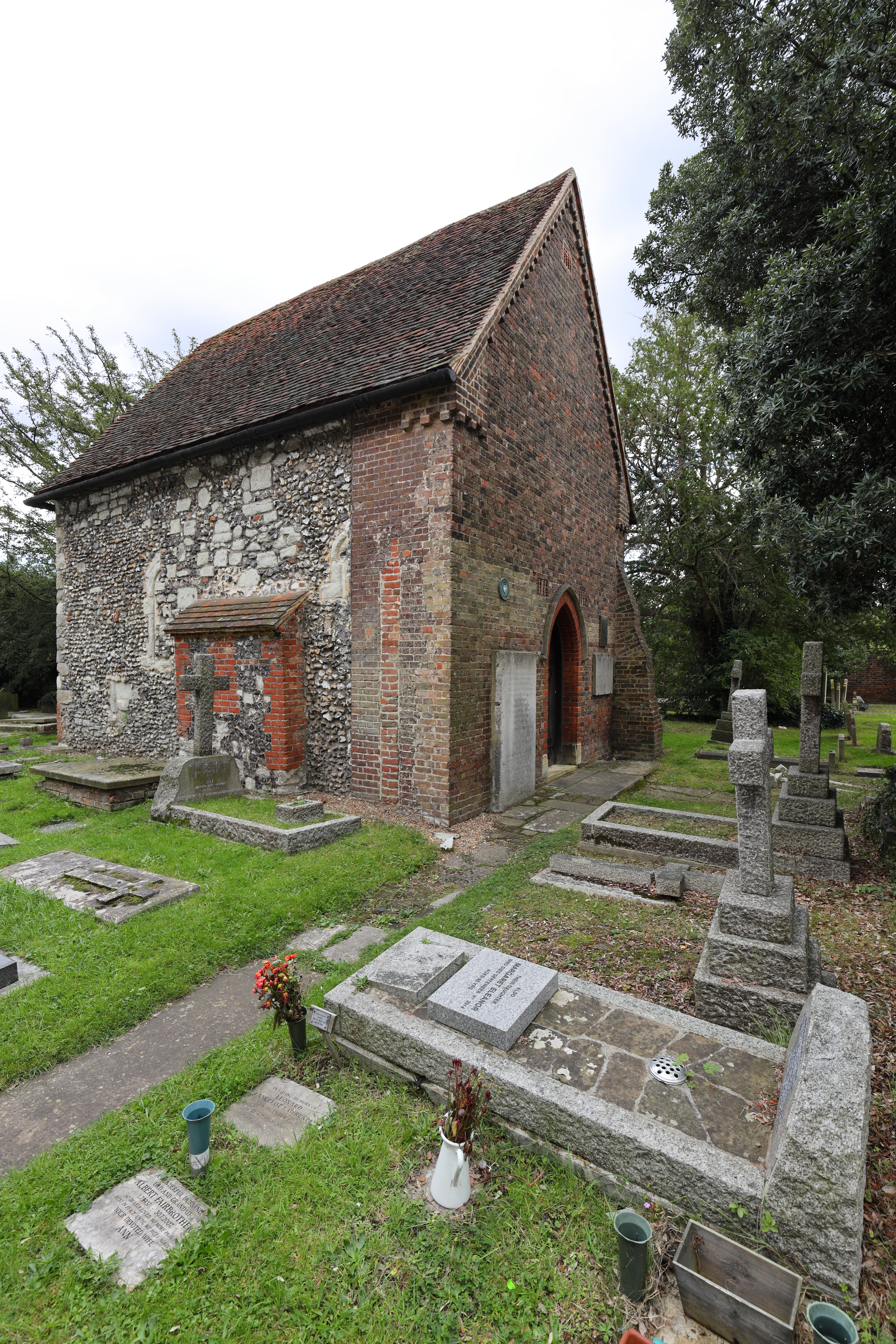
Exterior view of the entrance to the Lumley Chapel.

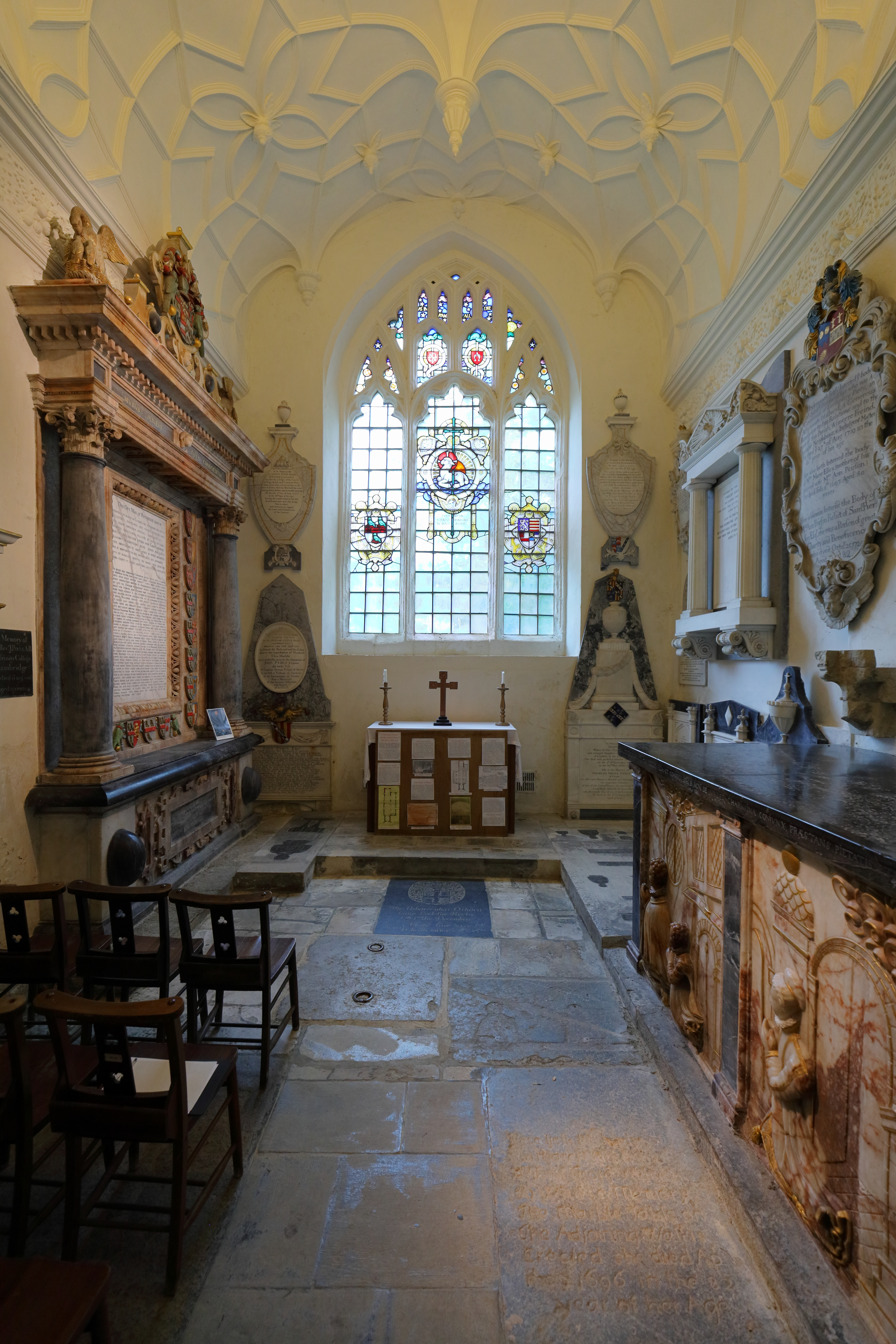
Interior view seen from the entrance.

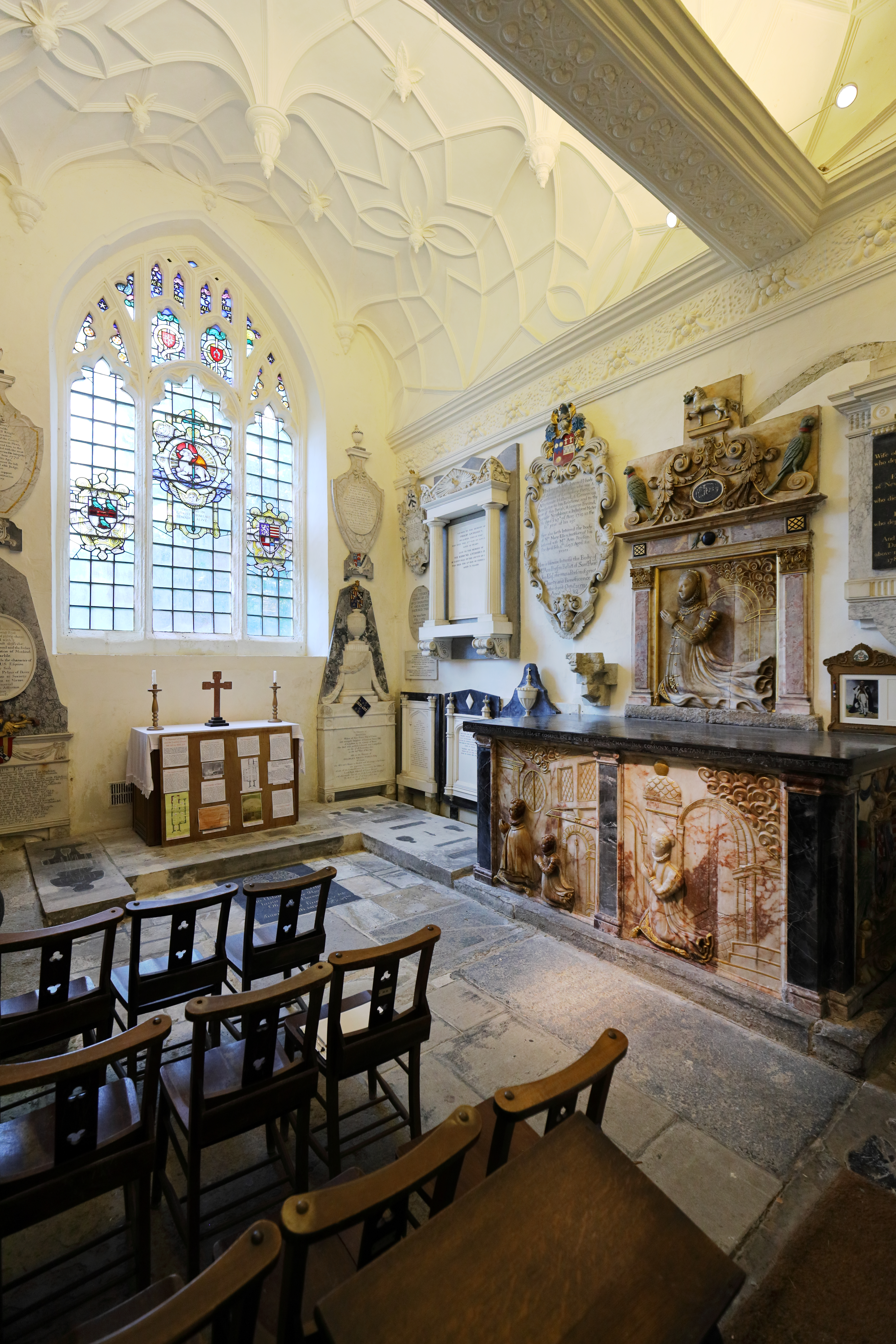
The window in the front wall, and the monument to Jane on the right wall.

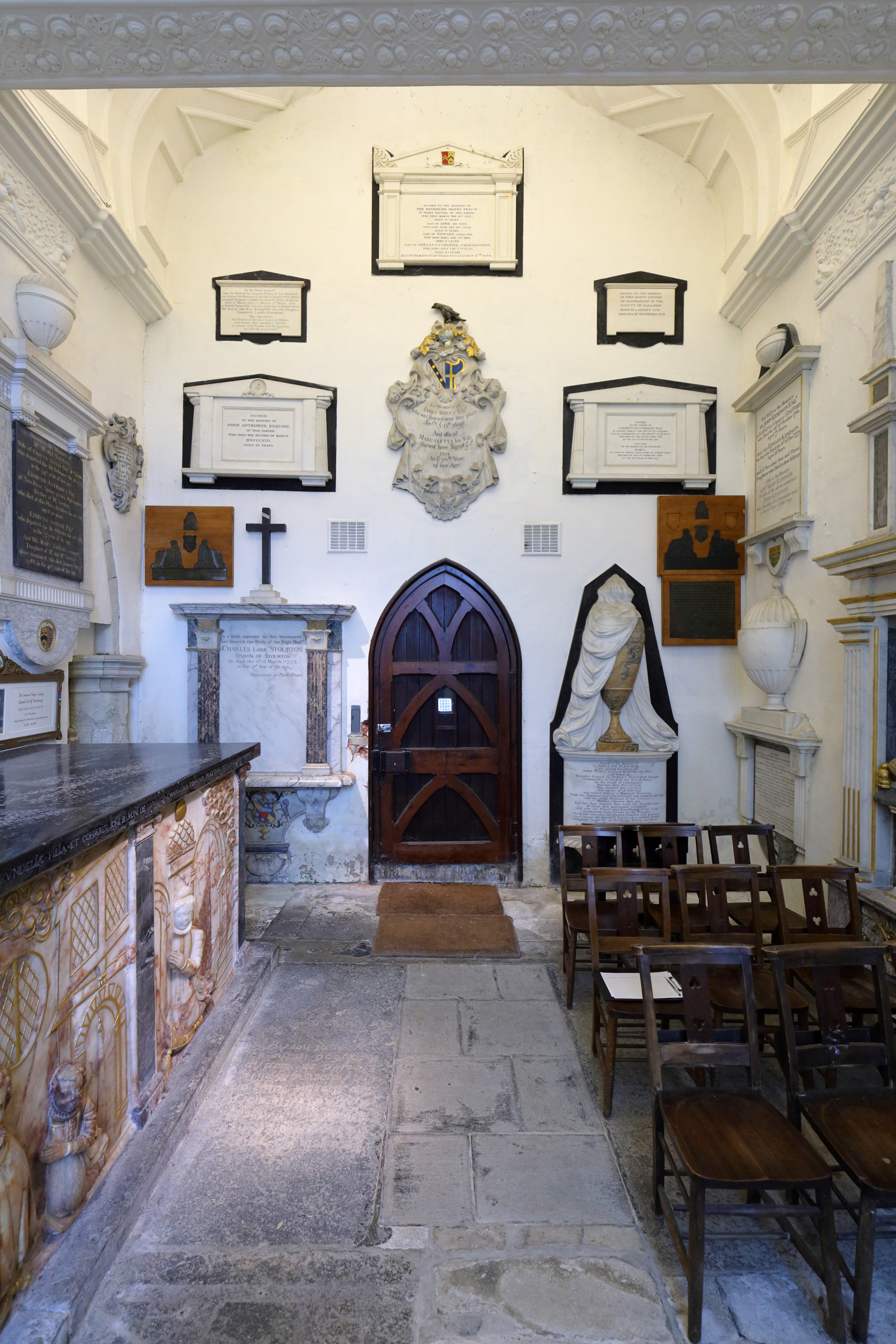
The rear wall with the entrance.

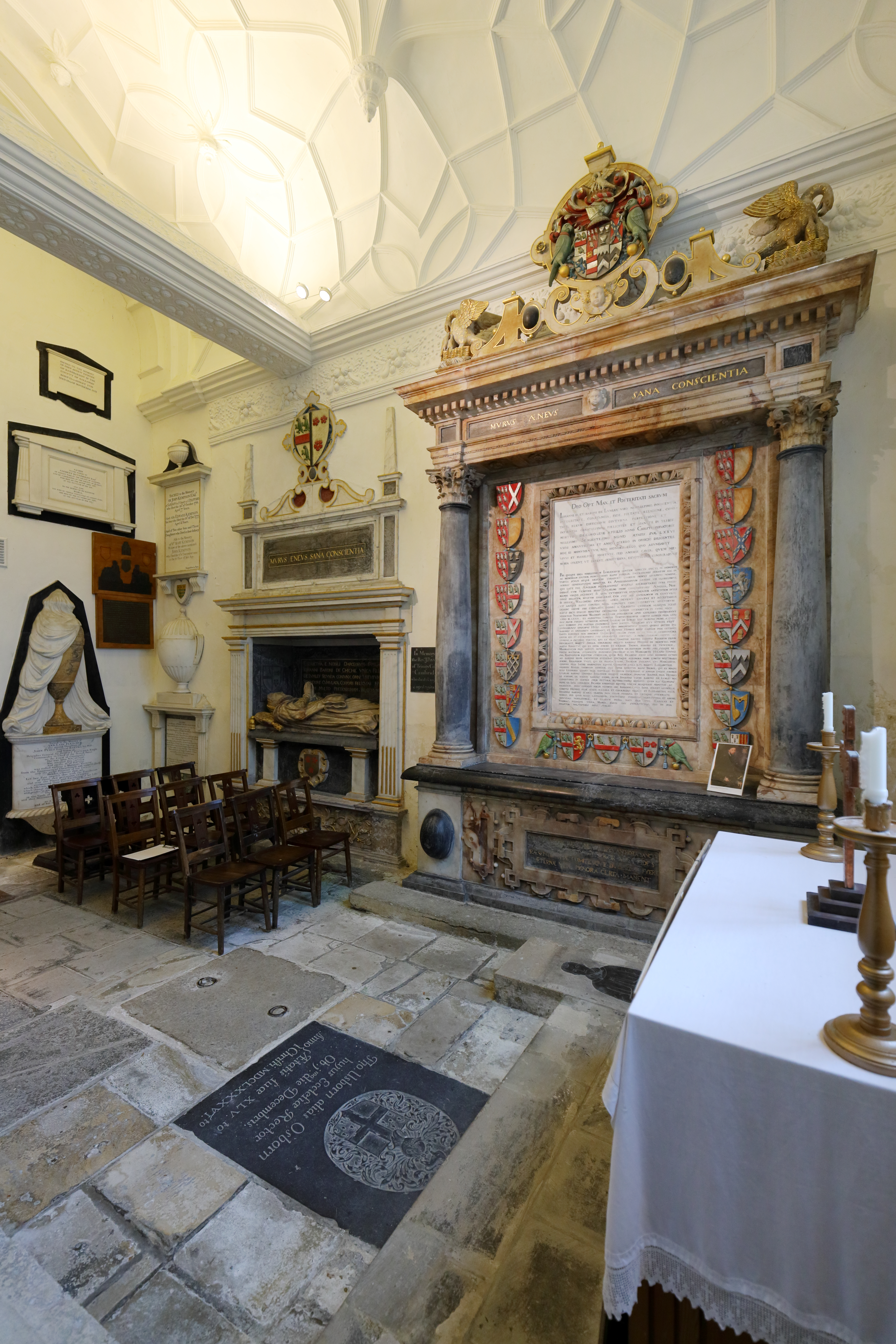
The left wall with monuments to Elizabeth and John.

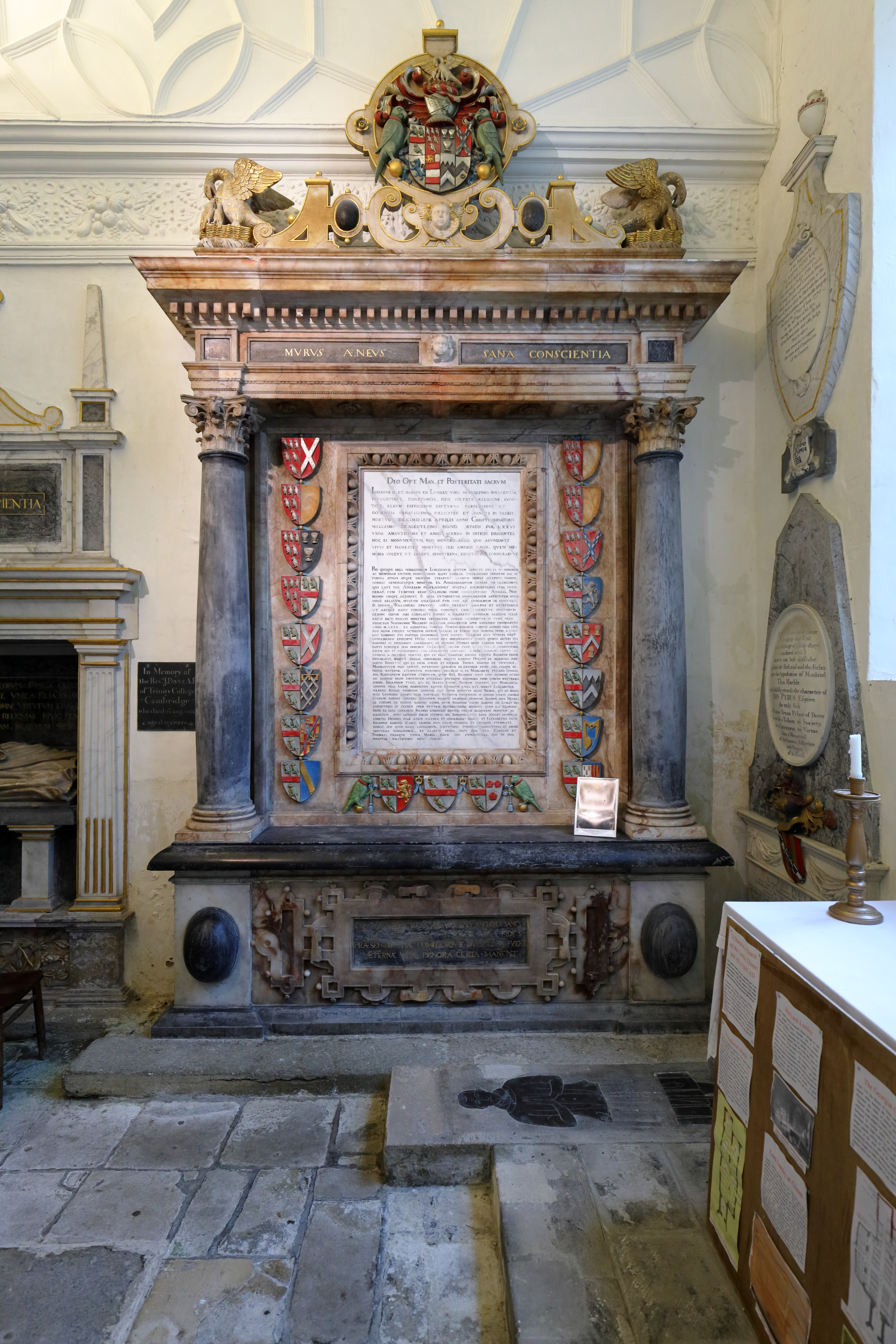
The monument to John in the front-left corner of the chapel.

== See also ==
- List of churches preserved by the Churches Conservation Trust in South East England
