= Nonsuch =

Nonsuch may refer to:

== Ships ==
- Nonsuch (1650 ship), the English ship that sailed into Hudson Bay in 1668–69
- Nonsuch (1781 ship), built in Calcutta to serve as a merchantman or warship
- Nonsuch (1794 ship), later renamed Vigilant, an American schooner
- USS Nonsuch (1813), a US warship from 1813
- Nonsuch (sailboat), a cat-rigged sailboat manufactured in Canada
- HMCS Nonsuch, a Canadian Naval Reserve division in Edmonton, Alberta
- HMS Nonsuch, name of several English and British warships

== Buildings in England ==
- Nonsuch House, a 1579 building on London Bridge
- Nonsuch Palace, an English royal palace built by Henry VIII in Surrey
- Nonsuch Mansion, a mansion in Nonsuch Park, London
- Nonsuch Estate, a country estate in Wiltshire built for Lord Digby 1800

== Places ==
- Nonsuch Bay, Antigua and Barbuda
- Nonsuch, County Westmeath, a townland in Mayne civil parish, barony of Fore, County Westmeath, Ireland
- Nonsuch Island, Bermuda, an island in, being restored to pre-colonial ecology
- Nonsuch Park, a public park in the London Borough of Sutton, part of the larger park associated with the palace
- Nonsuch, a village in Portland Parish, Jamaica

== Other ==
- Baron Nonsuch, a title in the Peerage of England created in 1670
- Nonsuch (album), an alternative rock album by British band XTC
- Nonsuch High School, a girls' Grammar school in Cheam, Surrey UK, near the park
- Nonsuch, a publishing imprint of The History Press
- HMS Nonsuch, a fictional ship in C.S. Forester's Horatio Hornblower novels; see The Commodore (Forester novel)#Ships
- Treaty of Nonsuch, a treaty made at the palace between England and the Dutch Republic in 1585
- Walker's Nonsuch, a toffee manufacturer headquartered in Stoke-on-Trent

== See also ==
- Nonesuch (disambiguation)
