= Catherina Boevey =

English philanthropist

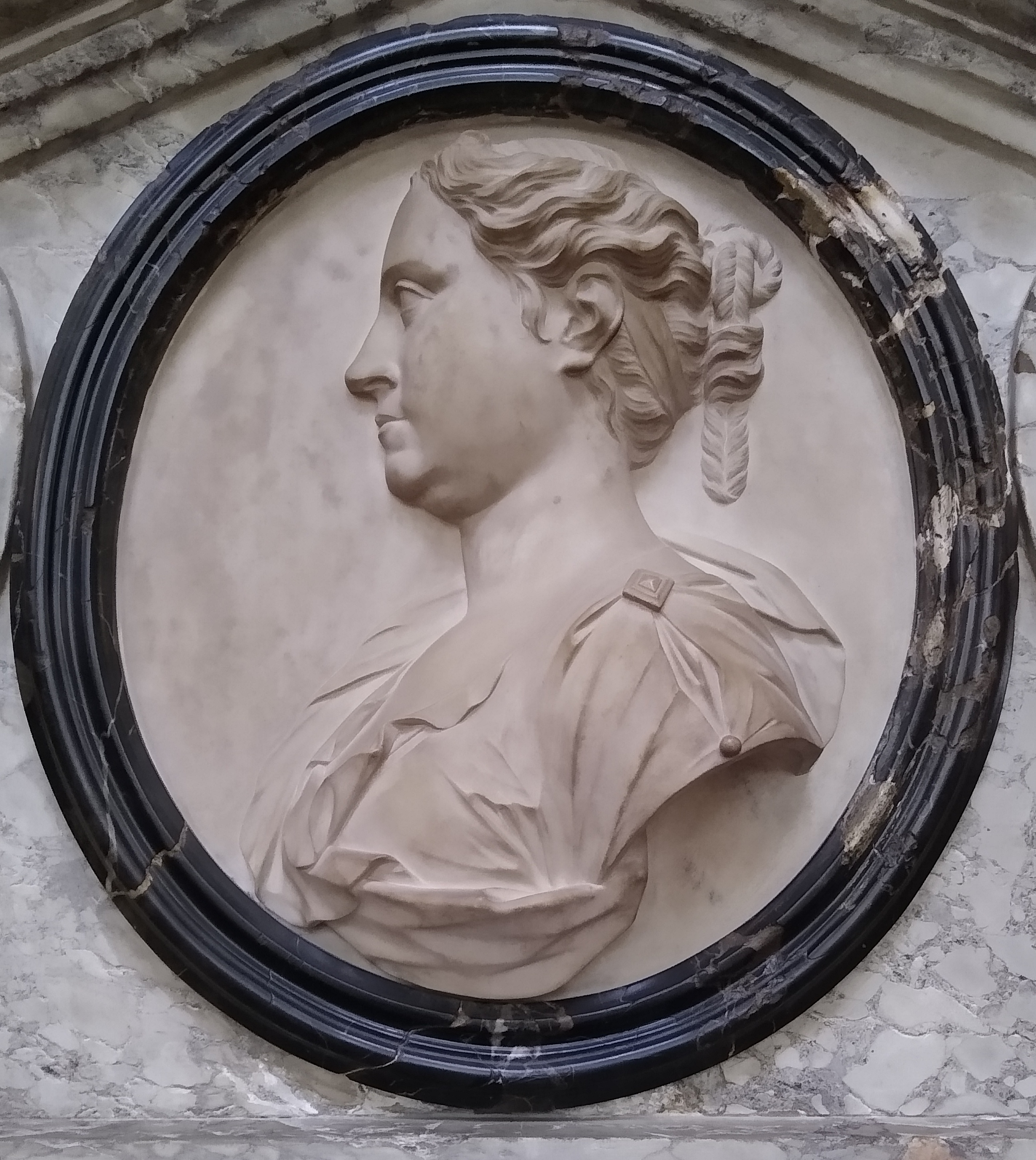
Depiction of Boevey in Westminster Abbey

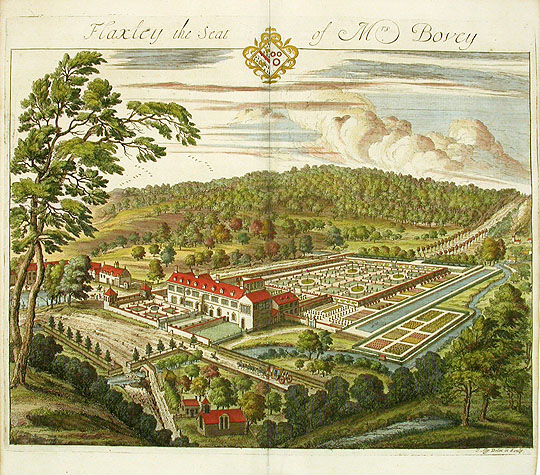
"Flaxley the seat of Mrs Bovey", contemporary engraving by Johannes Kip published in Robert Atkyns' "The Ancient & Present State of Gloucestershire" (1712). The armorials above show within a widow's lozenge escutcheon Boevey impaling Riches, the latter appearing as: Argent, three annulets gules. The arms of Riches of Kent are generally given however as Argent, three annulets azure and may have been here incorrectly tinted on the Kip print, published in monochrome

Catherina Boevey (1669–1726) (or Bovey, nee Riches) (pronounced "Boovey"), was a philanthropist.

== Origins ==
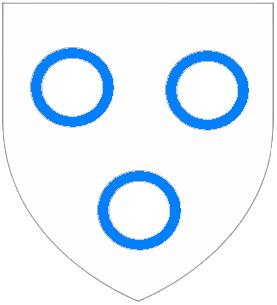
Armorials of Riches of Kent, per Heralds' Visitations to County of Kent (17th century): Argent, three annulets azure

Catherina was born in London in 1669, the daughter of John Riches (1628–1718) by his second wife Anne Davall, whom he had married in 1668, daughter of Thomas Davall, merchant of Amsterdam, by Anna Potts (b.1621, d.pre 1700), the daughter of Thomas (a.k.a. Abraham) Potts. Anna Davall (née Potts) mentions in her will dated 24 December 1688 her daughter Anna and her husband John Riches. Catherina's uncle was Sir Thomas Davall, knight, born at Amsterdam in 1644, attended Merchant Taylors' School and was knighted at Kensington Palace 19 June 1713. She had a brother John Riches (dvp.1676) and a sister Anne Riches (d.1689), whose monument exists at Flaxley. "Katharine the Daughter of John & Ann Riches" was baptised on 1 May 1670 at All Hallows Lombard Street, London. Riches was a wealthy merchant originally of Amsterdam who settled in the parish of St Laurence Pountney in London. He was member of the Grocers Company and a Common Councilman of Dowgate (1678–83, 1689) and a Deputy in 1685. He was a Churchwarden of St Laurence Pountney 1680-2. Politically he was assessed as a "good", i.e. reliable, Tory. Her mother is sometimes stated erroneously to have been a daughter of Sir Bernard de Gomme (d.1685), of Holland, Charles II's Military Engineer. De Gomme certainly bequeathed her sister Anna Riches (d.1689) (John Riches' daughter) £300 in his will and supported the denization of Anna Potts (1621-pre 1700), her grandmother, termed in his will "a native of Amsterdam".

== Appearance and character ==
Catharina was a great beauty. In The New Atalantis of 1709 by Delarivier Manley she is called Portia, in comparison to the Roman lady who lived 95–45 BC commended for her virtue in a funeral oration by Cicero. She is further described there as "One of those lofty, black, and lasting beauties that strike with reverence and yet delight". Catherine's personal qualities were praised by her contemporaries, Sir Richard Steele included, and her wit and urbanity were noted by Ballard who referred to her as having "great genius and good judgement", derived from her reading.

== Marriage ==
In 1684 aged 15 she was married to 17-year-old William Boevey (1667–1692), who in the previous year 1683 had inherited Flaxley Abbey, Gloucestershire, from his first cousin Abraham II Clark (1622–1683) who had died without surviving issue. William was the son of the merchant, lawyer and philosopher James Boevey (1622–1696) by his second wife Isabella de Visscher. Although he lived only to the age of 25, he was given to "excesses, both in debauch and ill-humour," bringing much suffering to his wife; she never complained, however, but supported it all "like a martyr, cheerful under her very sufferings". The short marriage was childless and Catherina remained a widow for the rest of her long life.

== Widowhood ==
In 1692, when Mrs. Boevey was only twenty-two, her husband died, leaving her mistress of his estate of Flaxley and as she was also the sole heiress of her wealthy father, she at once became the centre of a crowd of wooers; Mrs. Bovey would listen to none.

== Friendship with Mary Pope ==
By about 1686, aged 17, she had formed a strong friendship with Mrs. Mary Pope, daughter of John Pope, a Bristol merchant. Seeing ample scope for a life of active benefactions, Catherina associated Mrs. Pope with her in her philanthropic career. The modern era has ascribed a possible element of lesbianism into the close friendship between the two women.

== Philanthropic career ==
Catherina Boevey distributed to the poor, relieved prisoners, and taught the children of her neighbours. Her gifts, which included the purchase and donation of an estate to augment the income of Flaxley Church, a legacy to Bermuda, and bequests to two schools at Westminster, are listed on her monument in Flaxley Church. Particulars of her habits, and of how she dispensed her charities, appear in H. G. Nicholls's Forest of Dean, pp. 185 et seq.

== Publicly esteemed ==
In 1702 George Hickes, in the preface (p. xlvii) to Linguarum Septentrionalium Thesaurus, calls Mrs. Bovey "Angliæ nostræ Hypatia Christiana." In 1714, Steele prefixed an Epistle Dedicatory to her at the start of the second volume of the Ladies' Library. "Do not believe that I have many such as Portia to speak of," wrote the author of The New Atlantis (p. 212); and the repute of her happy ways and generous deeds had not died out in 1807, when Fosbroke in his "History of Gloucestershire" described her as "a very learned, most exemplary, and excellent woman".

== Death and burial ==
She died at Flaxley Hall on Saturday, 18 January 1726, and was buried "in a most private manner", according to her own directions (Gent. Mag. lxii. pt. ii. 703).

== Monuments ==
=== Physical ===
==== Westminster Abbey ====
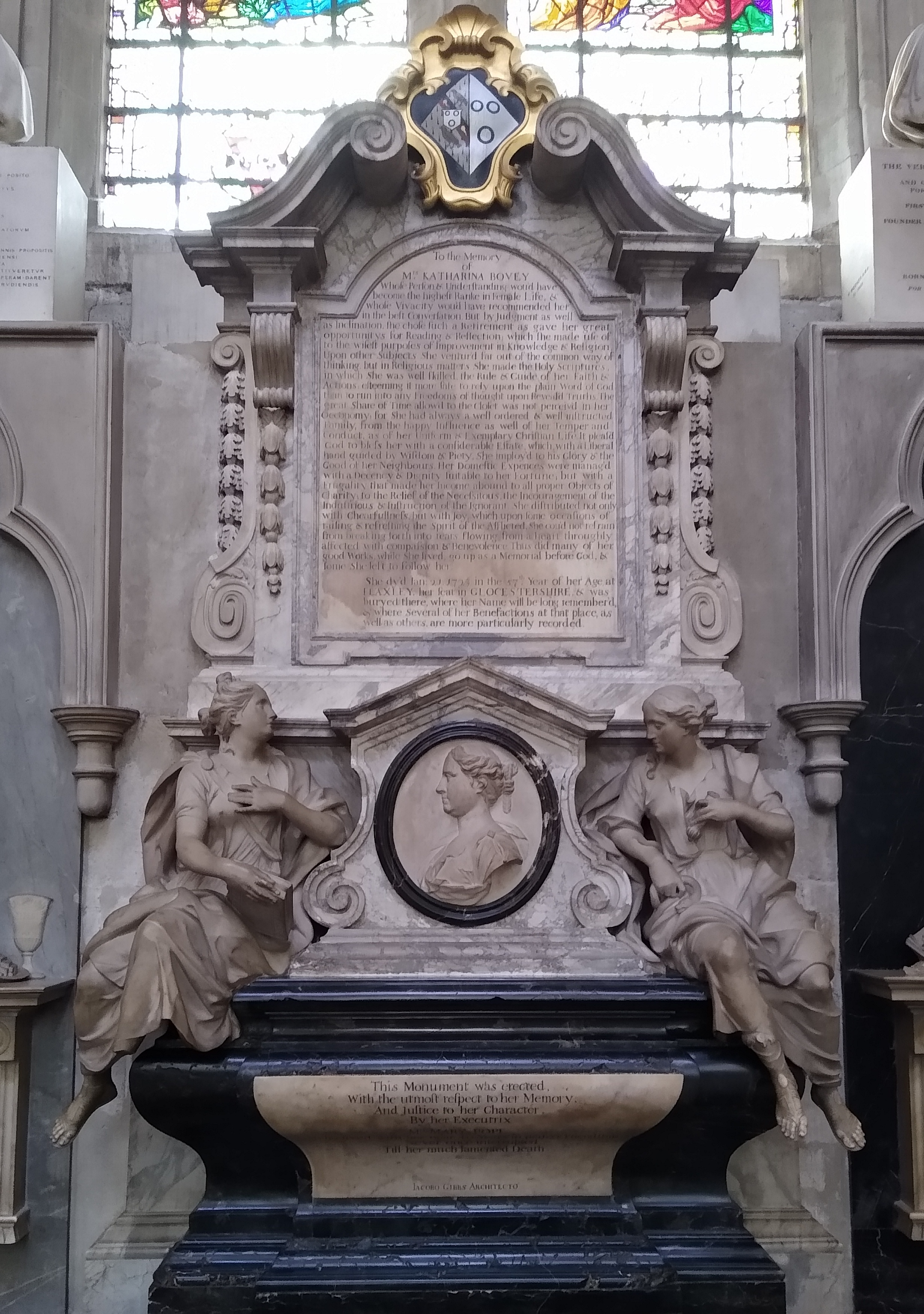
Monument to Katharina Bovey in Westminster Abbey

A now lost monument was erected to Mrs. Bovey in Westminster Abbey, by her friend Mrs. Pope, shortly after her death and survived certainly as late as 1750. Ballard who called it "a beautiful honorary marble monument", wrote to a friend asking him to copy the inscription for him, telling him it was on the north side. It is transcribed in Ballard's Ladies and in John Wilford's Memorials. There is however no mention of the monument or of Mrs. Boevey either in Mackenzie Walcott's Memorials of Westminster, (1851), or in Arthur Penrhyn Stanley's Westminster Abbey, (1882, 5th edition). The text was transcribed by Ralph Bigland in his "Historical, Monumental, and Genealogical Collections relative to the County of Gloucester" (1786–1794):

"To the Memory of Mrs. CATHARINA BOVEY, whose Person and Understanding would have become the highest Rank in Female Life, whose Vivacity would have recommended her in the best Conversation; but by Judgement, as well as Inclination, she chose such a Retirement as gave her great Opportunities in Reading and Reflection, which she made Use of to the wisest Purposes of Improvement in Knowledge and Religion. Upon other Subjects she Ventured far out of the common Way of thinking; but in Religious

Matters she made the Holy Scriptures, in which she was well skilled, the Rule and Guide of her Faith and Actions, esteeming it more fate to rely upon the plain Word of God, than to run into any Freedoms of Thought upon revealed Truths, the great Share of Time allowed to the Closet was not perceived in her Economy; for she had always a well ordered and well instructed Family, from the happy Influence, as well of her Temper and Conduct, as of her uniform and exemplary Christian Life. It pleased God to bless her with considerable Estate, which, with a liberal Hand, guided by Wisdom and Piety, she employed to his Glory, and the Good of her Neighbours. Her domestic expenses were managed with a Decency and Dignity suitable to her Fortune; but with a Frugality that made her Income abound to all proper Objects of Charity, to the Relief of the Necessitous, and Encouragement of the Industrious, and the Instruction of the Ignorant. She distributed not only with Cheerfulness, but with Joy, which, upon some occasions of raising and refreshing the Spirit of the Afflicted, she could not refrain from breaking forth into Tears, flowing from a Heart thoroughly affected with Compassion and Benevolence. Thus did many of her good Works, while she lived, go up as a Memorial before God; and some she left to follow her. She died 21 Jan. 1726, in the 57th Year of her Age at Flaxley, her seat in Gloucestershire, and was buried there, where her Name will be long remembered, and where several of her Benefactions at that Place, as well as others, are particularly recorded. This Monument was erected, with the utmost Respect to her Memory, and Justice to her Character, by her Executrix Mrs. MARY POPE, who lived with her near 40 Years in perfect Friendship, never once interrupted till her much lamented Death"

Appended below was the following memorial to Mary Pope:

"To the Memory of MARY POPE, Daughter of JOHN POPE, of Bristol, Merchant, the Friend of Mrs. BOVEY, and Partner of her Virtues, who, after a Life spent in exemplary Piety, and full of good Works, died 24 March, in the Year of our Lord 1746, aged 81 Years"

==== Flaxley Church ====
On a large plain tablet of white marble is inscribed the following text:

In the vault near this Chapel is reposited the Body of Mrs CATHARINA BOVEY, Daughter of JOHN RICHES, Esq. of London, Merchant. She was married to WILLIAM BOVEY, Esq. Lord of this Mannor of Flaxley, at the Age of 15, was left a Widow, without Children, at the Age of 22, and continued so all the rest of her Life. She entertained her Friends and Neighbours with a most agreeable Hospitality; but always took Care to have a large Reserve for Charity, which she bestowed, not only on such Occasions as offered, but studied how to employ it so as to make it useful and advantageous. Her Disposition to do good was so well known in the District about her, that she easily became acquainted with the Circumstances of those that wanted; and, as she preserved many Families from Ruin, by seasonable Loans or Gifts, so she conveyed her Assistance to some of better Rank, in such a Manner as made it doubly acceptable. How far her Bounty extended was known to herself alone; but much of it appeared, to her Honour and God`s Glory, in frequent Distributions to the Poor, and especially to the Charity Schools Round about the Country, in relieving those in Prison, and delivering many out of it, in contributing to the Churches of the English Establishment abroad, as well as aiding several at home, in cloathing and feeding her indigent Neighbours, and teaching their Children, some of whom every Sunday, by Turns, she entertained at her House, and condescended to examine them herself; besides this continual, it might be said this daily, Course of Liberality during her Life. She bequeathed at her Death, towards founding a College in the Island of Bermudas £500; to the Grey Coat Hospital, in St. Margaret`s, Westminster, £500; to the Blue Coat Hospital in Westminster, £500; to the Charity School of Christ Church, Parish of Southwark, £400; to augment the Living of this Place, £1200; to put out poor Children Apprentices, the Interest of £400 for ever; of which Summe £160 had been left by Mr. CLARKE and Mr. BOVEY; to be distributed, as her Executrix should think fit, among those whom she had put out Apprentices in her Life-time £400; lastly, she designed the re-building of this Chapel, which pious Design of hers was speedily

executed by Mrs. MARY POPE"

Also in Flaxley Church is a monument to her sister Anne inscribed:

"ANNE RICHES, Daughter of JOHN RICHES, Esq. and only sister to Mrs. BOVEY, of Flaxley, departed this Life 5 Oct. 1689, which she had passed

in a religious Observance of her Duty towards God and her Parents; in tender Affection to her Relations; in Charity and Kindness to all; endued with this early Habit of Vertue, Death, however suddain, did not surprise her unprepared"

=== Literary ===
Mrs Boevey is widely believed to be the model of Sir Richard Steele "The Peverse Widow" who was wooed by Sir Roger de Coverley, published in The Spectator in 1711.

== Buildings & landscapes ==
Boevy was a close friend of Maynard I Colchester, who lived near Flaxley, and her own canal garden may have influenced the Dutch-style of his Westbury Court Garden. The layout of the gardens and improvements to Flaxley Abbey were continued by her after her husband's death. However, due to the modification of the land, the Dutch-style gardens at Flaxley Abbey were eventually removed. The chapel, dedicated to St. Mary the Virgin, was extended by Mary Pope funded by a bequest in her will. In 1856 the nearby church replaced Boevey's refurbishment of the chapel at the Abbey's gate.

== Sources ==
This article incorporates text from a publication now in the public domain: "Bovey, Catharina". Dictionary of National Biography. London: Smith, Elder & Co. 1885–1900.

- Agnew, David C.A., Protestant Exiles from France in the Reign of Louis XIV, or, The Huguenot Refugees and their Descendants in Great Britain and Ireland, Vol.3, London, 1874, pp.78–9
