= Whitehall, Cheam =

Coordinates: 51.3600°N 0.2178°W

Whitehall
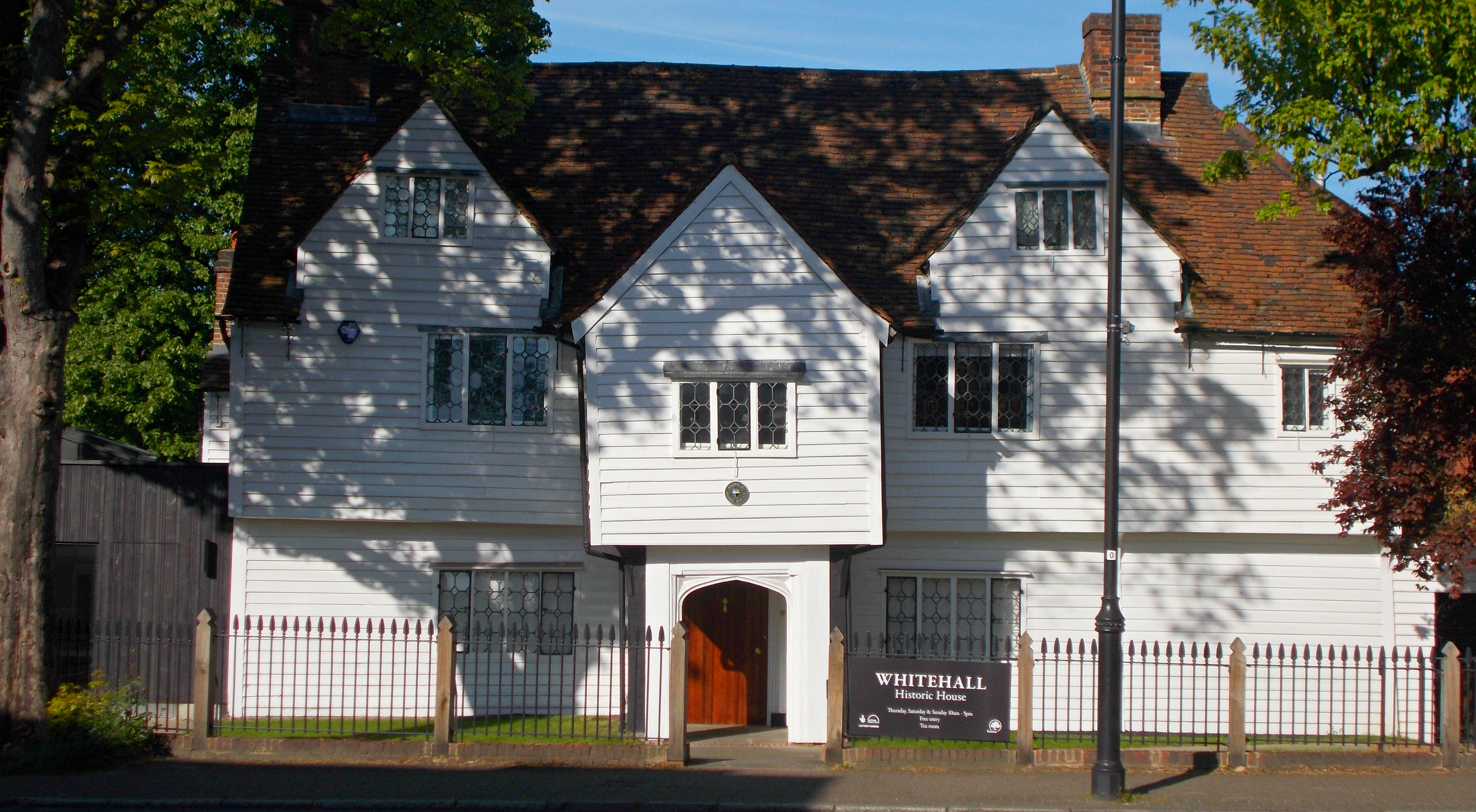
- Whitehall in Cheam
- Location: Cheam, London Borough of Sutton
- Type: Historic house museum
- Public transit access: Cheam
- Website: Sutton Library Whitehall Historic House website

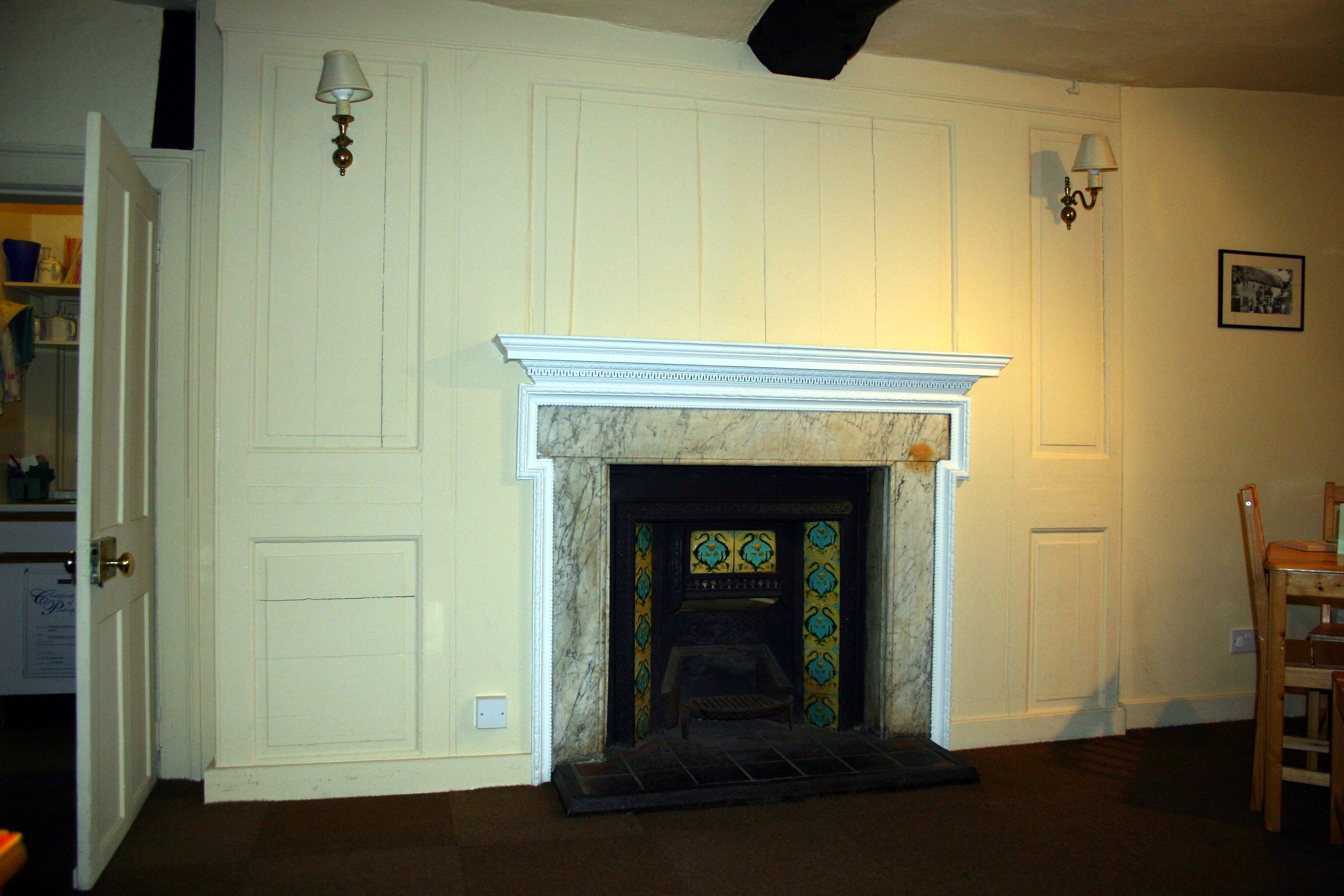
The tea room

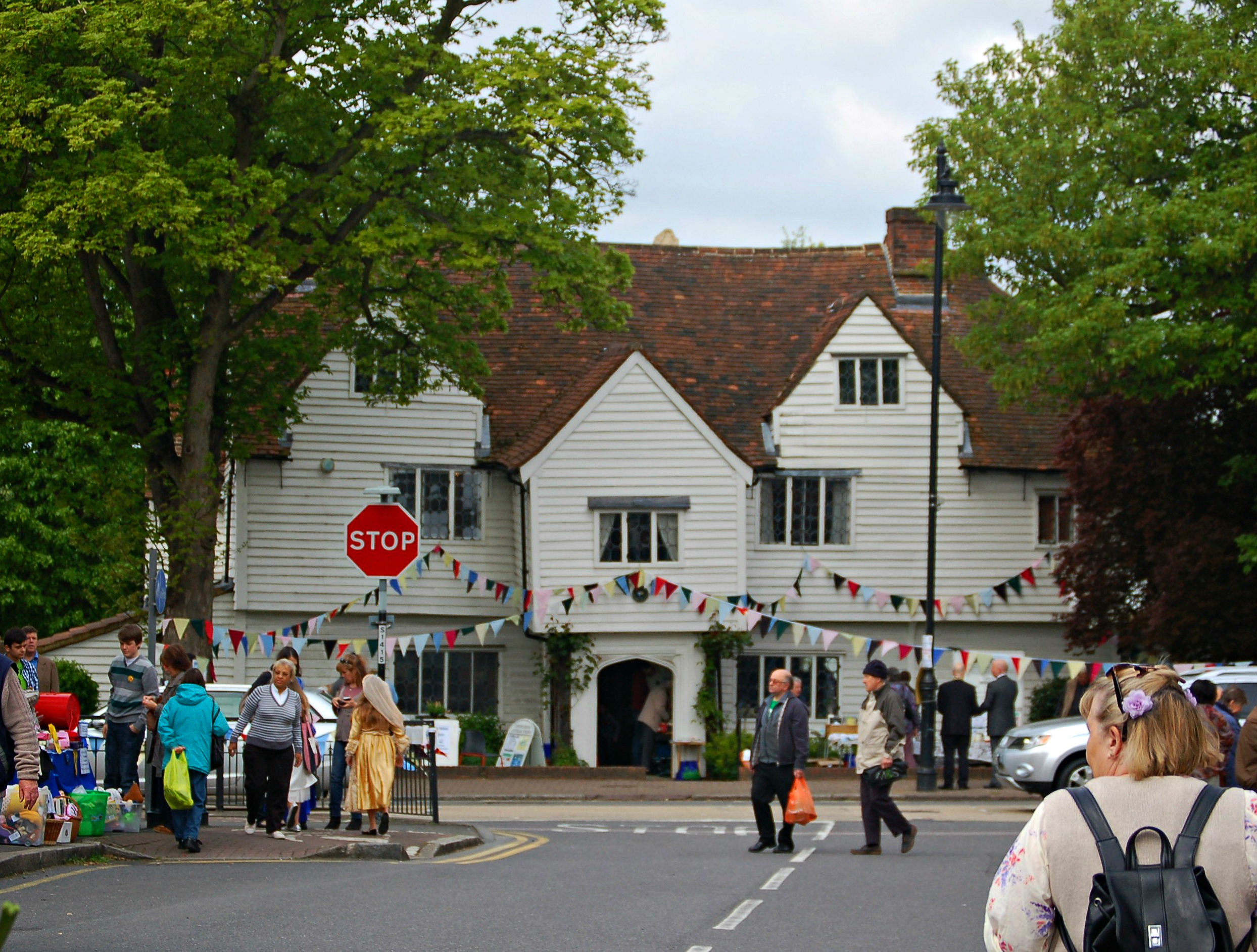
Whitehall during Cheam Charter Fair in May

Whitehall is a timber-framed historic house museum in the centre of Cheam Village, Sutton, Greater London. It is thought to have been a wattle and daub yeoman farmer's house originally, built around 1500. It is Grade II* listed on Historic England's National Heritage List.

== Features ==
The house contains details from the Georgian, Victorian and Edwardian eras. The rooms include the hall, the parlour (thought to have once been the original kitchen), the lower kitchen, the porch room, the Roy Smith art gallery (once a wash room or scullery), the Harriet Killick dressing room and the bedroom. One room has a display about Nonsuch Palace, built nearby by Henry VIII and pulled down in the 1680s. In the garden there is a medieval well which served an earlier building on the site.

== History ==
It is said once to have been called "The Council House," owing to its use by Elizabeth I, for holding an impromptu council meeting for signing papers while on a hunting expedition from Nonsuch Palace.

The oldest private school in the country, the Cheam School, was founded at Whitehall in Cheam in 1645.

== Ownership ==
It is believed that the house was the residence of the merchant, lawyer and philosopher, James Boevey (1622–1696), from c. 1670 to his death.

Between 1741 and 1963 Whitehall was home of the Killick family, and in 1816 birthplace to Captain James Killick who became Captain of the tea clipper Challenger and founded the firm Killick Martin & Company.

The house was bought by the borough in 1963 and following restoration, it was opened to the public as a historic building in 1978, and is run by the London Borough of Sutton and the Friends of Whitehall.

The museum closed in 2016 for a £1.6m refurbishment of the building. It reopened in June 2018 with improved facilities. Jill Whitehead, chair of the council's environment and neighbourhood committee, said: "The redevelopment of the Whitehall Museum is of major significance to the borough as it is one of our oldest and most historic buildings."
