= John Lumley, 1st Baron Lumley =

English aristocrat and art collector (c. 1533–1609)

John Lumley
- 1st Baron Lumley
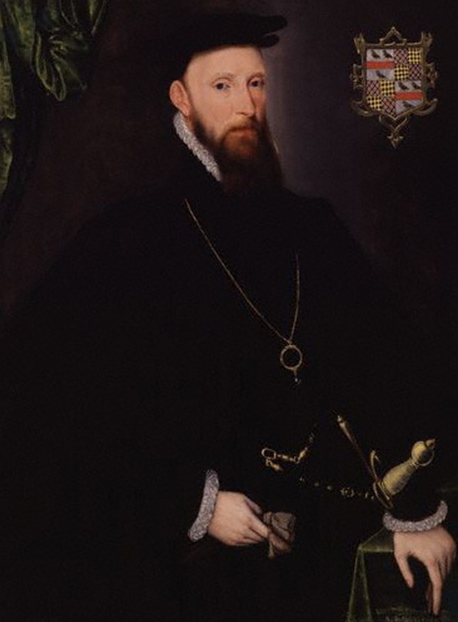
- Born: c. 1533
- Died: 11 April 1609 (aged c. 76)
- Spouses: Lady Jane FitzAlan (m. 1550; died 1578) Elizabeth Darcy (aft. 1578-1609)

John Lumley, 1st Baron Lumley, KB (c. 1533 – 1609) was an English aristocrat, who is remembered as one of the greatest collectors of art and books of his age.

== Early life ==
John Lumley, born about 1533, was the grandson and heir of John, Lord Lumley. He was the only son of George Lumley (who had been executed in the lifetime of his father for his role in the Pilgrimage of Grace), by Jane, second daughter and coheir of Sir Richard Knightley of Upton, Northamptonshire.

In a petition to Edward VI Lumley stated that he was a child at the death of his grandfather in 1544, to whose honours he did not succeed because of his own father's attainder, and in 1547 he obtained an Act of Parliament restoring him in blood, and enacting "that he, the said John Lumley and the heirs male of his body, should have hold, enjoy and bear the name, dignity, state and pre-eminence of a Baron of the Realm" whereby he became Baron Lumley (a new Barony being created of that name, in tail male ) and he was summoned to Parliament accordingly from 5 October 1553 to 5 November 1605.

He was made Knight of the Bath on 29 November 1553, and attended at the subsequent coronation of Mary I. He also served as a Commissioner of Claims at the coronations of Elizabeth I and James I.

He was suspected of treasonable dealings with Mary, Queen of Scots, and was imprisoned in 1570 along with the Earl of Arundel, his father-in-law. In October 1586 he was one of the judges at the trial of Mary, Queen of Scots, and also in 1602 of the trial of Robert Devereux, 2nd Earl of Essex.

== Marriages ==
Lumley married firstly, before the end of 1550, Lady Jane FitzAlan, the elder of the two daughters and co-heirs of Henry FitzAlan, 19th Earl of Arundel, by his first wife Lady Catherine Grey, daughter of Thomas Grey, 2nd Marquess of Dorset. Jane Lumley was one of the six principal ladies who sat in the third chariot of state at the coronation of Mary I in 1553. She was buried 9 March 1576/77, at Cheam, Surrey (as were three of her children, all of whom died in infancy), near her father's estate, Nonsuch Palace.

Lumley married secondly, Elizabeth Darcy, daughter of John Darcy, 2nd Baron Darcy of Chiche, by Frances, daughter of Richard Rich, 1st Baron Rich. Elizabeth survived her husband by 10 years and was buried 4 February 1616/7 at Cheam.

== Custodian of Nonsuch Palace ==
Lumley's seat was Lumley Castle in County Durham. However Queen Mary had sold the Palace of Nonsuch to Henry FitzAlan, 19th Earl of Arundel in 1556, and Lumley inherited it from his father-in-law in 1580. During his tenure, Lumley developed a major garden at Nonsuch.

Between 1590 and 1592, Lumley remitted to Queen Elizabeth I possession of Nonsuch, and so after 36 years, it again became a royal palace. When the palace passed to Queen Elizabeth, an inventory of Lumley's goods was prepared. Lumley stayed on at Nonsuch as Keeper of the Palace. On his death in 1609 he willed his library to Henry Stuart, the oldest son of James I and it became a significant addition to the Old Royal Library – which eventually became the basis of the British Library.

== Lumleian Lectures ==
With Richard Caldwell, Lord Lumley endowed a series of lectures, known as the Lumleian Lectures, starting in 1582 and still being given today. Initially they were about anatomy and surgery, with the purpose of "spreading light" and increasing the general knowledge of anatomy throughout England, but today they are on general medicine.

Initially plans were for a full anatomy course based on weekly lectures, but by 1616 there were three lectures per year. The work of William Harvey on the circulation of the blood was first announced by Harvey in the Lumleian Lecture for 1616.

Today the lecture is given once a year, organised by the Royal College of Physicians of London.

== Death ==
John Lumley died 11 April 1609, aged 76, without any surviving children. He died at his house in London by St Olave's and was buried at Cheam.

At his death the Barony of Lumley (created 1547) became extinct. He was buried at Cheam with his first wife; a tomb and monument there at St. Dunstan's Church memorialize Lumley and his two wives. The composer John Bull wrote one of his greatest works to Lumley's memory, contained in the Fitzwilliam Virginal Book, (Pavan and Galliard Lord Lumley). In his will dated 28 January 1606 and probated in 1609, Lumley settled the bulk of his estate on his cousin and heir male, Richard Lumley, 1st Viscount Lumley.

== See also ==
- Lumley inventories — of John Lumley's collections.
