= Nonsuch Palace =

Tudor royal palace

Coordinates: 51°21′16″N 00°14′18″W

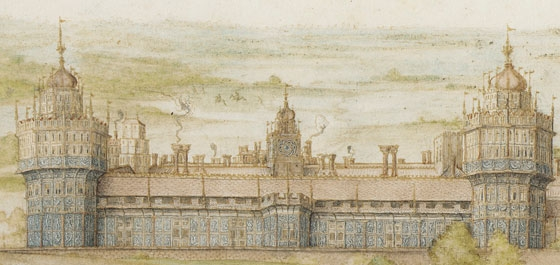
Detail of Georg Hoefnagel's 1568 watercolour of the south frontage of Nonsuch Palace

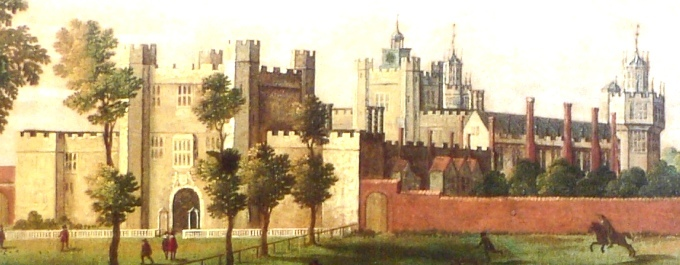
An early 17th-century depiction of Nonsuch Palace

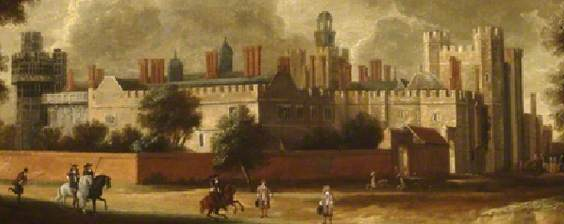
Detail of Nonsuch Palace from the North East, circa 1666–1679, attributed to Hendrick Danckerts

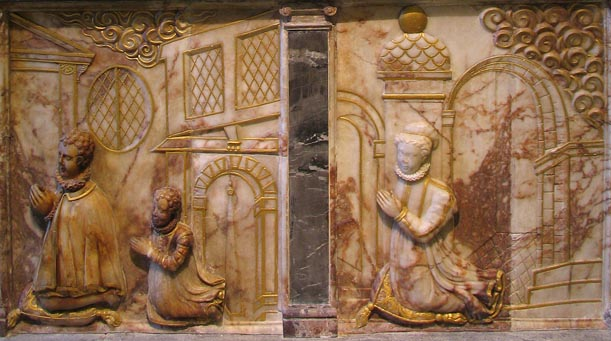
These reliefs in the Lumley Chapel in nearby Cheam are believed to be the only surviving depictions of the Nonsuch Palace interiors.

Nonsuch Palace /ˈnʌnˌsʌtʃ/ was a Tudor royal palace, commissioned by Henry VIII in Surrey, England, and on which work began in 1538. Its site lies in what is now Nonsuch Park on the boundary of the borough of Epsom and Ewell (in Surrey) and the London Borough of Sutton.

The palace was designed to be a celebration of the power and the grandeur of the House of Tudor, built to rival Francis I's Château de Chambord. Unlike most of Henry's palaces, Nonsuch was not an adaptation of an old building; he chose to build a new palace in this location because it was near to one of his main hunting grounds. However, the choice of location was unwise, for there was no nearby supply of water suitable for domestic use.

The palace remained standing until 1682–3, when it was pulled down by Barbara, Countess of Castlemaine, mistress to Charles II, to sell off building materials to pay for her gambling debts.

== Building ==
Nonsuch Palace, near Cheam, Greater London, was perhaps the grandest of Henry VIII's building projects. It was built on the site of Cuddington, near Ewell, the church and village having been destroyed and compensation paid, to create a suitable site. Work started on 22 April 1538, the first day of Henry's thirtieth regnal year, and six months after the birth of his son, later Edward VI.

Within two months the name "Nonsuch" appears in the building accounts, its name a boast that there was no such palace elsewhere equal to it in magnificence. Construction had been substantially carried out by 1541, but it took several more years to complete. As the Royal Household took possession of vast tracts of surrounding acreage, several major roads were re-routed or by-passed to circumvent what became Nonsuch Great Park.

== Later history ==
The palace was incomplete when Henry VIII died in 1547. Queen Mary I invited the French ambassador Antoine de Noailles to hunt deer in the park with greyhounds. In 1556, she sold the palace to Henry FitzAlan, 19th Earl of Arundel, who completed it by 1559. In 1585, the Treaty of Nonsuch was signed by Elizabeth I and the Dutch Republic at the palace. After Arundel's death in 1580, his son-in-law, John Lumley, 1st Baron Lumley, sold the palace back to Elizabeth I and the Crown in 1590–1592, in exchange for lands valued at £534.

Upon the death of Elizabeth I in 1603, the palace was inherited by her successor, James I.

Nonsuch Palace came to Anne of Denmark as her jointure property as the consort of King James I. The royal Prince Henry and Princess Elizabeth, the future "Winter Queen" of Bohemia, were lodged at Nonsuch for a time in 1603. The Great Park remained the property of Lord Lumley until he surrendered the lease to the queen in 1605. She rarely visited, but came in July 1617 attended by Viscount Lisle, Lucy, Countess of Bedford, and the Earls of Southampton and Montgomery.

Under King James I, Viscount Lumley was appointed Keeper of the Palace and Little Park. Lumley paid the gardeners and weeders from his yearly fee. In 1606, the Earl of Worcester succeeded him. He was paid £600 to build a new lodge in the Great Park, known as "Worcester House". Both James I and Charles I regularly visited for hunting and racing.

Following Parliament's victory in the English Civil War, the Nonsuch estate was confiscated and lent to a series of Parliamentarian supporters: first to Algernon Sidney, then to Colonel Robert Lilburne. The estate was then sold to Major-General John Lambert, and latterly to General Thomas Pride, who held it until his death in 1658.

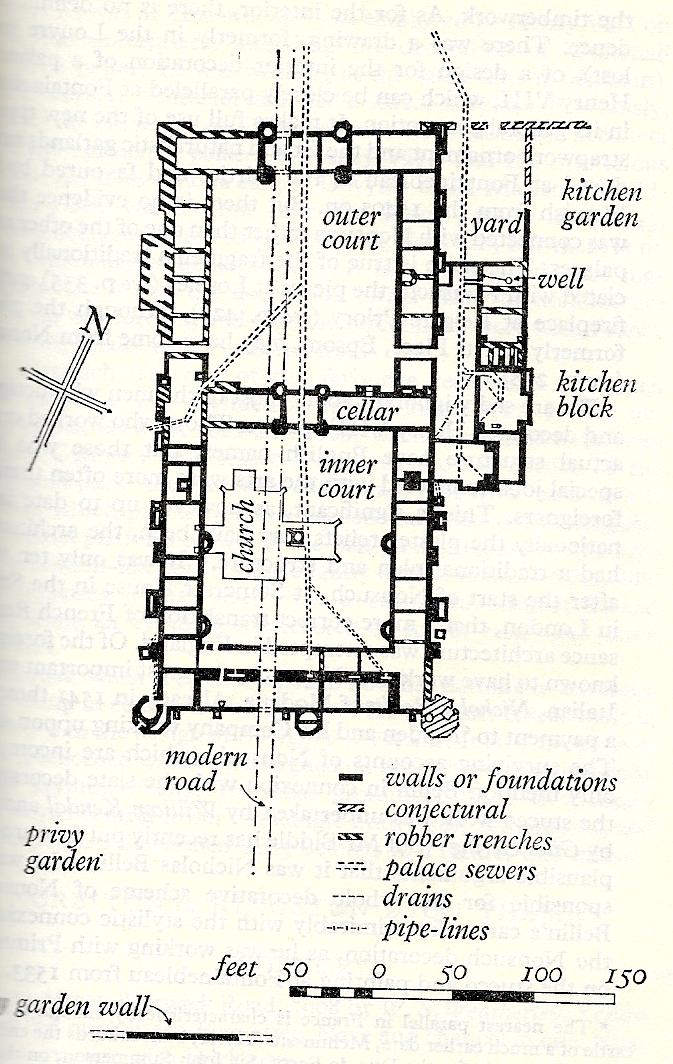
Detail of the floorplan for the palace, as it appears in Pevsner's The Buildings of England

The palace was handed back to the Crown after the Restoration in 1660, with the palace given to Queen Henrietta Maria and the park and Worcester House leased to Sir Robert Long. John Evelyn visited it in 1666 and reported:

I ... took an exact view of the plaster statues and bass-relievos inserted betwixt the timbers and punchceons of the outside walls of the Court; which must needs have been the work of some celebrated Italian. I much admired how they had lasted so well and entire since the time of Henry VIII., exposed as they are to the air; and pity it is they are not taken out and preserved in some dry place; a gallery would become them. There are some mezzo-relievos as big as the life; the story is of the Heathen Gods, emblems, compartments, &c. The palace consists of two courts, of which the first is of stone, castle like, by the Lord Lumleys (of whom it was purchased), the other of timber, a Gothic fabric, but these walls incomparably beautified. I observed that the appearing timber-puncheons, entrelices, &c., were all so covered with scales of slate, that it seemed carved in the wood and painted, the slate fastened on the timber in pretty figures, that has, like a coat of armour, preserved it from rotting. There stand in the garden two handsome stone pyramids, and the avenue planted with rows of fair elms, but the rest of these goodly trees, both of this and of Worcester Park adjoining, were felled by those destructive and avaricious rebels in the late war, which defaced one of the stateliest seats his Majesty had.

Nonsuch remained royal property until 1670, when Charles II gave it to his mistress, Barbara, Countess of Castlemaine, with the title Baroness of Nonsuch. She had it pulled down around 1682–3 and sold off the building materials to pay her gambling debts.

Some elements were incorporated into other buildings; for example the wood panelling can still be seen today in the Great Hall at Loseley Park near Guildford. No trace of the palace remains on its site today, but some pieces are held by the British Museum. There are two discernible rises of land on The Avenue that mark the position of the Outer and Inner Gatehouse. Nonsuch Palace should not be confused with Nonsuch Mansion, which is at the east of the park, nor its associated banqueting hall whose foundations are still visible to the south east of the palace site.

The palace cost at least £24,000 (equivalent to £11,100,000 in 2025) because of its rich ornamentation and is considered a key work in the introduction of elements of Renaissance design to England.

== Archaeology ==
Only about three contemporary images of the palace survive, and they do not reveal very much about either the layout or the details of the building. Following the digging of the trenches in the Second World War, it was reported that pieces of pottery had been discovered in the area, later found to be from the site of the palace. An outline of the site layout was also visible from the air, providing additional evidence in the search for the location of the site.

The site was excavated in 1959–60; the plan of the palace was quite simple with inner and outer courtyards, each with a fortified gatehouse. The exterior and outer courtyard were quite plain, but the inner courtyard was decorated with breathtaking stucco panels moulded in high relief. To the north, it was fortified in a medieval style, but the southern face had ornate Renaissance decoration, with tall octagonal towers at each end. It was within one of these towers that the premiere of Thomas Tallis' masterwork, Spem in alium, was perhaps performed. The 1959 excavation of Nonsuch by Martin Biddle, aged 22, was a key event in the history of archaeology in the UK. It was one of the first post-medieval sites to be excavated, and attracted over 75,000 visitors during the work. This excavation led to major developments in post-medieval archaeology.

== Gardens ==
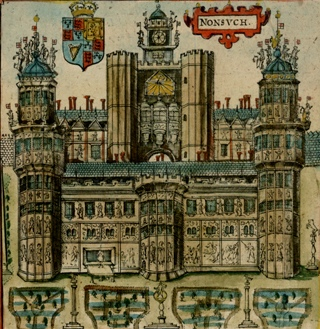
John Speed's 1610 map of Surrey also shows the palace's gardens with the principal ornaments.

John Speed's map of Surrey has an insert depicting the palace and a part of its gardens, including some of the principal ornaments. These are also known from detailed drawings in the "Red Velvet Book", the 1590 Lumley inventory.

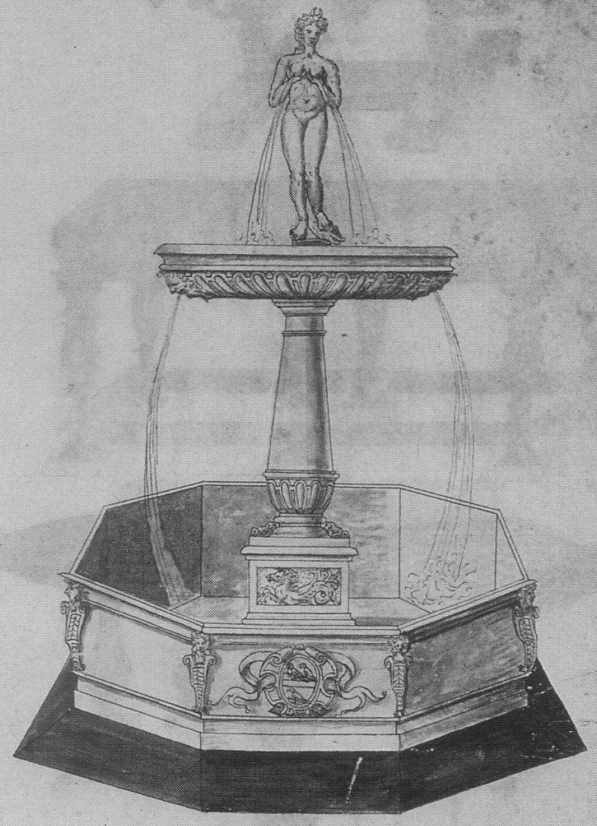
Diana Fountain

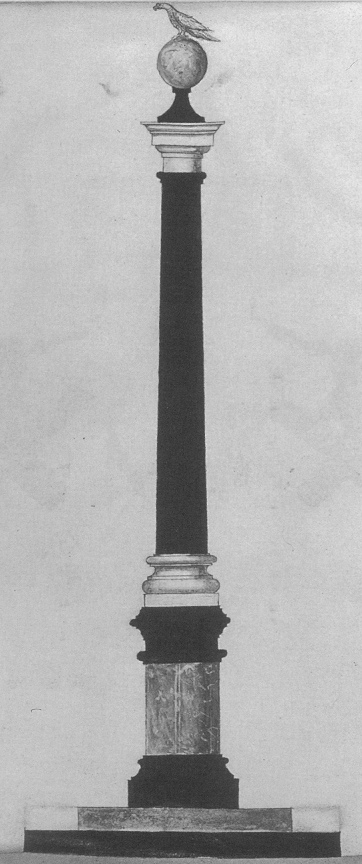
Falcon Perch

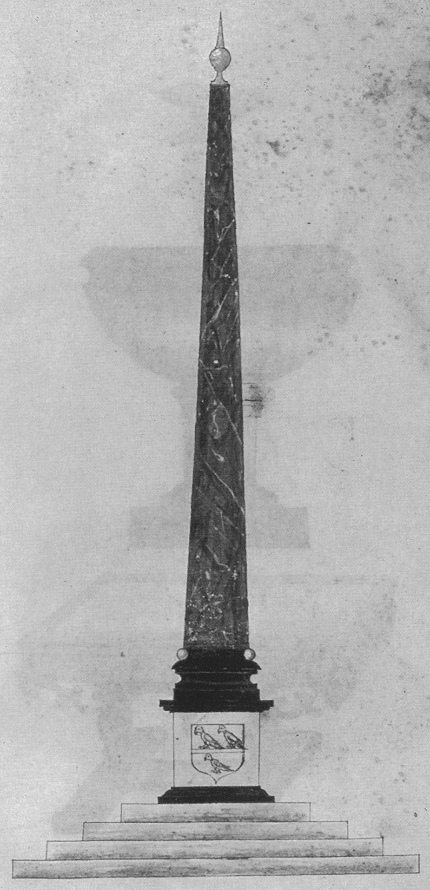
Pyramid

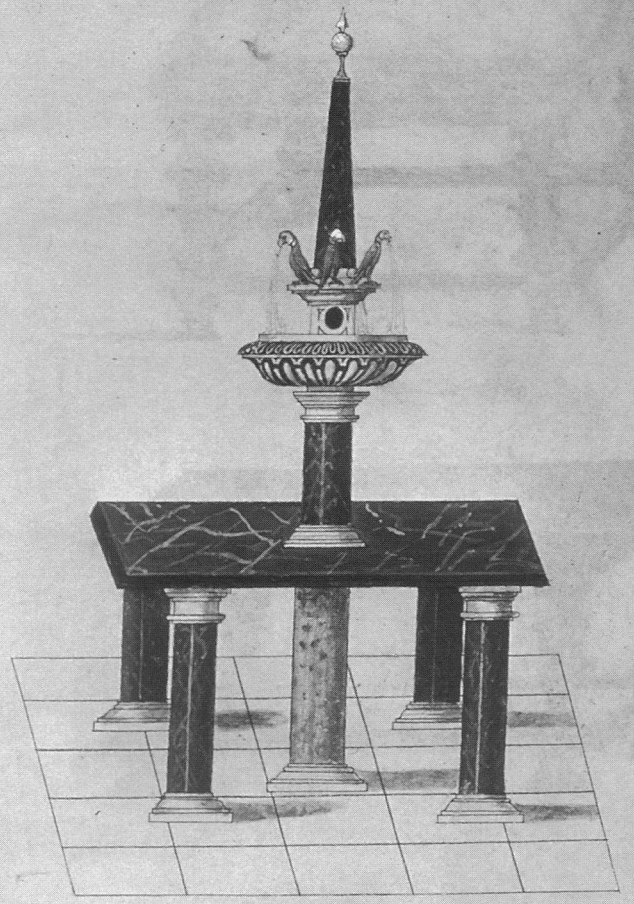
Table Fountain

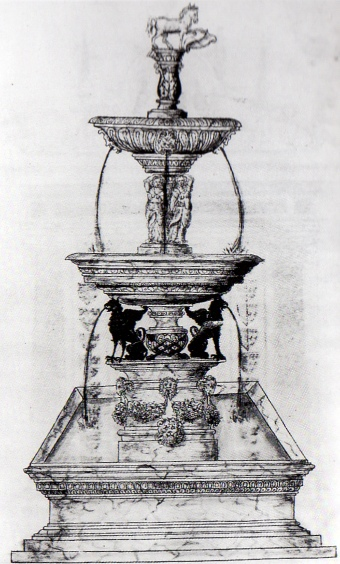
Inner Court Fountain

== See also ==
- Artists of the Tudor court
- Nonsuch (disambiguation)
- Nonsuch House on Old London Bridge
- Loseley Park
