= Epsom Rural District =

Former local government area in the UK

Coordinates: 51.31°N 0.30°W

Epsom was a rural district of Surrey from 1894 to 1933.

It was created in 1894 and covered the area of the formed Epsom Rural Sanitary District – i.e. the parishes of Ashtead, Banstead, Cheam, Chessington, Cobham, Cuddington, Ewell, Fetcham, Great Bookham, Headley, Little Bookham and Stoke d'Abernon. The parish of Woodmansterne was added from the disbanded Croydon Rural District in 1915, whilst Cheam became part of the Sutton and Cheam urban district in 1918.

The rural district was abolished in 1933, under the Local Government Act 1929. It was split between the urban districts of Banstead, Carshalton, Dorking, Epsom and Ewell, Esher, Leatherhead, Surbiton and Sutton and Cheam, and Dorking and Horley Rural District.

Parish	History
Ashtead	became part of Leatherhead Urban District in 1933
Banstead	became part of Banstead Urban District in 1933
Cheam	became part of Sutton and Cheam Urban District in 1918
Chessington	became part of Surbiton Urban District in 1933
Cobham	became part of Esher Urban District in 1933
Cuddington	became part of Epsom and Ewell Urban District (with 559 acres (2.26 km^{2}) transferred to Cheam in Sutton and Cheam Urban District) in 1933
Ewell	became part of Epsom and Ewell Urban District (with 118 acres (0.48 km^{2}) transferred to Banstead in Banstead Urban District) in 1933
Fetcham	became part of Leatherhead Urban District in 1933
Great Bookham	became part of Leatherhead Urban District (with 888 acres (3.59 km^{2}) transferred to Wooton in Dorking and Horley Rural District) in 1933
Headley	became part of Dorking and Horley Rural District in 1933
Little Bookham	became part of Leatherhead Urban District (with 183 acres (0.74 km^{2}) transferred to Wooton in Dorking and Horley Rural District) in 1933
Stoke d'Abernon	became part of Esher Urban District in 1933
Woodmansterne	added from Croydon Rural District in 1915; became part of Banstead Urban District in 1933
