= Municipal Borough of Sutton and Cheam =

Former local government district in the United Kingdom

Coordinates: 51.36°N 0.20°W

Sutton and Cheam (Sutton from 1882 to 1928)
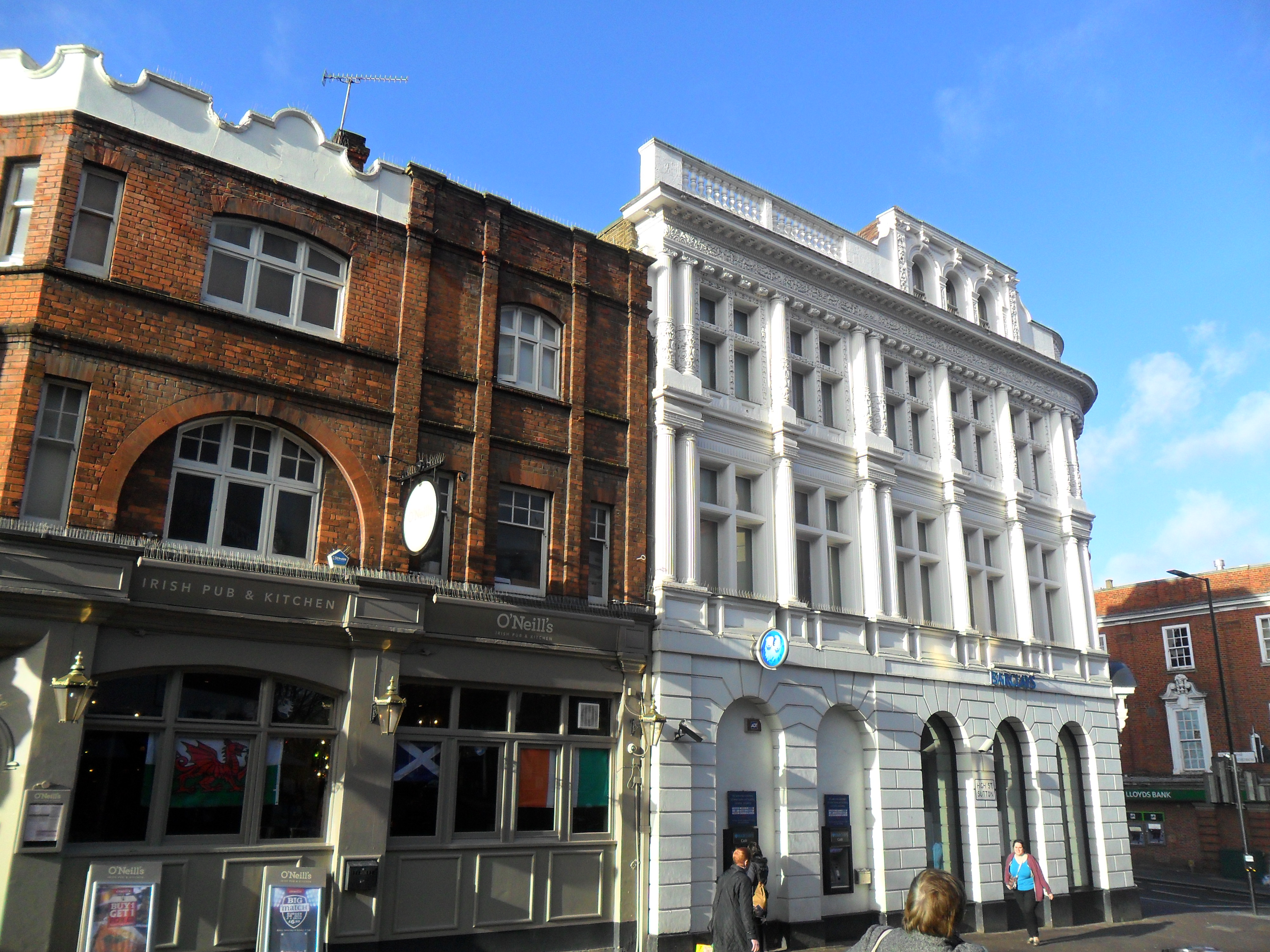
- Area
  - 1891: 1,836 acres (7.43 km^{2})
  - 1931: 3,744 acres (15.15 km^{2})
  - 1961: 4,338 acres (17.56 km^{2})
- Population
  - 1891: 10,334
  - 1931: 46,500
  - 1961: 79,008
- Density
  - 1891: 5.6/acre
  - 1931: 12.4/acre
  - 1961: 18.2/acre
- History
  - Origin: Sutton parish
  - Created: 1882
  - Abolished: 1965
  - Succeeded by: London Borough of Sutton
- Status: local government district (1882—1894) urban district (1894—1934) municipal borough (1934—1965) civil parish (1949—1965)
- Government
  - HQ: Civic Offices, Throwley Road
  - Motto: Serve God and Be Cheerful
- Coat of arms
- Subdivisions
  - Type: Civil parish
  - Units: Sutton (1882—1949); Cheam (1928—1949)

Sutton and Cheam was a local government district in northeast Surrey, England from 1882 to 1965.

== History ==
Sutton Local Government District was formed on 20 December 1882, when the (civil) parish of Sutton adopted the Local Government Act 1858. Sutton Local Board was formed to govern the area.

The Local Government Act 1894 reconstituted the district as Sutton Urban District and an urban district council replaced the local board.

In 1928 the Urban District grew to take in the westerly strip parish of Cheam (which was 4% larger) from Epsom Rural District and was thus renamed Sutton and Cheam Urban District. Both occupy and are centred on spring line settlements next to the North Downs. The new body took in an extra 569 acres (2.3 km^{2}) and 1840 people from 1933 when a county review order abolished Epsom Rural District, specifically drawing on parts of Banstead and Cuddington civil parishes. At the same time about 212 versus 235 people's homes moved council by an imposed land exchange with Carshalton Urban District, seeing a net gain of 8 acres; three simultaneous changes moved no homes but saw a net gain of 16 acres. The council successfully petitioned for a charter of incorporation so it became a municipal borough in 1934. Charter Day was celebrated on 12 September 1934 with local festivities, including a quarter peal on the bells of All Saints, Benhilton.

The borough was granted a coat of arms on incorporation. The shield had six emblems suggestive of the pan-medieval ecclesiastical landowners. The crosses came from the arms of the Archdiocese of Canterbury, the manor of Cheam having been granted to Christchurch, Canterbury in 1018. The keys of St Peter came from the arms of Chertsey Abbey who held Sutton at the time of the Domesday Book. The crest above the shield was a popinjay (parrot) from the arms of the Lumley family. The motto was that of John Hacket, rector of Cheam from 1624 - 1662 and was Bishop of Lichfield and Coventry in the last 10 years of his life.

In 1965, under the London Government Act 1963, the borough was abolished and its land transferred to Greater London merging with Carshalton Urban District and the Municipal Borough of Beddington and Wallington to form the London Borough of Sutton.

Year	1881	1891	1901	1911	1921	1931	1939	1951	1961
Population	10,334	13,977	17,223	21,270	21,063	46,500	73,593	80,673	79,008
