= Nonsuch Park =

Public park in Stoneleigh, Surrey, England

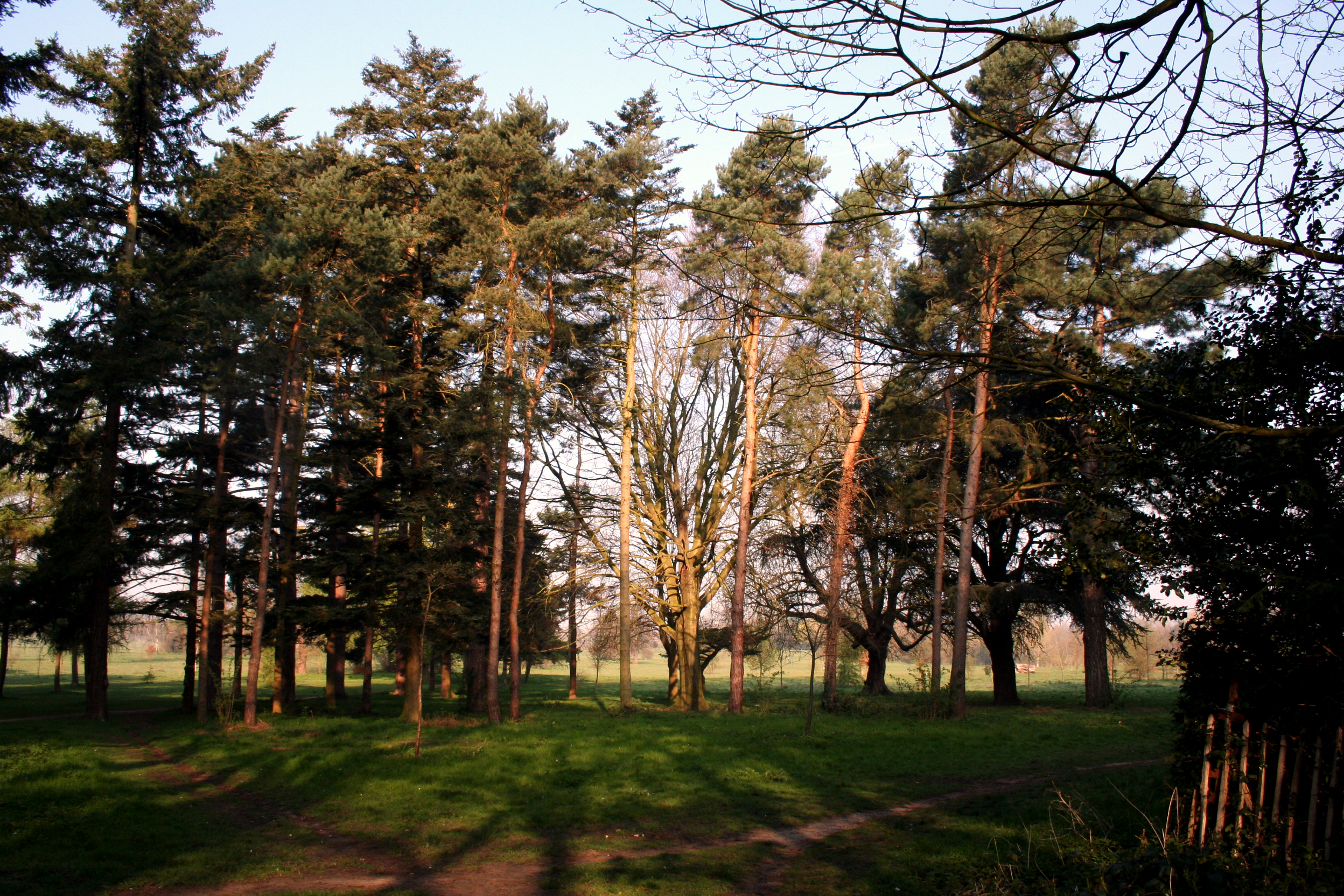
- Trees in Nonsuch Park

- Location within Surrey
- Type: Public park
- Location: Stoneleigh, Surrey, England
- Coordinates: 51°21′29″N 0°13′43″W
- Operator: Epsom and Ewell and London Borough of Sutton
- Status: Open year round

Nonsuch Park /ˈnʌnˌsʌtʃ/ is a public park between Stoneleigh, Cheam, and Ewell in the borough of Epsom and Ewell in Surrey, England. It borders the London Borough of Sutton. It is the last surviving part of the Little Park of Nonsuch, a deer hunting park established by Henry VIII surrounding the former Nonsuch Palace.

The western regions of the larger adjacent Great Park of Nonsuch became known as Worcester Park after the 4th Earl of Worcester was appointed Keeper of the Great Park in 1606.

The park contains Nonsuch Mansion, also known as Nonsuch Park House.

== History ==
=== Early history ===
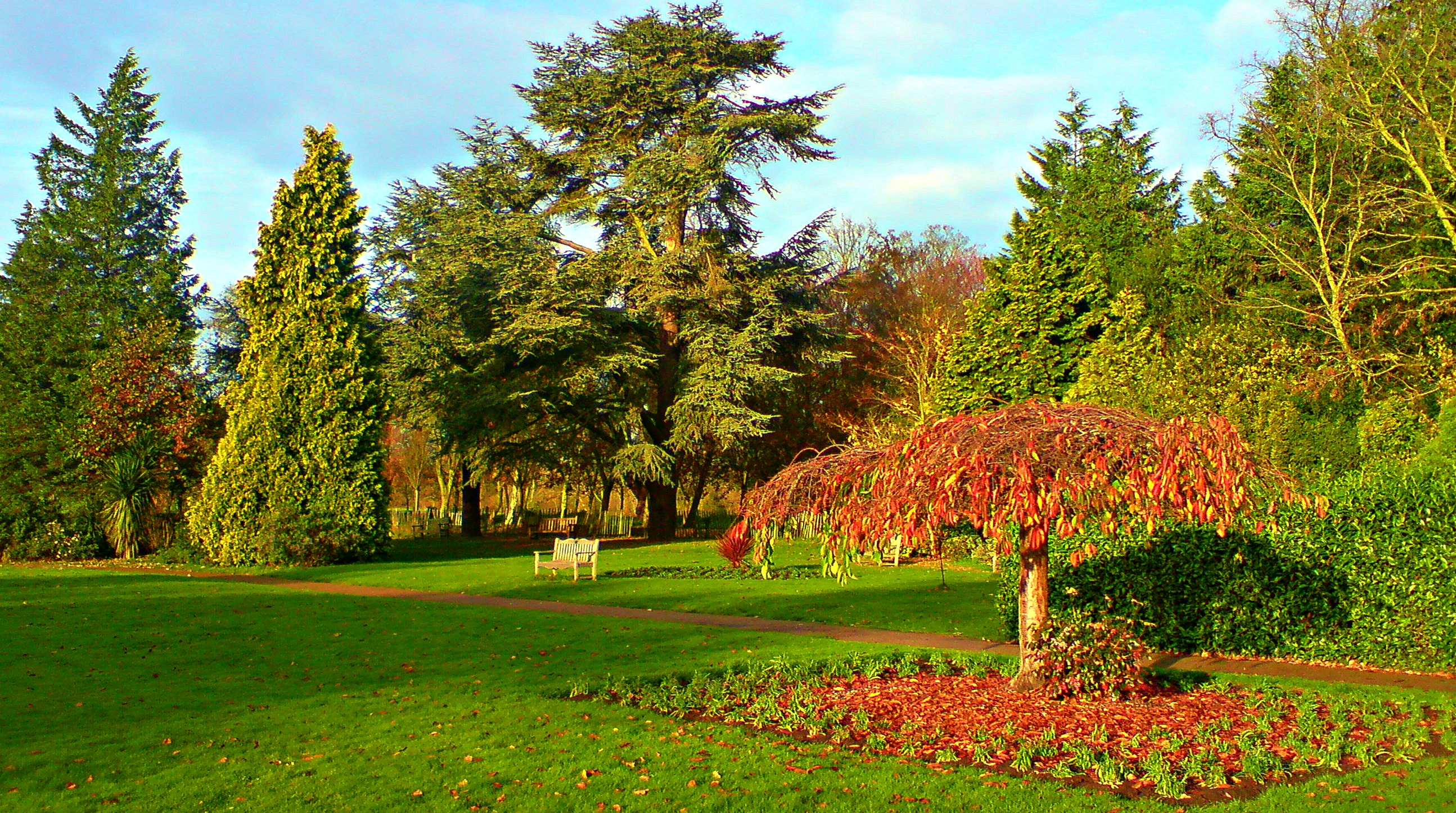
The gardens of Nonsuch Mansion

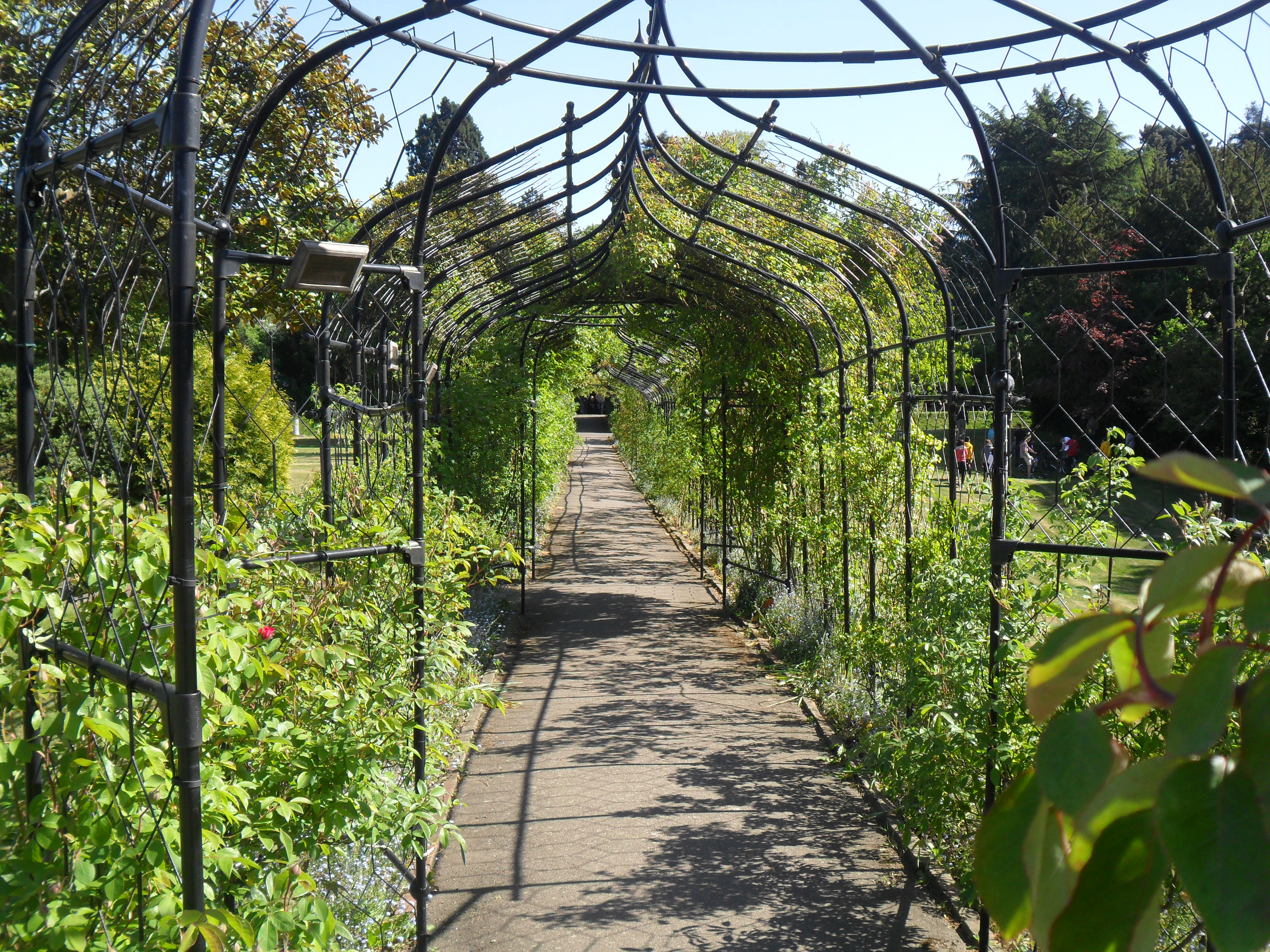
Flower Garden

There is evidence of a possible Iron Age settlement towards the southern side of the park which was identified during road construction in 1939. Pits and hearths containing Iron Age pottery, burnt flints and a spindlewhorl were found, though subsequent archaeological surveys in 1993–1995 revealed no traces of earthworks or surface finds.

The Roman road Stane Street passed along the northwestern boundary of what is now Nonsuch Park (the modern day London Road/A24) on its way from London to Chichester via the nearby spring at Ewell.

The village of Cuddington was located within the current Nonsuch Park. It appears in Domesday Book of 1086 as Codintone. Its domesday assets were: 5 hides; 1 mill worth 3 shillings; and 9 ploughs. It rendered £9 12s. Its total population was recorded as 28 households.

Part of the Medieval (possibly Early Medieval or even Roman) trackway Vicarage Lane passes through the southwest of the park from Ewell Castle School towards the site of Nonsuch Palace and would have originally passed through the village of Cuddington. The track is now considerably sunken but is still a public right of way.

=== Early modern period ===
In 1538 Henry VIII had Nonsuch Palace built on the site of the village of Cuddington, which was completely demolished including the manor house, great barn, 12th-century church and churchyard. The landowner, Richard Codington, received the dissolved Priory, manor, rectory and lands of Ixworth, Suffolk. This transaction took place in November 1538. The name "Nonesuch" was given as, it was claimed, there was "none such place like it" in Europe. The palace was incomplete when Henry VIII died in 1547 and it was later pulled down around 1682–1683 and the building materials sold off to pay gambling debts of the then owner Barbara, Countess of Castlemaine.

In his 1598 account of his travels around England ("Travels in England during the reign of Queen Elizabeth"), Paul Hentzner describes favourably the palace and the surrounding parks:

The palace itself is so encompassed with parks full of deer, delicious gardens, groves ornamented with trellis-work, cabinets of verdure, and walks so embrowned by trees, that it seems to be a place pitched upon by Pleasure herself, to dwell in along with Health.

Hentzner also describes the surrounding gardens, now disappeared and part of the park, as having:

many columns and pyramids of marble, two fountains that spout water one round the other like a pyramid, upon which are perched small birds that stream water out of their bills... a very agreeable fountain, with Actaeon turned into a stag, as he was sprinkled by the goddess and her nymphs, with inscriptions... [and] another pyramid of marble full of concealed pipes, which spurt upon all who come within their reach.

Regarding the name "Nonesuch", Hentzner comments that it was justified as it was "without an equal" and says that a post read: "This, which no equal has in art or fame, Britons deservedly do NONESUCH name."

Samuel Pepys visited the area on numerous occasions, often staying in nearby "Yowell" (Ewell), and described the park as having "A great walk of an elme and a walnutt set one after another in order." On 26 July 1663, Pepys wrote that whilst riding in the area of the park and palace, his "...little dogg, as he used to do, fell a-running after a flock of sheep feeding on the common, till he was out of sight...".

In 1959 a major archaeological exploration of the anticipated site of the palace itself was started. This excavation led to a major set of developments in post-medieval archaeology. The site of the palace is marked by three small stone columns which have plaques with the groundplan mounted on them, whilst the layout of the various palace gardens is somewhat coterminous with the current layout of different fields and areas.

The site of the banqueting house is clearly visible in the far west of the park near the A240 road; the Tudor structure was demolished in 1667 but a retaining wall, approximately 1m high, was rebuilt in the nineteenth century incorporating some original Tudor bricks as part of a conversion to an arboretum.

=== Later history ===
The park contains Nonsuch Mansion, also called Nonsuch Park House, which was built in the mid-eighteenth century and extended by Jeffry Wyattville at the beginning of the nineteenth in Tudor Gothic style. It is Grade II* listed by English Heritage.

There was a chalk quarry located in what is now the gardens of Nonsuch Mansion. It dates back to at least 1731 as it was marked "Chalk Pitt" on an estate map, but it is probable that it dates back further and is "thought to have been a source for chalk for the production of lime required for the construction of Nonsuch Palace". Parts of the quarry and some minor earthworks have been incorporated into the gardens.

The local soil includes deposits of clay, suitable for pottery. There is evidence of clay-digging and a pottery in the west of the park from at least 1708 until being discontinued around 1790. The more substantial Nonsuch Pottery was established in about 1800 in a similar area between London Road and Vicarage Lane and produced deep black abrasive rubbing bricks. The pottery no longer exists, but it was still shown on Ordnance Survey maps from at least 1913. The site is now partially occupied by BMX ramps and trails.

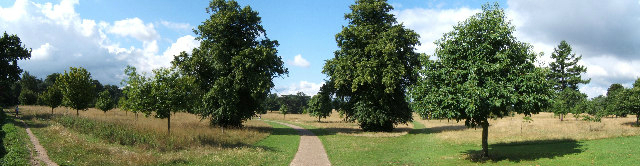
Panorama of Nonsuch Park

== Modern day ==
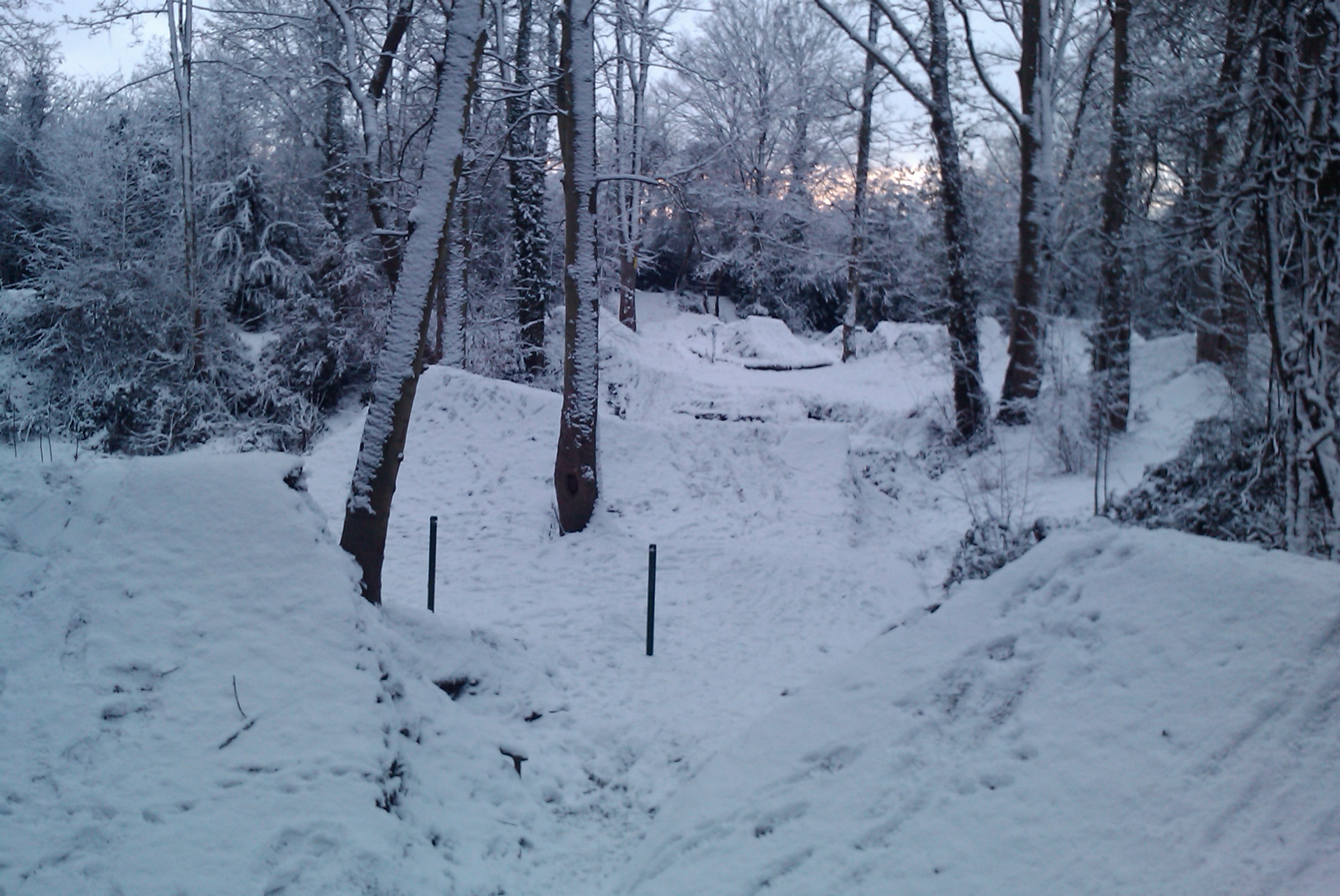
"Devil's Dyke" under snow, January 2010

Nonsuch Park and the Mansion have been managed by Epsom and Sutton Councils through a joint management committee (JMC) since the land was purchased by four councils in 1937 to save it from development as part of the establishment of the Metropolitan Green Belt. The title deeds to the land are held in trust by Surrey County Council. The JMC has run the park and Epsom and Sutton Councils have paid for the upkeep of the park with no financial support from Surrey County Council. In 2007 Surrey County Council rejected a proposal by the JMC to lease out the Mansion House.

At the southern end of the Park there are the concrete foundations of a road abandoned when the Park became Green Belt. Beyond this is Warren Farm, an open space belonging to the Woodland Trust. The London Loop goes through Warren Farm and Nonsuch Park.

In the west of the park there is an area, formerly a clay pit as mentioned above, used by the local BMX community containing jumps and trails. Locally known as "Devil's Dyke", the area has been used for this purpose for at least 30 years and has, since 2009, had backing from the Nonsuch Park Joint Management Committee. The area is now fenced off but is clearly visible from nearby footpaths.

A 5 km (3.1 mi) parkrun takes place every Saturday morning.
