= Glaisdale School =

Coordinates: 51.3533°N 0.2109°W

Location
- Arundel Road; Cheam, Sutton, Greater London; England

Information
- Type: Independent Preparatory
- Religious affiliation: Christian
- Established: 1925
- Closed: 2005
- Local authority: Sutton
- Gender: Mixed
- Age: 2 to 11
- Enrolment: c.150

Glaisdale School was an independent preparatory school on Arundel Road in Cheam situated in the London Borough of Sutton.

== History ==
Glaisdale School was opened by Agnes White, assisted by her daughter Berthain, in 1925 in a private detached house in Brighton Road Sutton. To accommodate growing numbers after the Second World War it enlarged by acquiring the detached house next door and filling the space in between. In the 1990s a hall was added. Despite consistently good inspection findings from the Office for Standards in Education (OFSTED), the school closed on 14 July 2005. The last head girl was Katie Walden-Hall.

== Education ==
Glaisdale Hat Ribbon from 1970s, showing colours of the school

The school was attended by children from the surrounding residential area who could enter via the nursery or older. The provision of education was deemed by independent inspection as very good or excellent in all areas including mathematics, language, literacy, physical and creative development and the quality of teaching and assessment was deemed excellent in the last inspection by OFSTED. The addition of the hall provided an area for gymnastics, music and movement, football, dance and drama as well as morning assembly.

== Alumni ==
- Sarah Fisher – Animal Practitioner of Talking to Animals fame. Married to Anthony Head.
- Ian Stewart – Early member of The Rolling Stones.

== Former Head teachers ==
- Mrs White (from 1925 to 1938 (deceased))
- Mrs E R A Hayter (from 1938 to 1965 (retired))
- Mrs Vera Froy and Mrs Lini Hughes (1965–1979)
- Mrs Jean Collins (1979–1987)
- Mrs Judith Hurst (1987–1990)
- Mrs Helen Steel (1990–1999)
- Mrs Helen Potter (1999-2005 )
- Mrs L Rose (2005)
