= Wallington Hundred =

Historical division of Surrey, England

Coordinates: 51.4°N 0.1°W

Wallington
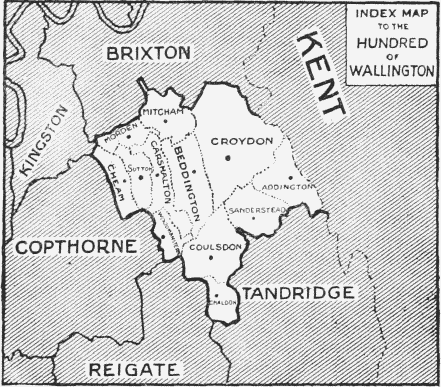
- Area
  - 1831: 36,470 acres (147.59 km^{2})
  - 1851: 38,406 acres (155.42 km^{2})
- Population
  - 1851: 33,950
  - 1861: 46,686
- History
  - Created: in antiquity
  - Abolished: 1883-1894
  - Succeeded by: various, see text
- Status: hundred
  - HQ: Wallington

Wallington was an ancient hundred in the northeast of the historic county of Surrey, England. The majority of its area has been absorbed by the growth of London; with its name currently referring to the district of Wallington. Its former area now corresponds to the London Borough of Sutton, the majority of the London Borough of Croydon and parts of the London Borough of Merton as well as parts of the Districts of Epsom and Ewell, Reigate and Banstead and Tandridge in Surrey.

== History ==
The hundred contained the parishes of Addington, Beddington, Carshalton, Chaldon, Cheam, Coulsdon, Croydon, Mitcham, Morden, Sanderstead, Sutton and Woodmansterne.

In Surrey it was bounded by Brixton hundred to the north, Kingston hundred and Copthorne hundred to the west, Reigate hundred and Tandridge hundred to the south. In the east its boundary was with the Bromley and Beckenham hundred of Kent.

In 1831, the hundred occupied 36,470 acres (147.59 km^{2}). In 1840, most of the hundred was included in the expanded Metropolitan Police District by the Metropolitan Police Act 1839.

In 1851 the hundred is recorded as comprising a First division of 23,581 acres (95.43 km^{2}) and a population of 22,343 and Second division of 14,825 acres (59.99 km^{2}) and a population of 11,607. The population in 1861 is recorded as 46,686.

== Replacement ==
The hundreds of England declined in administrative use because of the rise of various ad hoc boards. In 1883, Croydon, the most populous part of the hundred, became a Municipal borough and in 1889 it became the County Borough of Croydon autonomous from other local administration. Under the Local Government Act 1894, the remainder of the hundred came under the administration of the Croydon Rural District.

With the expansion of London at the beginning of the 20th century, parts of the rural district were separated off as Urban districts and the rural district was abolished in 1915 and its area divided into a number of new urban and rural districts. These districts or their successors were abolished or modified by the London Government Act 1963 to create the London boroughs which are still in place today.

== See also ==
- Medieval Surrey
- Surrey hundreds
