= Copthorne Hundred =

Historical division of Surrey, England

Coordinates: 51.30°N 0.25°W

Copthorne was a hundred of Surrey, England, an area above the level of the parishes and manors, where the local wise, wealthy and powerful met periodically in Anglo-Saxon England for strategic purposes. After the Norman Conquest the lords of the manor took to annual hundred meetings and their status became eroded by royal-approved transactions of land, as meanwhile the manorial courts and moreover royal courts seized jurisdiction over the Hundred Courts.

The name Copthorne may derive from a pollarded thorn tree at the place where the hundred met. The meeting point has been suggested to be marked by an earthwork and ancient hedge at the southern end of Woodcote Park, Epsom, close to Langley Vale. The earthwork is denoted as the Nutshambles on a map of Ashtead dating from 1638.

== Scope ==
Copthorne comprised the manors of Ashtead, Burgh, Cuddington, Epsom, Ewell, Fetcham, Headley, Leatherhead, Mickleham, Pachevesham (within Leatherhead parish), Tadworth, Thorncroft and Walton-on-the-Hill. It had two enclaves, areas of other parishes dominated by manors and sometimes churches within it: in Weybridge and Newdigate.

In the Domesday Book, the settlements of Ashtead, Fetcham and Mickleham were included in the Wallington (hundred); but the county historians cited by the Victoria County History of 1911 as having examined the Patent Rolls and similar state collections of deeds, royal letters and documents, such as Owen Manning and John Aubrey, agree that this was a mistake.

In present terms Epsom, Leatherhead and Ewell are almost uniformly called towns: for example at the county level of local government when it considers service provision and population analysis — the first two were granted market town status in the Middle Ages.

The Victoria County History, based on ecclesiastical records, states that these were its parishes:

- Ashtead
- Epsom
- Leatherhead
- Banstead
- Ewell
- Mickleham
- Chessington
- Fetcham
- Cuddington
- Headley
- Walton on the Hill
- Newdigate (part of)

== Ownership and late transactions ==

Copthorne was a royal hundred (to the extent its overarching overlordship affected the manors and common land), and remained in the hands of the Crown, though James I of England leased it for 21 years to Thomas Jenkins in 1617.

In a subsidy roll of the 14th century it was said to be worth £47 15s. 6¼d. and with Effingham Hundred the various land units within it were assessed in total for ship money at £136 16s. 4d. at the third such levy in 1636.

Magistrates / District Judge (Magistrates Court) geographical division

It was used as the Epsom Petty sessional division.

Contribution to constituencies

The area was an eastward projection of the West Surrey constituency an 1832-1885 dual-member (MP) area. With minor additions from Kingston, Effingham and Dorking Hundred it was then used for that of Epsom. Its northern bulk mirrors Epsom and Ewell the smaller modern successor.

== Domesday survey ==
Copthorne appears in the Book as Copededorne. Copthorne was a hundred (these are not in the Domesday Book's map of the county, which focuses on the main unit, manors).
