= Carshalton Council Offices =

Municipal building in London, England

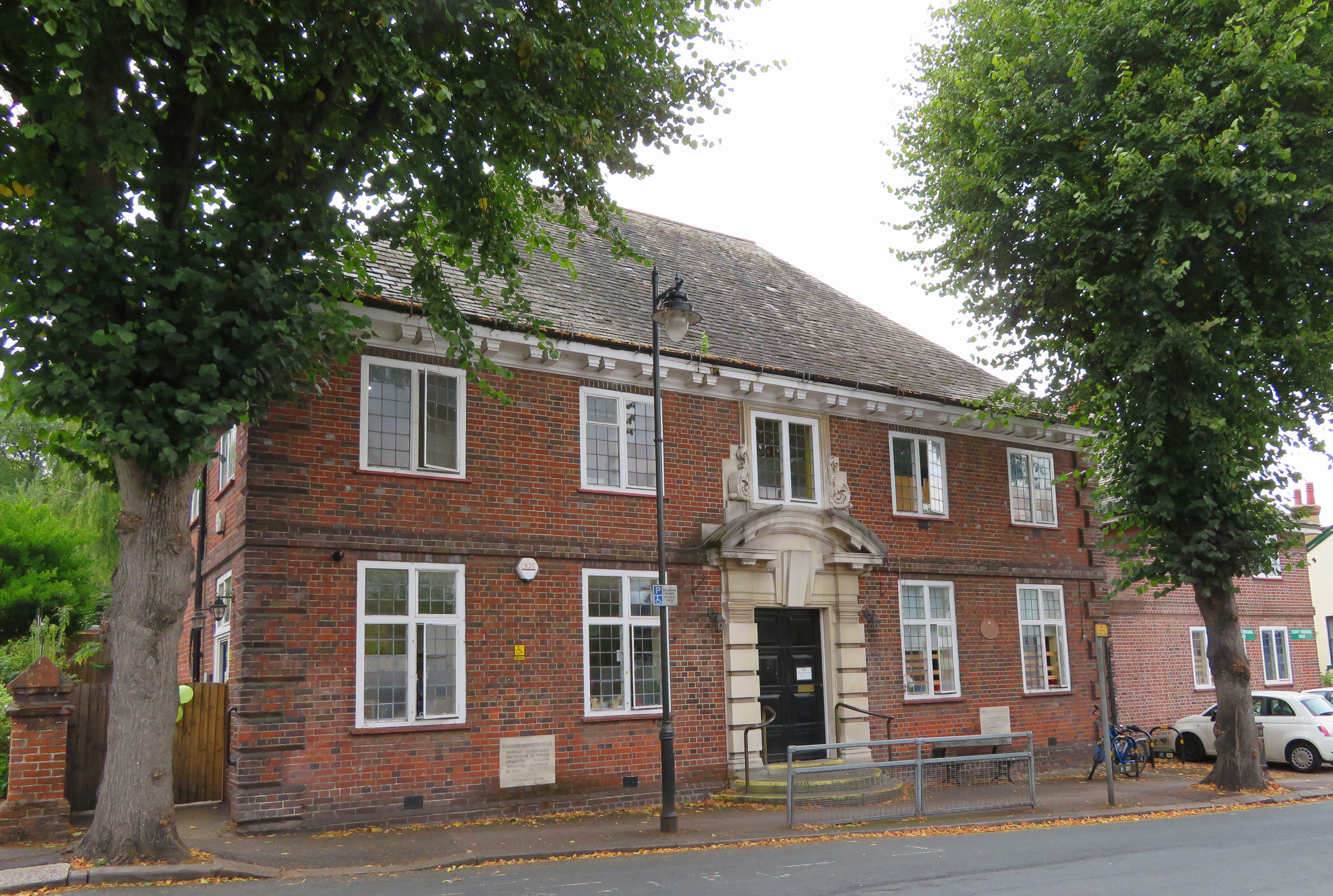
- Carshalton Council Offices

- Shown in Sutton
- 51.3647°N 0.1622°W
- Location: The Square, Carshalton

History
- Built: 1908

Site notes
- Architect(s): R. Frank Atkinson and W. Willis Gale
- Architectural style: Baroque Revival style

Listed Building – Grade II
- Official name: Carshalton Public Library
- Designated: 1 March 1974
- Reference no.: 1300429

The Carshalton Council Offices is a former municipal building on The Square, Carshalton, London. The structure, which was briefly the headquarters of Carshalton Urban District Council before becoming a public library, is a Grade II listed building.

== History ==
Following a significant increase in population, largely associated with the growing importance of the area as a residential suburb of London, the area became an urban district in 1894. The new urban district council initially rented premises in the High Street. In the early 20th century, civic officials, led by the clerk to the council, Charles Lovelock, launched an initiative to raise funds for purpose-built council offices. The site they selected, on the west side of The Square, had formed part of the grounds of All Saints Church.

It was designed by R. Frank Atkinson and W. Willis Gale in the Baroque Revival style, built in red and blue bricks with stone dressings at a cost of £2,500 and was officially opened by the chairman of the council, C W Edwards, on 21 December 1908. The design involved a symmetrical main frontage with five bays facing onto The Square; the central section bay featured a doorway flanked by banded pilasters supporting an entablature, which was broken by a large keystone, and an open segmental pediment. There was a casement window flanked by stone scrolls on the first floor. The other bays were fenestrated by cross-windows on the ground floor and by casement windows on the first floor. At roof level, there was a modillioned cornice.

Within a few years the civic leaders decided that the building was too small and Lovelock persuaded the lord of the manor, Blake Taylor, to sell land including The Grove and the rest of the area around the upper ponds to the council. By the mid-1920s, the council had relocated its offices to The Grove. The old council offices in The Square were converted for use as a library and a museum and were re-opened by the former member of parliament, Sir Thomas Worsfold, in January 1931. The museum failed to attract sufficient visitors and the collection was put into storage two years later. However, the building continued to serve the people of Carshalton as a public library until December 2012 when the library service relocated to the Westcroft Centre. The building then became a nursery but that also closed in 2020.
