= Nonsuch Mansion =

Country house in Surrey, England

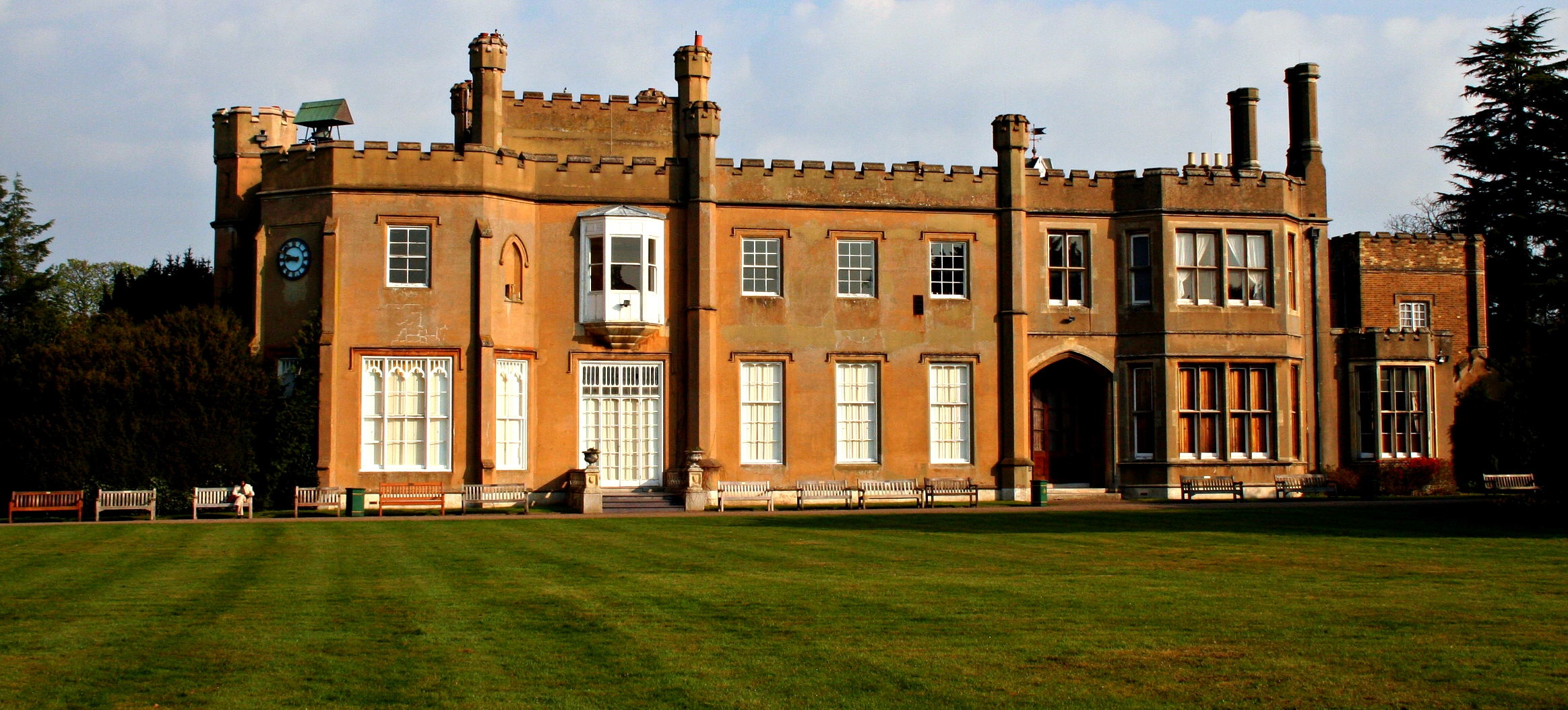
- The Mansion House, Nonsuch Park

- Location within Surrey

General information
- Location: Nonsuch Park, Surrey, England
- Coordinates: 51.358171°N 0.228714°W
- Construction started: 1731
- Completed: 1743
- Client: Joseph Thompson

Nonsuch Mansion is a historic house located within Nonsuch Park in north Surrey, England near the boundary with Greater London. It is in the borough of Epsom and Ewell, adjacent to the London Borough of Sutton. It has been listed Grade II* on the National Heritage List for England since April 1954.

== History ==
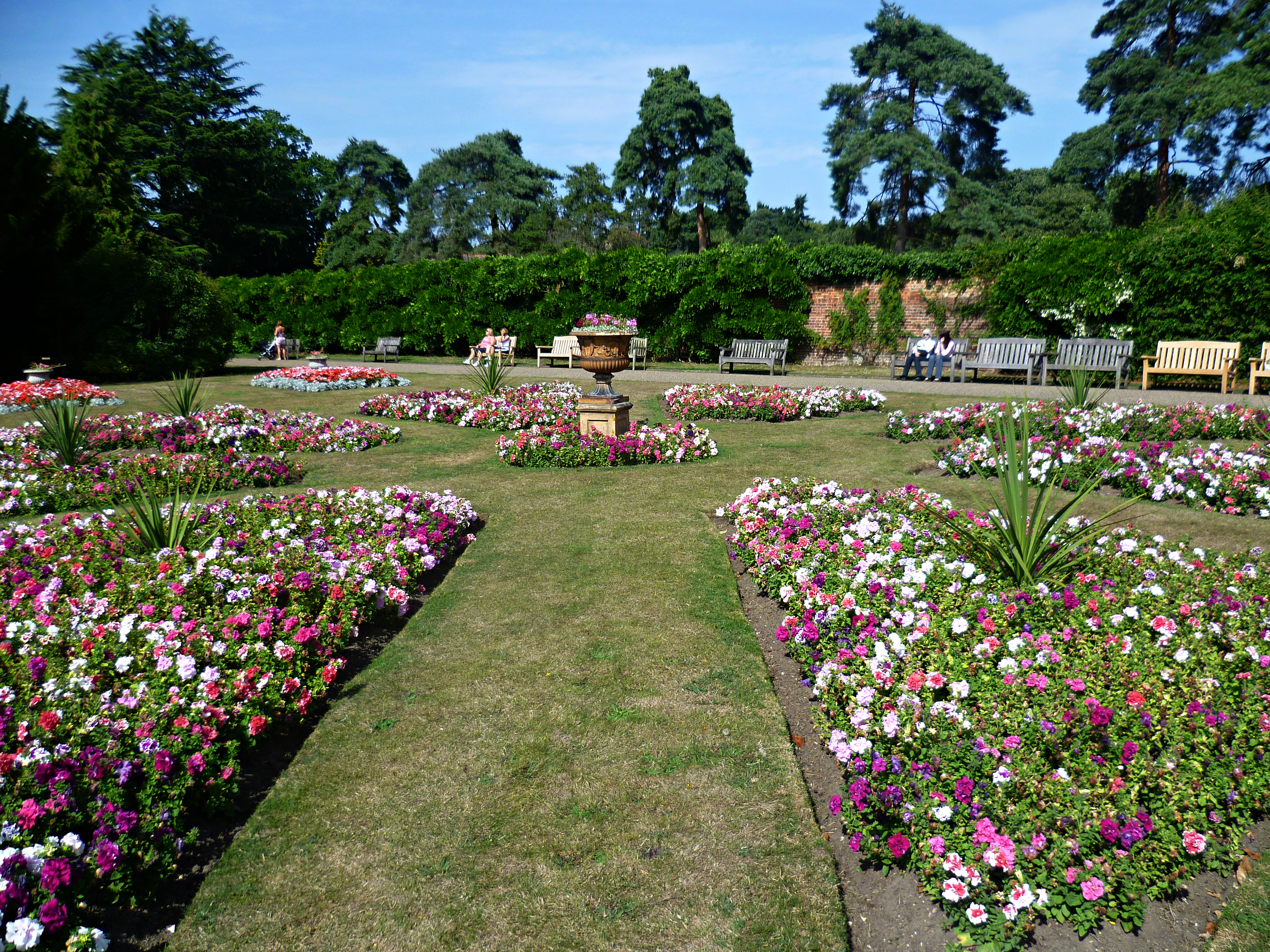
Mansion gardens

In medieval times it was part of the three thousand acre manor of Cuddington. The mansion was built in between 1731 and 1743 by Joseph Thompson and later bought by Samuel Farmer in 1799. He employed Jeffry Wyatville to rebuild it in a Tudor Gothic style in 1802 to 1806. Farmer was succeeded by his grandson in 1838 under whom the gardens became famous. Nonsuch Mansion bears a resemblance in its design to the original design of Nonsuch Palace, whose construction was begun by King Henry VIII in the 16th century.

In 1937 the Farmer family sold the mansion to a group of local authorities.

In 2020–2021 it served as a major hub for the COVID-19 vaccination for the London Borough of Sutton.

== Markings on the building ==
Built within the north porch of the mansion is a block from the original Nonsuch Palace that bears an inscription which means "1543 Henry VIII in the 35th year of His reign."

The Farmer family's crests are noticeable throughout the mansion, bearing a motto 'Hora e sempre' (now and forever).
