= Effingham Hundred =

Historical division of Surrey, England

Coordinates: 51.27°N 0.40°W

The Effingham Hundred in Surrey

Effingham Hundred or the Hundred of Effingham was a hundred but often treated as a half-hundred with that of Copthorne (to the east and north-east) and was the smallest in Surrey, England.

== Geography ==
It comprised the parishes of:

- Effingham.
- Great Bookham
- Little Bookham.

== History ==
From a date before the Tudor period until its end it was connected with Copthorne Hundred, and so was sometimes styled and treated as the Half-hundred of Effingham. It contained the smallest amount of land in Surrey, at 47 to 50 hides.

In the Domesday Book of 1086, Effingham Hundred included the above and two unknown settlements of Driteham and Pechingeorde.

It was a royal hundred, and in a document of the reign of Edward I is stated to have been farmed by all its various owners altogether formerly for half a mark per annum, but then for 1010s.

In minor civil dispute settlement, in 1628 the borough of Kingston received a grant of jurisdiction within the "hundred of Copthorne and Effingham" in compensation for their loss of the privilege of court leet in Richmond and Petersham and this grant was confirmed by Charles I to in 1638, and as the last vestige of the hundred's influence held good until late 19th century reforms.

== See also ==
- Medieval Surrey
- Surrey hundreds
