= Manor House School, Little Bookham =

Manor House School

Location
- Manor House Lane; Little Bookham, Surrey, KT23 4EN; England
- Coordinates: 51.2737°N 0.3914°W

Information
- Type: Independent school
- Motto: To love is to live
- Established: 1920
- Department for Education URN: 125352 Tables
- Head teacher: Tracey Fantham
- Age: 2 to 16
- Enrolment: 285
- Houses: discovery, victory, endeavour
- Colors: blue, green, yellow
- Website: www.manorhouseschool.org

Manor House School is a selective independent day school for girls located in Little Bookham, Surrey, England.

== History ==
Manor House School began as two small classes in Sidmouth, Devon in 1920. In 1929, the School decided to relocate to Surrey, in order to allow boarders, as Devon was too far from London to travel. For seven years the classes were based in Mickleham Hall, which was rented in Dorking. In 1937, the school moved to its current site, located in Little Bookham; the Queen Anne House was built in 1710 but had been empty for a long time. After moving in, the school has embarked on a major programme of expansion. New wings and blocks have been added: Arcot Hall, Mason block, the Nursery and Main Block. In 1961 Manor House became an educational trust.
