= Cheam =

London suburb

Coordinates: 51.36°N 0.21°W

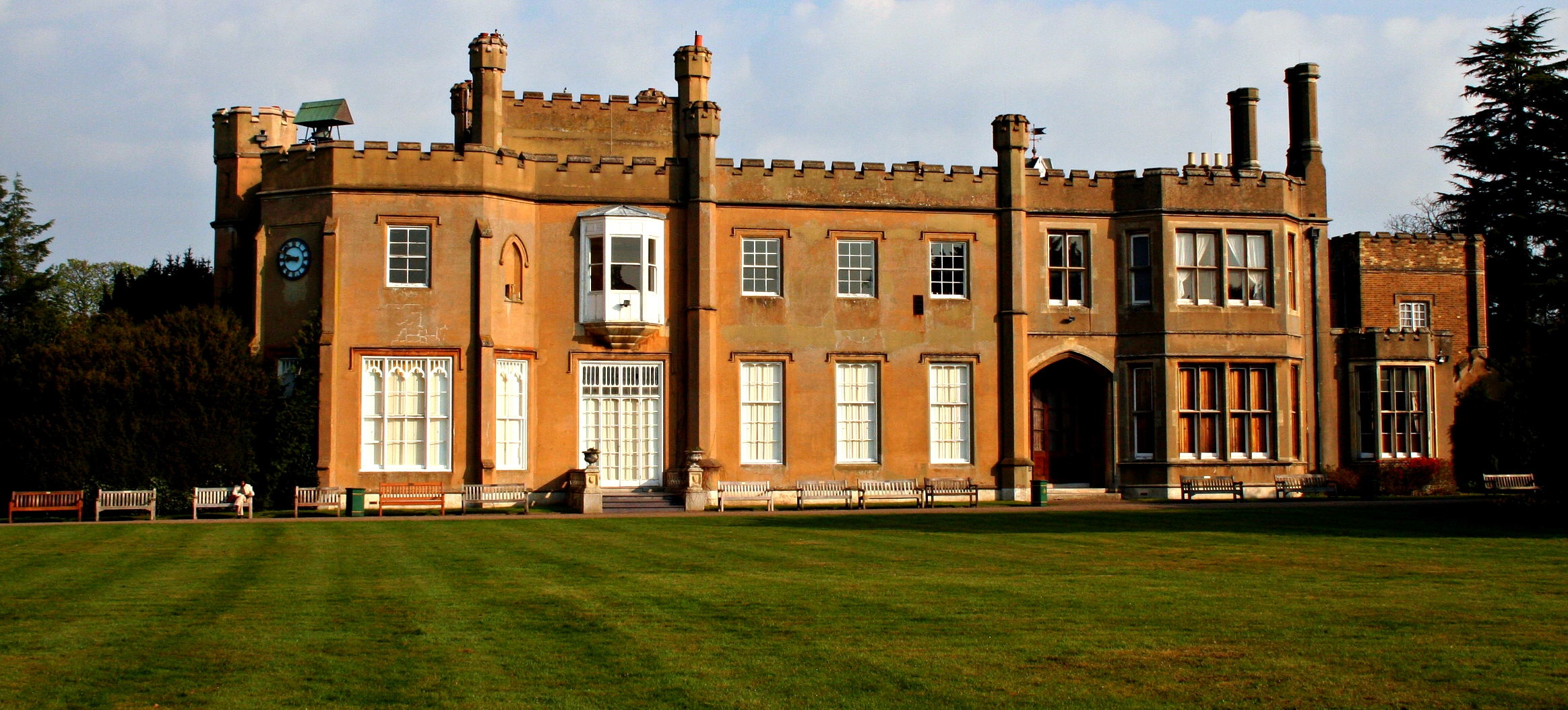
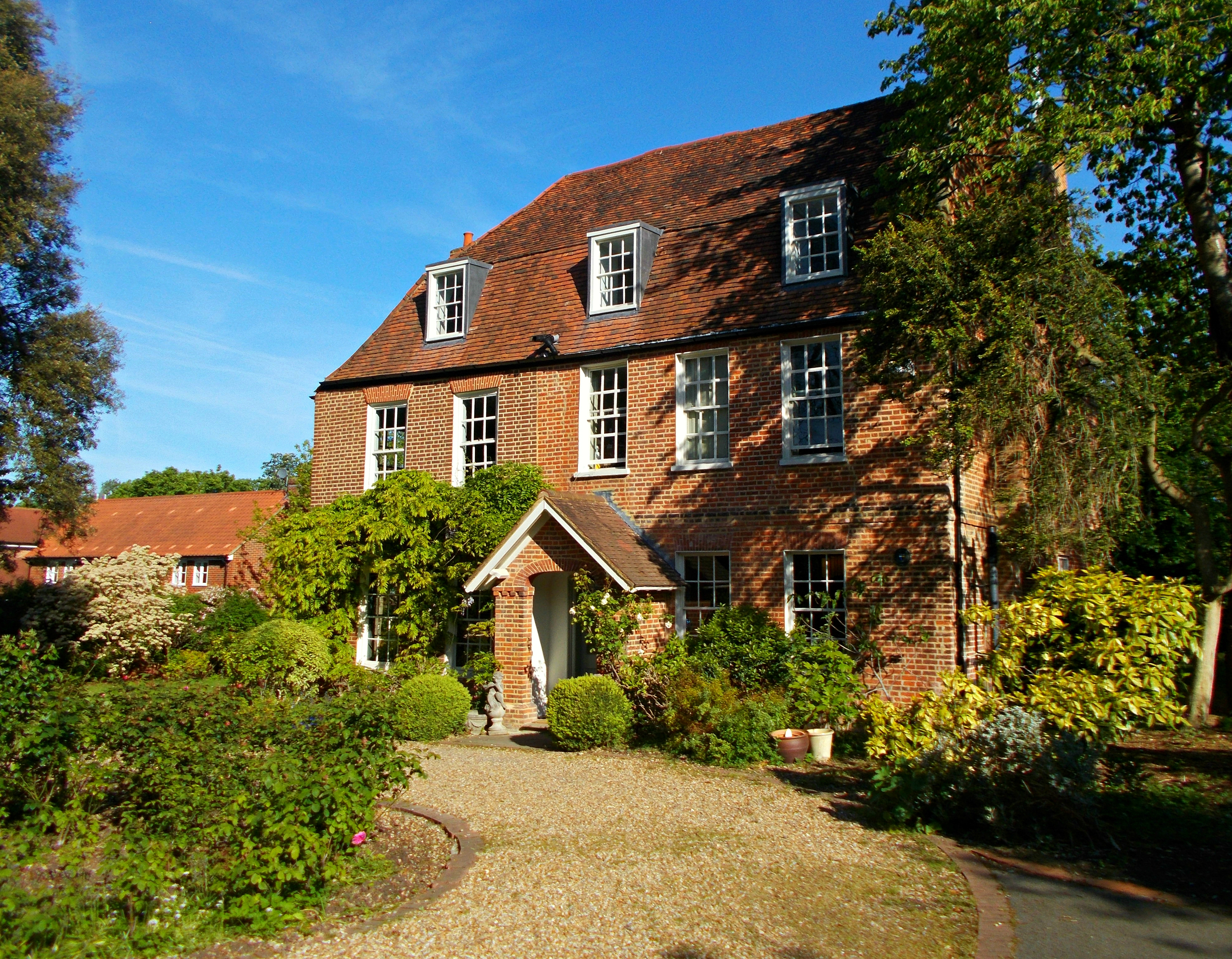
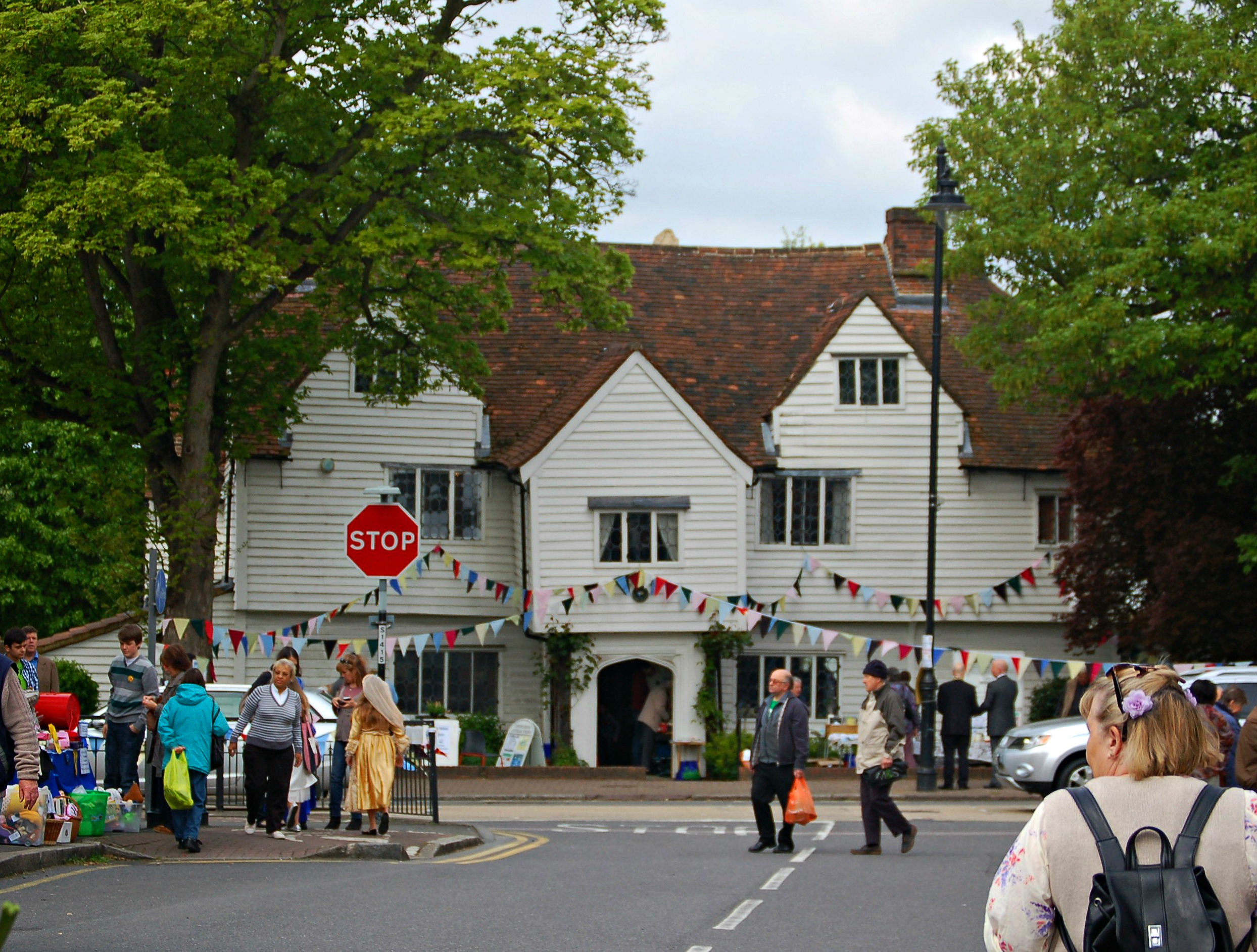
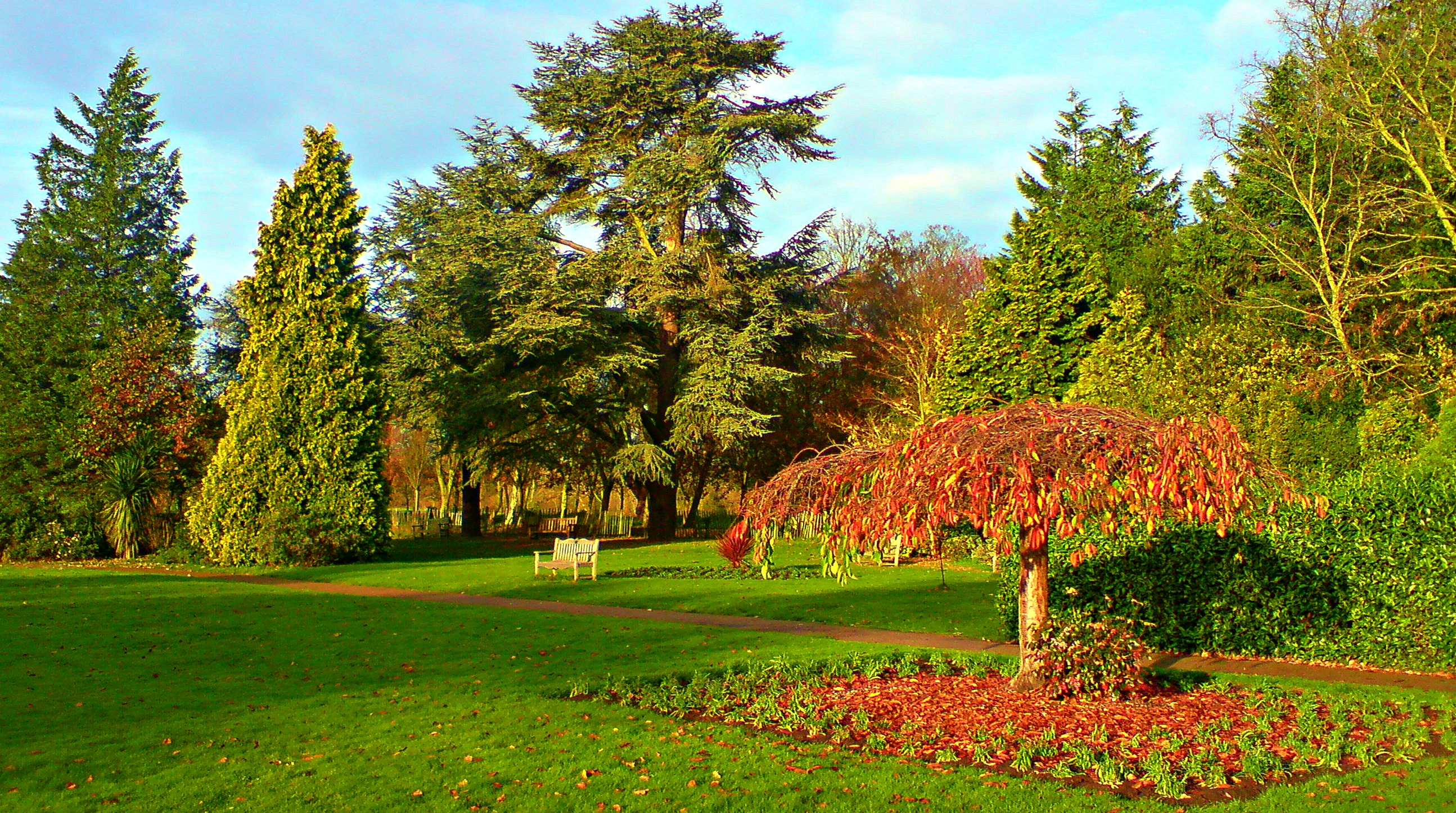
- Nonsuch Mansion in Nonsuch Park The Old Rectory Whitehall during Cheam Charter Fair Nonsuch Park

- Location within Greater London
- Population: 10,285 (2011 census, ward)
- OS grid reference: TQ245625
- London borough: Sutton
- Ceremonial county: Greater London
- Region: London
- Country: England
- Sovereign state: United Kingdom
- Post town: Sutton
- Postcode district: SM2, SM3
- Dialling code: 020
- Police: Metropolitan
- Fire: London
- Ambulance: London
- UK Parliament: Sutton and Cheam
- London Assembly: Croydon and Sutton

Cheam (/ˈtʃiːm/) is a suburb of London, England, 11 miles (18 km) southwest of Charing Cross. Cheam is in the London Borough of Sutton and is divided into North Cheam, Cheam Village and South Cheam. Cheam Village contains the listed buildings Lumley Chapel and the 16th-century Whitehall. It is adjacent to two large parks, Nonsuch Park and Cheam Park. Nonsuch Park contains the listed Nonsuch Mansion. Parts of Cheam Park and Cheam Village are in a conservation area. Cheam is bordered by Worcester Park to the northwest, Morden to the northeast, Sutton to the east, Epsom, Ewell and Stoneleigh to the west and Banstead and Belmont to the south.

== History ==
The Roman road of Stane Street forms part of the boundary of Cheam. The modern London Road at North Cheam follows the course of the Roman road through the area. It is designated A24.

The village lay within the Anglo-Saxon administrative division of Wallington hundred. Cheam is mentioned in the Charters of Chertsey Abbey in 727, which mentions Cheam being given to the monastery of Chertsey in 675; the name appears as Cegeham. However, the Charters are of dubious origin and are now regarded as obvious fabrications. The name 'Cheam', based on Cegeham, may mean 'village or homestead by the tree-stumps'.

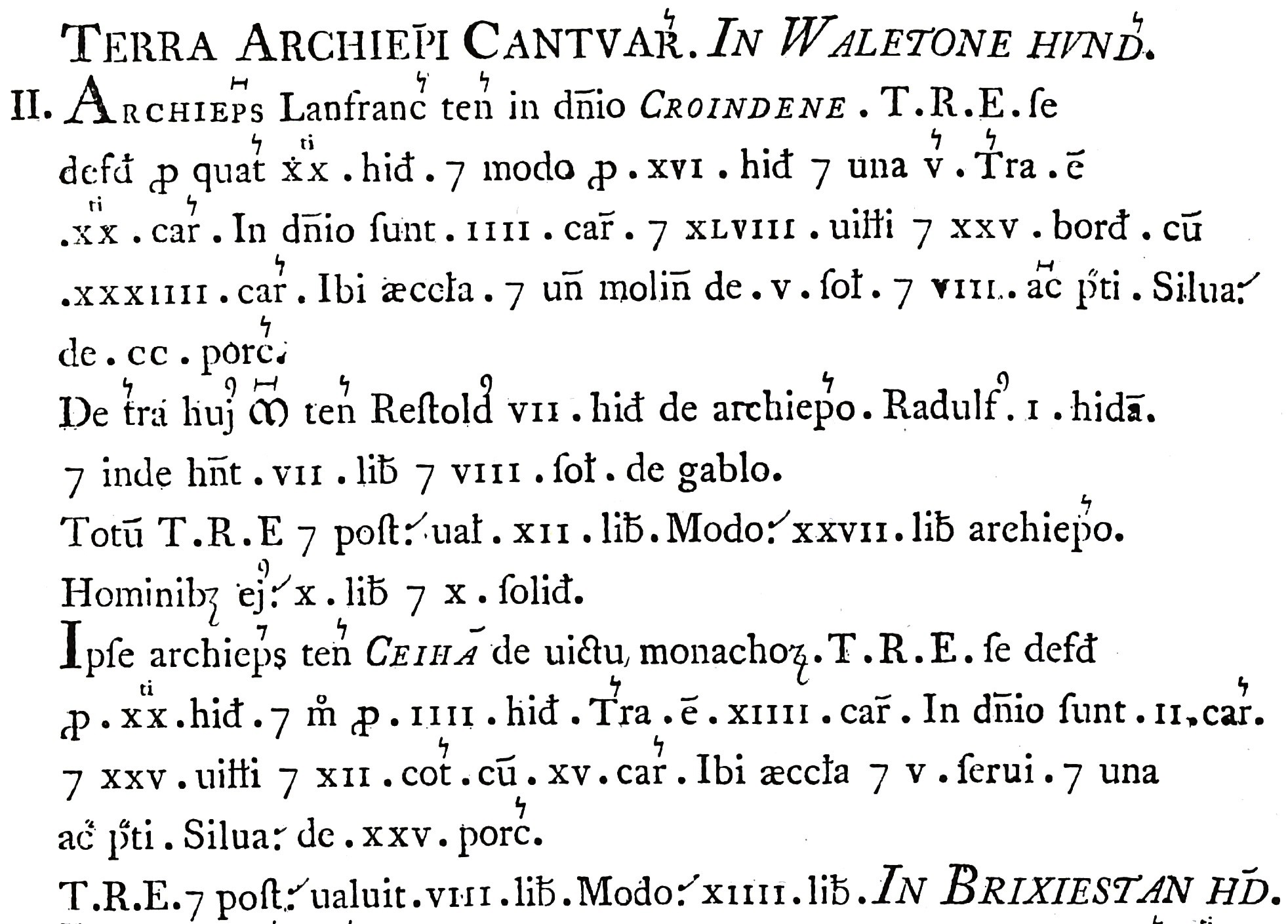
Entries for Croydon and Cheam in the 1783 published edition of Domesday Book

Cheam appears in Domesday Book as Ceiham. Held by Archbishop Lanfranc of Canterbury, its Domesday assets were four hides, one church, 17 ploughs, one mile (1.5 kilometres) of meadow, and woodland worth 25 hogs. It rendered £14.

In the Middle Ages, Cheam had potteries, and recent excavations have been carried out by archaeologists. In 1259, Henry III of England made Cheam a town by charter. In 1538, part of Cheam was handed over to Henry VIII. The same year, Henry began work on Nonsuch Palace, which he decorated elaborately. This was later sold and demolished.

In 1801, the time of the first census, Cheam had a population of 616.

Cheam was the original home of Cheam School which was formed in Whitehall in 1645 and later occupied Tabor Court from 1719 until 1934 when the school moved to Berkshire. Prince Philip attended the school in the years immediately preceding its move.

Lee Boxell, a 15-year-old schoolboy, disappeared near his home in Cheam on 10 September 1988. He was last seen outside of the then-Tesco supermarket (now an Asda) at 2:20 pm. The case remains unsolved. It was featured in the national press and on BBC TV's Crimewatch.

== Governance ==
Cheam is part of the Sutton and Cheam constituency for elections to the House of Commons of the United Kingdom.

Cheam is part of the Cheam, North Cheam, and Sutton West and East Cheam wards for elections to Sutton London Borough Council.

On 1 April 1949 the civil parish was abolished and merged with Sutton to form Sutton and Cheam. At the 1931 census (the last before the abolition of the parish), Cheam had a population of 18,511.

== Geography ==
=== Cheam Village ===
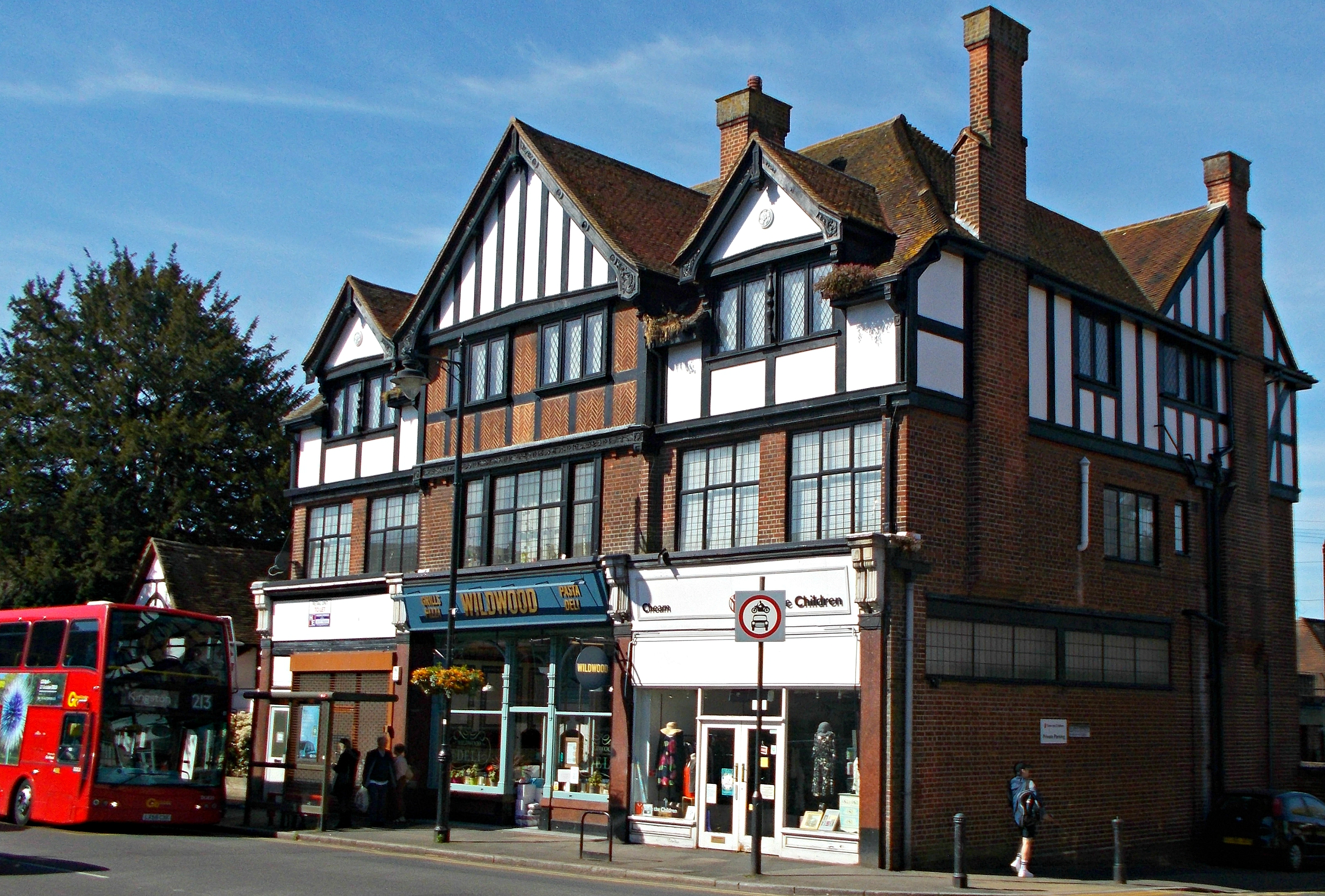
Broadway, Cheam

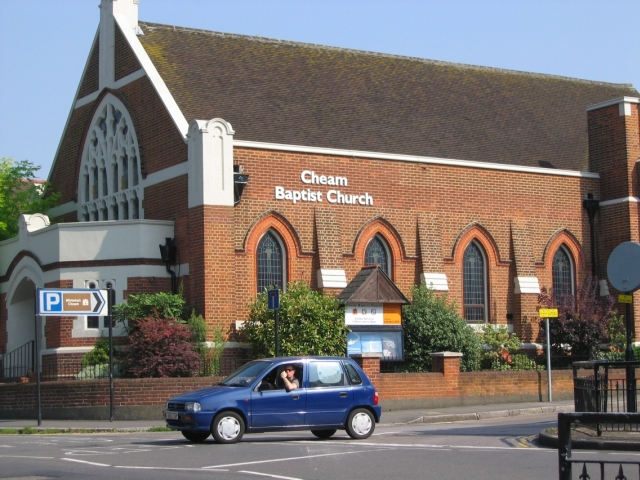
Cheam Baptist Church, Cheam Village

Cheam Village is centred on the crossroads between Sutton, North Cheam, South Cheam and Ewell.

It has a conservation area and a number of historic buildings dating back several centuries, including Nonsuch Mansion, the gabled Whitehall and Lumley Chapel, and a Georgian former rectory.

The Cheam Village Conservation Area was designated in 1970 – it covers historic parkland, housing of varying styles and age and a mock Tudor shopping area with timber detailing and leaded-lights. The entrances to Cheam Park and Nonsuch Park with its historic mansion are approximately 200 yards (180 m) from the village centre crossroads.

=== North Cheam ===
North Cheam is centred one mile (1.5 kilometres) north, at the crossroads between Cheam Village and Worcester Park, Epsom and Morden.

== Culture ==
Every year on 15 May the Cheam Charter Fair is held. It is thought to date back to 1259 when Henry III granted Cheam a charter, making it a town. Firm historical records of Cheam Charter Fair date back to the 1800s when a fairground accompanied the market.

== Landmarks ==
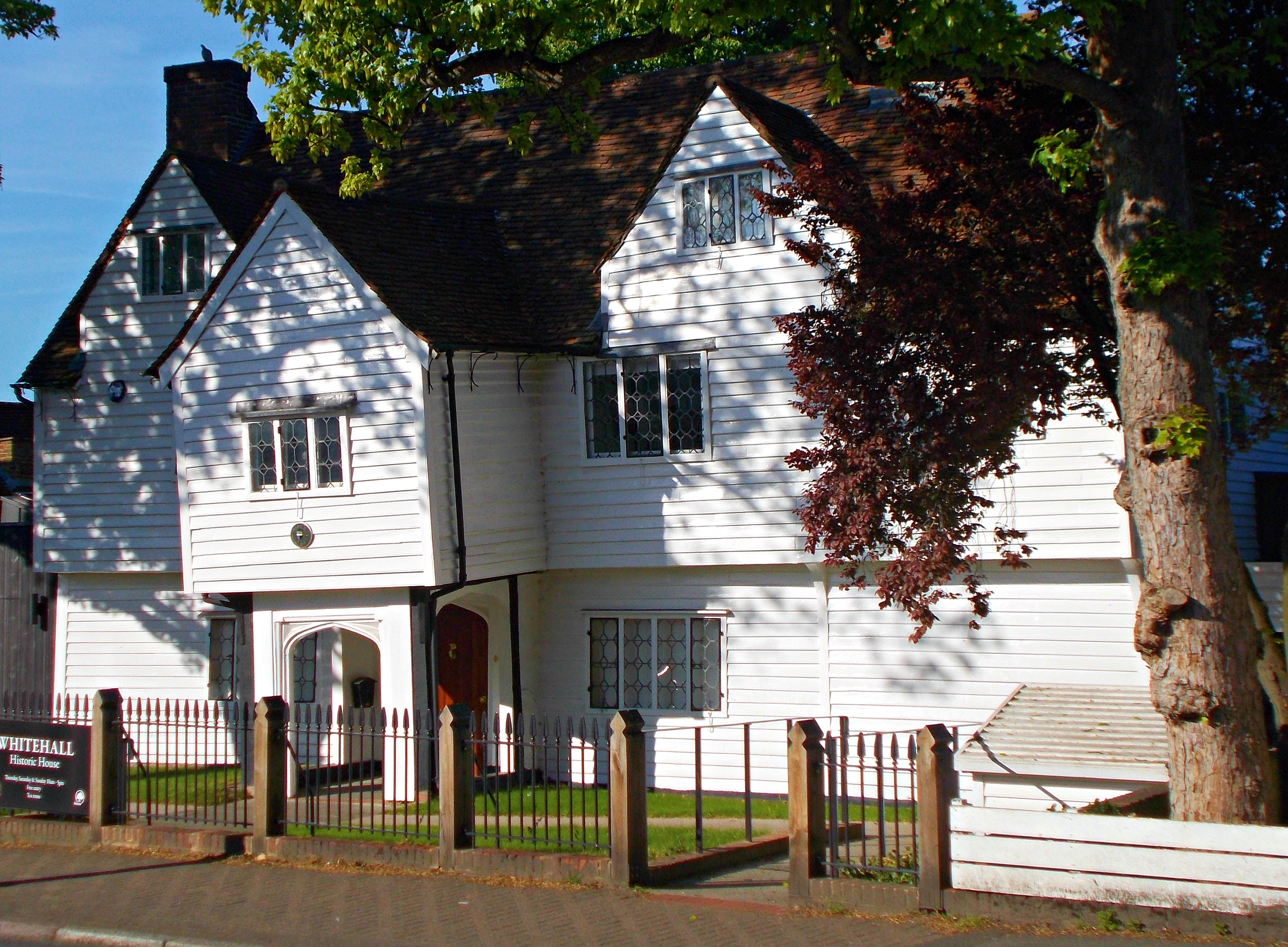
Whitehall, Cheam and its projecting upper storey

=== Whitehall ===
Whitehall is a timber framed and weatherboarded house in the centre of Cheam Village. It was originally built in about 1500 as a wattle and daub yeoman farmer's house but has been much extended. The external weatherboard dates from the 18th century. In the garden there is a medieval well which served an earlier building on the site.

Now an historic house museum, the building features a period kitchen, and house details from the Georgian, Victorian and Edwardian eras. The museum temporarily closed in 2016 to allow for a £1.6 million refurbishment of the building. It reopened in June 2018 with improved facilities.

=== Cheam War Memorial ===
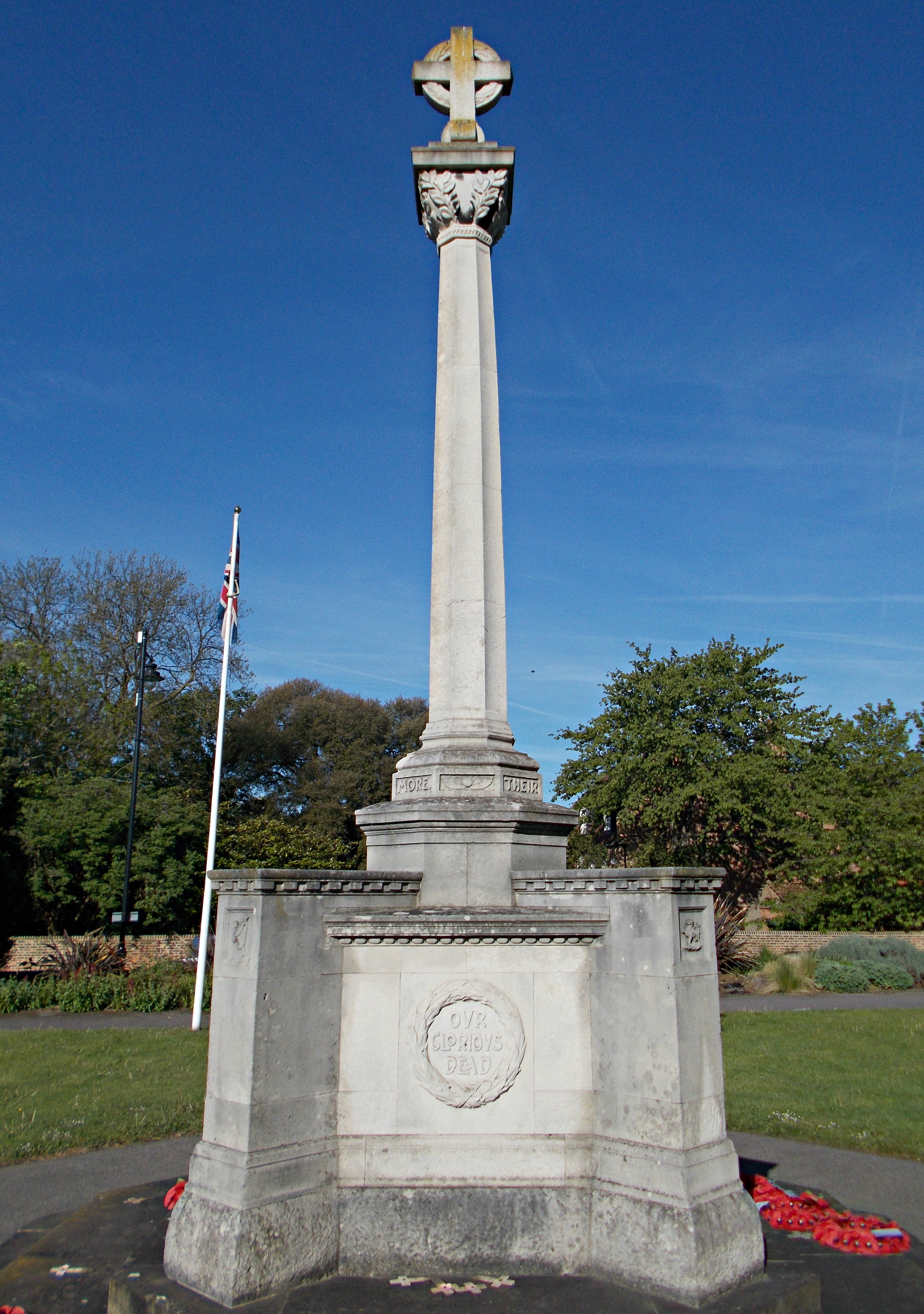
Cheam War Memorial

Close to Cheam Library and the much-rebuilt church, the memorial is to the people of Cheam who were killed during World War I, World War II and the Falklands War.

There are a number of inscriptions on the structure, including one at the 12 o'clock face which reads:

Our Glorious Dead / Their names shall endure for evermore.

It was designated a grade II listed building in December 2016.

=== The Old Cottage ===
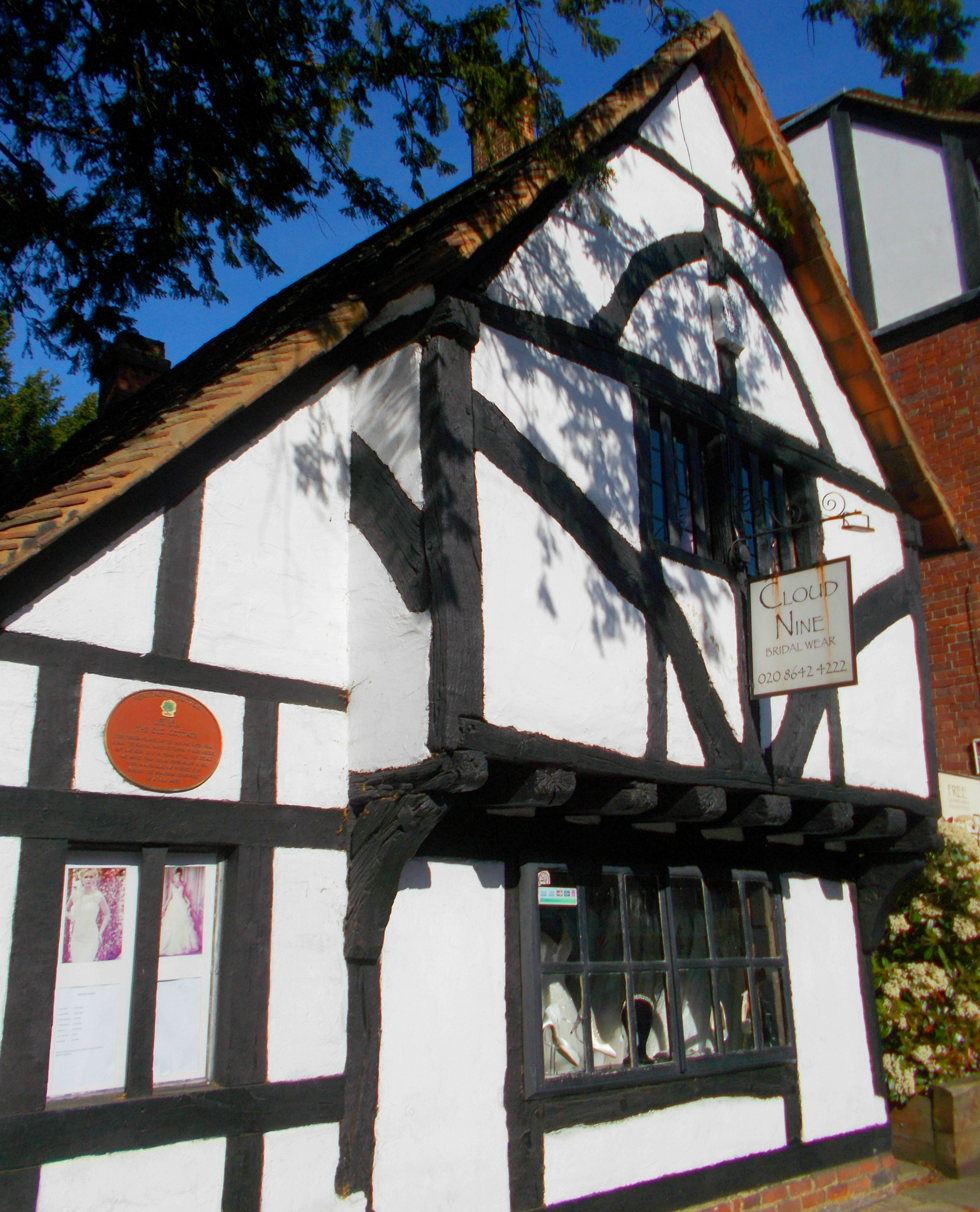
The Old Cottage, Cheam Village

The Old Cottage was built in the late 15th or early 16th century. Initially built as a cottage, it became a small brewery in the 18th century. It originally stood in the Broadway (then Malden Road) near the junction with Ewell Road. Under threat of demolition when the road was widened in 1922, it was saved by the local council, working with a local architect and historian.

The building was dismantled by removing the original wooden pins from the timber frame. The parts were then moved to the present site one hundred yards down the road and reassembled. The Old Cottage features a local historical plaque, and was used as a bridalwear shop before becoming a woolshop in 2022.

=== The Old Farmhouse ===
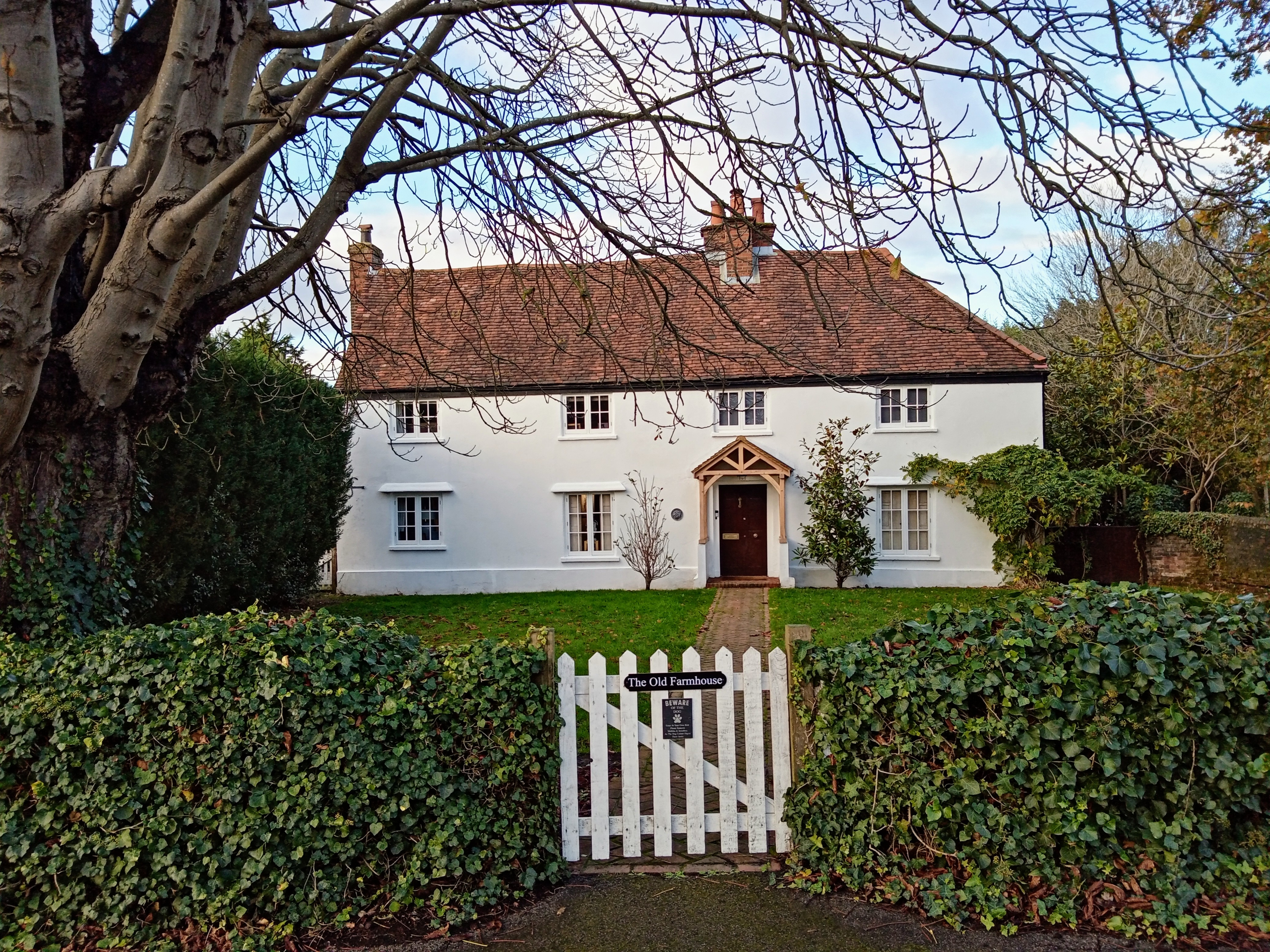
The Old Farmhouse, Cheam Village

A large timber-framed and weatherboarded yeoman farmer's house, forming part of the Cheam Conservation Area with St Dunstan's Church, Whitehall, The Old Rectory and the Lumley Chapel, the Old Farmhouse has a crown post roof and large Tudor axial chimney stack in the centre with large fireplaces. The earliest part of the house is 15th century, with several building stages extending the house in the 16th and 17th centuries, creating a Baffle House design popular in the 17th century.

Many original features remain including oak doors and hinges, window shutters and fireplaces. Much of the timber framing is exposed throughout the house. Recent excavation and ground imaging uncovered a large Tudor kitchen underneath the house with a Tudor hearth and hood visible. Access to the cellar kitchen was by a staircase going north to south, which is now under the floor of the current kitchen. A file of text and images relating to the house is available in the Conservation Archive in Sutton Library.

=== Nonsuch Mansion ===
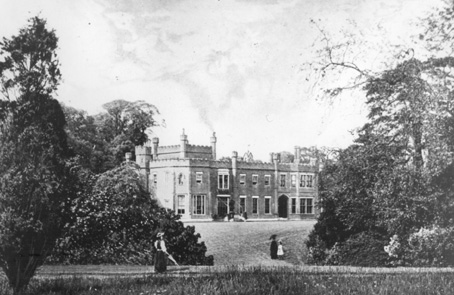
Historic view of Nonsuch Mansion

Nonsuch Mansion is a grade II listed Gothic revival mansion within Nonsuch Park. The Service Wing Museum is open to the public during the summer on Sundays. It is run by the Friends of Nonsuch, which charitable organisation also commissioned the largest model of Nonsuch Palace available. The model was created by designer Ben Taggart and can be seen throughout the year on Sundays. The mansion itself is a popular place for wedding receptions, as it is available for hire. In medieval times the land upon which Nonsuch Mansion sits was part of the 3,000 acres (1,200 ha) manor of Cuddington. The mansion was originally built in 1731–1743 by Joseph Thompson and later bought by Samuel Farmer in 1799. He employed Jeffry Wyattville to rebuild it in a Tudor Gothic style in 1802–1806. Farmer was succeeded by his grandson in 1838 under whom the gardens became famous.

Nonsuch Mansion bears a resemblance to the original design of Nonsuch Palace, whose construction was begun by King Henry VIII in the 16th century. Built within the north porch of the mansion is a block from the original Nonsuch Palace that bears an inscription which means "1543 Henry VIII in the 35th year of his reign."

== Places of worship ==
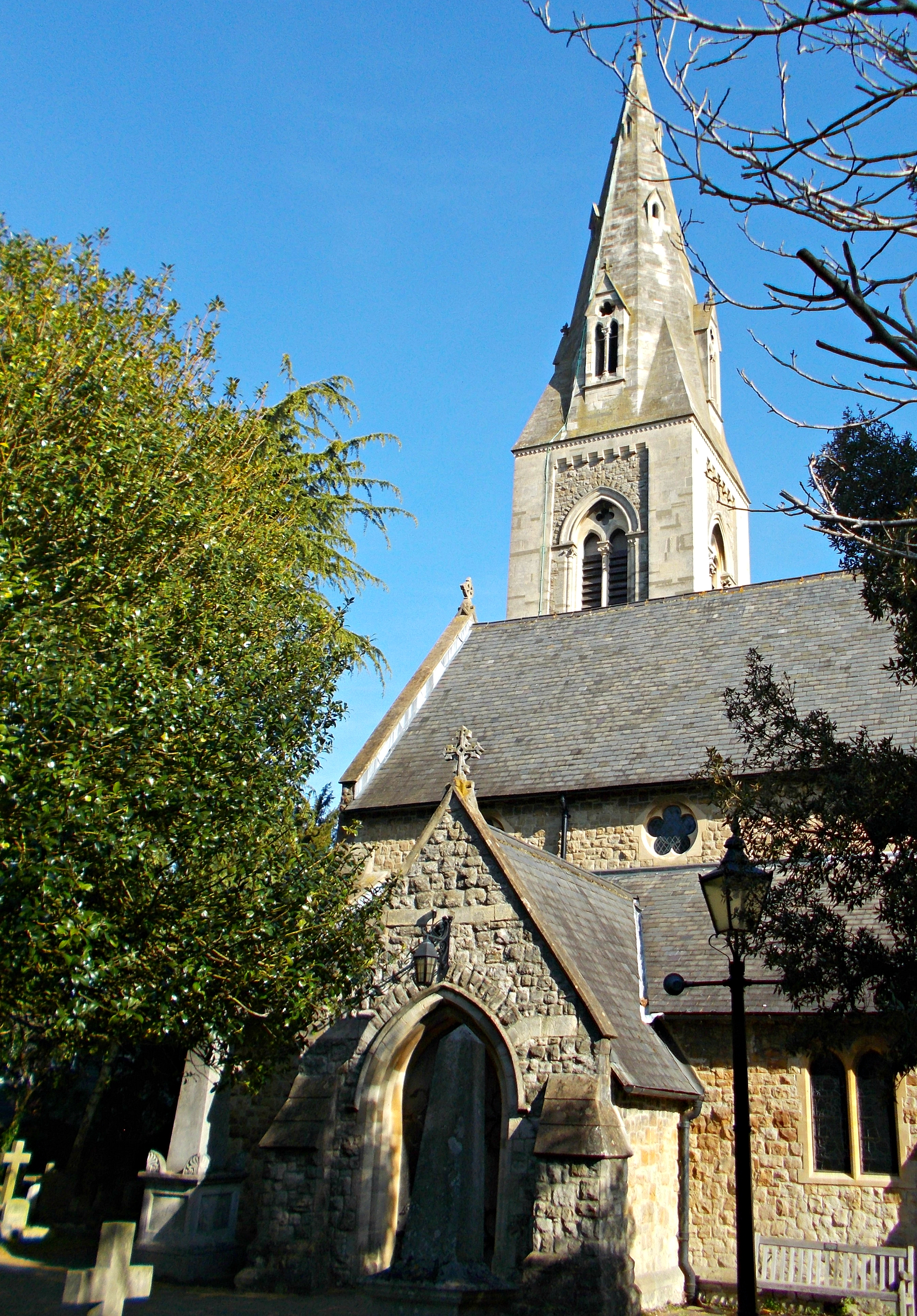
St Dunstan's Church

St Dunstan's Church is the area's parish church, situated in Cheam Village, next to Lumley Chapel. St Paul's Howell Hill is on Northey Avenue at the far west of the town, although it is actually in the borough of Epsom and Ewell. It is known locally due to its prominent presence on a roundabout and its contemporary design. Towards the eastern end of Northey Avenue is St Andrew's United Reformed Church, a grade II listed building designed by Maxwell Ayrton in 1933. Cheam Baptist Church, founded by Charles Spurgeon in 1862, is located next to St Dunstan's Church. Cheam Methodist Church is in the east of the town just off the A217 and is also home to Sutton Schoolswork, the local Christian schools charity working in the borough of Sutton.

=== St Dunstan's Church ===
The parish church of St. Dunstan is grade II* listed. It was built in Cheam Village in 1864 next to Lumley Chapel on the site of a medieval church. It was built with Kentish ragstone below pitched slate roofs, with dressings to windows and doors in Bath Stone. It was designed by F. H. Pownall in the Gothic revival architectural style, and features polychrome brickwork decoration internally. The lychgate, dated 1891, at the entrance to the churchyard, is listed Grade II. In the churchyard are three tombs which are Grade II listed.

The graveyard attached to this church was twice subject to a six-foot (1.8 m) archaeological excavation by the police, first between June and September 2012, and again from April 2013. This excavation was conducted in order to uncover evidence in the investigation into the unsolved disappearance of Lee Boxell, a fifteen-year-old local schoolboy, in 1988. The church was home to an informal youth club in the 1980s, known as 'the Shed'.

=== Lumley Chapel ===
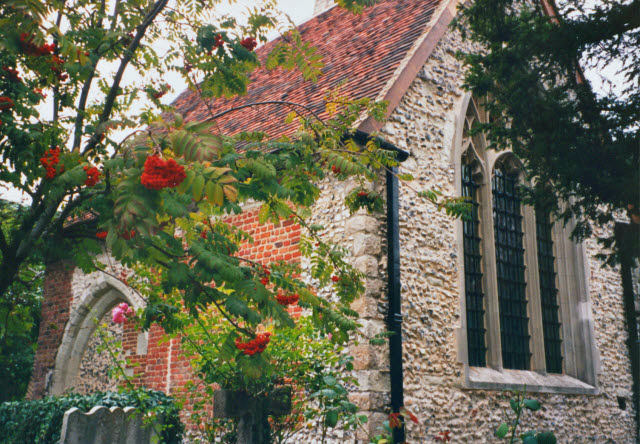
Lumley Chapel

Situated next to St Dunstan's Church, Lumley Chapel is the oldest standing building in the London Borough of Sutton, and contains many notable monuments to local families.

Following the construction of the new St Dunstan's church in 1864, the older church on the site was demolished, other than the east end of the chancel, which was retained to contain the monuments and brasses from the old church. This remnant of the former church is now known as the Lumley Chapel. It is constructed in partly roughcast rubble stone and brick, and has a gabled tile roof. The east window dates from the 15th century and has three lights. In the south wall is the blocked arcade that formerly led into the south chapel.

The remnant was declared "redundant" in 2002, and vested in the Churches Conservation Trust. It has been designated as a grade II* listed building, and is under the care of a national charity, the Churches Conservation Trust.

== Demography ==
38.2% of homes in Cheam are detached houses, 23% are semi-detached, 20.6% are flats/maisonettes/apartments, and 18.6% are terraced.

== Schools ==
There are a number of schools in Cheam, including Nonsuch High School, a grammar school for girls and Cheam High School, a large mixed comprehensive school on Chatsworth Road.

== Transport ==
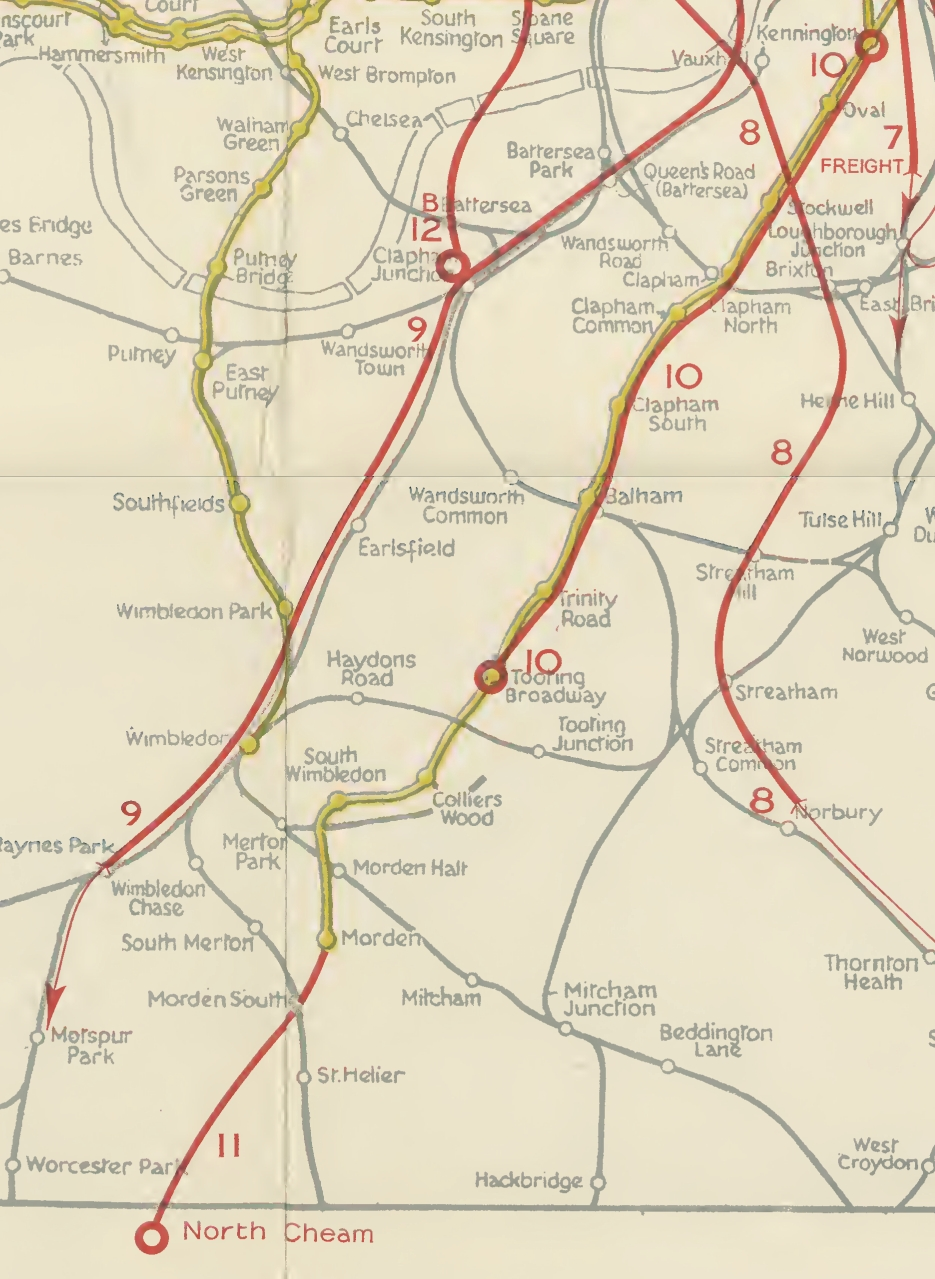
Duplication of tunnels on the Northern line and extension to North Cheam proposed in 1946

Cheam is served by Cheam station on the Sutton and Mole Valley lines between Sutton and Epsom. It is in London fare zone 5. Services from Cheam to central London include direct trains to Victoria which take about 30 minutes.

In 1910, parliamentary approval was given to the Wimbledon and Sutton Railway to construct Cheam tube station at Cheam Road, Sutton that would have been served by the London Underground's District Railway. Following negotiations between the Underground Electric Railways Company of London and the Southern Railway, the line was eventually opened in 1930 by the Southern Railway, though the station was replaced by West Sutton to its north.

In 1946, a report on London's railways to the Ministry of War Transport detailed possible new routes and rail lines for the London Underground, including the Victoria line and a route that would serve similar stations to Crossrail. The same report recommended extending the Northern line to North Cheam, contingent on doubling the tracks between Kennington and Tooting Broadway such that Charing Cross trains would terminate at Tooting Broadway, and with an intermediate station at Morden South. Both proposals would each have cost £1,500,000. The proposed site for North Cheam station would have occupied the site of what was then a Granada cinema on London Road in North Cheam, which was opened in 1937 and closed in 1969; one half was demolished to make way for a community centre car park, and the other half of which is now a Wetherspoons pub. However, as no detailed planning and application was made for permission to construct the extension — by the report's own admission, "the period required for construction, under the most favourable conditions, would not be less than 30 years" — the extension to North Cheam did not take place.

Cheam and North Cheam are served by bus routes including services 213 (Sutton to Kingston), 151 (Wallington to Worcester Park), 93 (North Cheam to Putney Bridge) and the SL7 service between Heathrow Airport and Croydon.

== In popular culture ==
In the comedy show Hancock's Half Hour, Tony Hancock lived in the fictional road Railway Cuttings, in East Cheam. Though not in existence today, East Cheam did exist officially in name and was not fictional. The census of 1841 includes the place-names East Cheam, North Cheam, Garden Green and Cheam Common.

Cheam is referred to in a rhyme dating back to the 18th century, and revised in the Victorian era to:

Sutton for good mutton;

Cheam for juicy beef;
Croydon for a pretty girl

And Mitcham for a thief.

St. Dunstan's Church was used in an episode of the TV comedy The I.T. Crowd, Series 2 ("Return of the Golden Child").

Scenes from an episode of Made in Chelsea were filmed in Nonsuch Mansion.

== Notable people ==
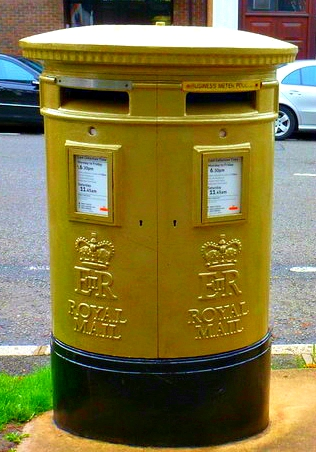
Olympic gold postbox in Cheam Village for local medal winner, Joanna Rowsell

- James Blades (1901–1999) orchestral percussionist, lived in Cheam.
- Jane Dee, Elizabethan lady-in-waiting and wife of occultist John Dee, was born in Cheam.
- Tony Hancock (1924–1968), comedian, lived in and set his sketches in Cheam
- Paul Greengrass (born 1955), film director, was born in Cheam.
- James Hunt (1947–1993), Formula One racing driver, lived in Cheam as a child and attended Ambleside School.
- Peter Manley (born 1962), darts player, was born in Cheam.
- Joanna Rowsell (born 1988), Olympic cycling gold medallist, attended Cuddington-Croft Primary School and Nonsuch High School for Girls.
- Alex Sawyer (born 1993), actor, lived in Cheam and attended The Avenue School.
- Harry Secombe (1921–2001), comedian, lived in Cheam.
- Alec Stewart (born 1963), (ex-England cricketer) lived in Cheam.
- Jeremy Vine (born 1965) (presenter) and his brother Tim Vine (born 1967) (comedian) were born in Cheam.
- Carrie Quinlan, actress, lived in Cheam and attended Nonsuch High School for Girls.
- Suzannah Lipscomb (born 1978), historian, lived in Cheam and attended Nonsuch High School for Girls.
