= Little Bookham =

Village in Surrey, England

Coordinates: 51.28°N 0.39°W

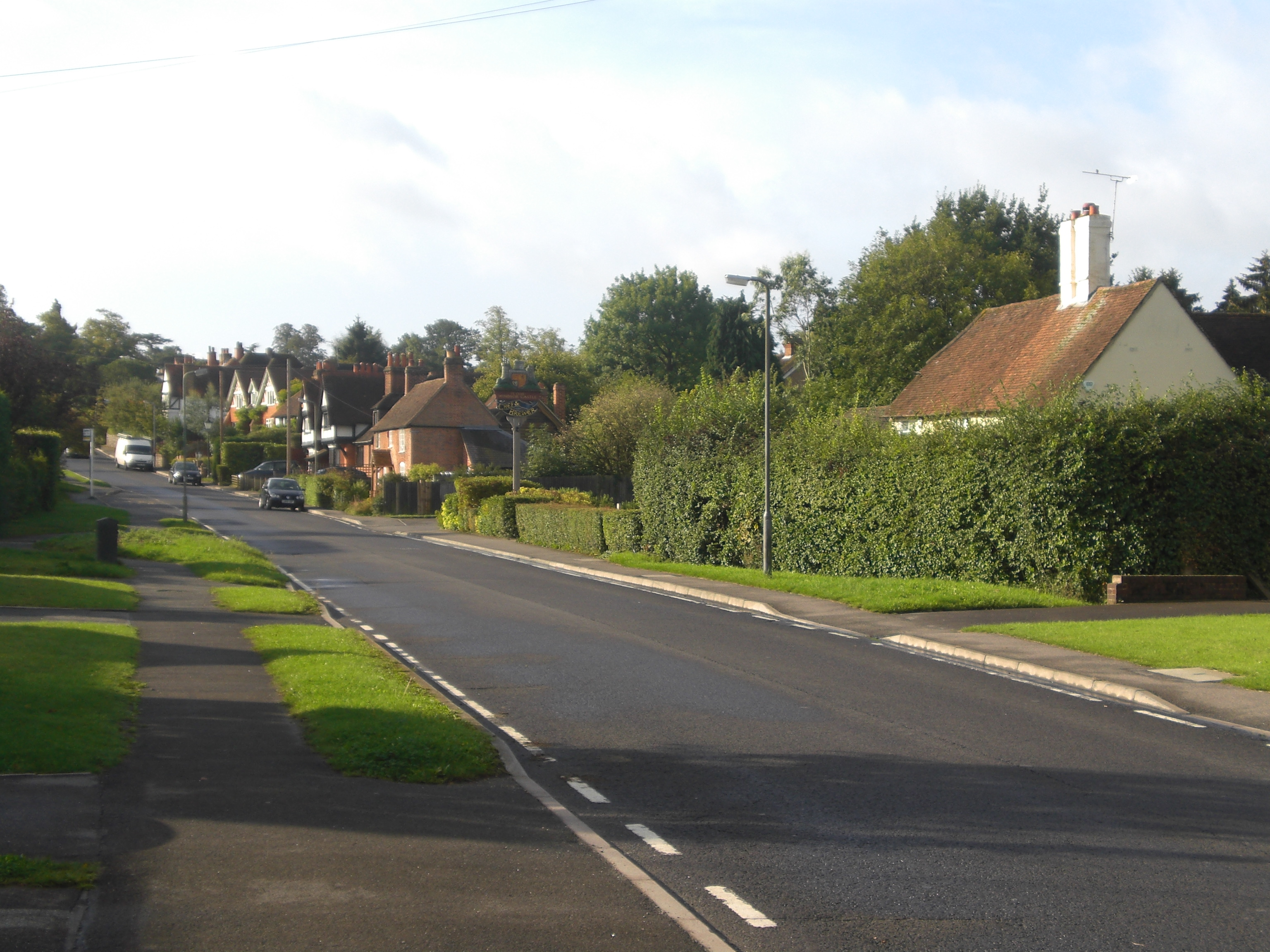
- Cottages and Ye Olde Windsor Castle Pub, Little Bookham Street

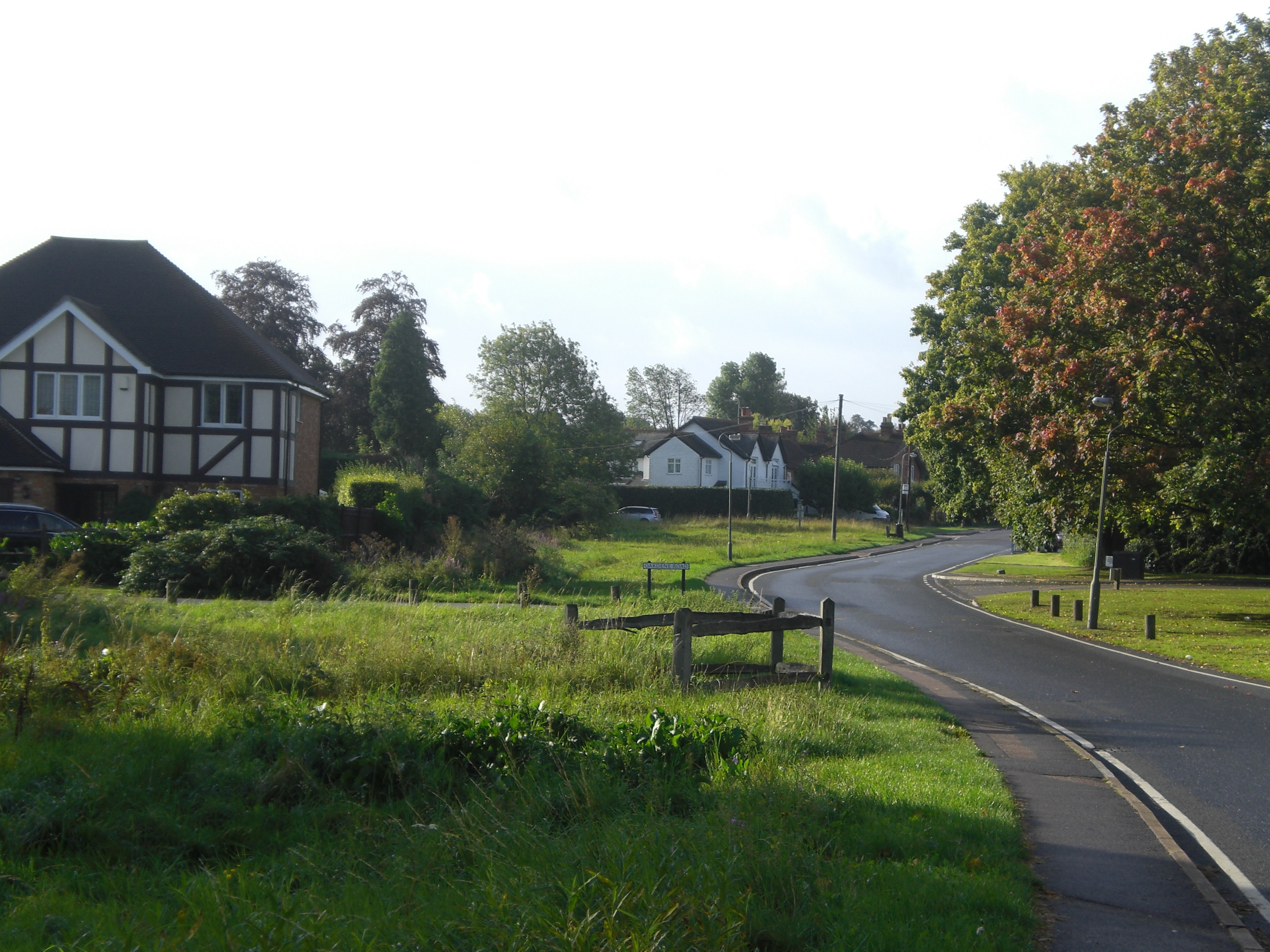
- View in opposite direction.

- Location within Surrey
- Population: 11,375 (2011 Census. Bookham North and South Wards, covering Great and Little Bookham
- OS grid reference: TQ1254
- District: Mole Valley
- Shire county: Surrey
- Region: South East
- Country: England
- Sovereign state: United Kingdom
- Post town: Leatherhead
- Postcode district: KT23
- Dialling code: 01372
- Police: Surrey
- Fire: Surrey
- Ambulance: South East Coast
- UK Parliament: Dorking and Horley

Little Bookham is a village in the Mole Valley district, in Surrey, England between Great Bookham and Effingham. It is home to more than seven pre-1800 listed buildings, mostly in a large conservation area, Of note are a large pub-restaurant, Manor House School, and All Saints' Church. The village is centred immediately north of the North Downs and is contiguous with Great Bookham, the two divisions of Bookham having been made in the early medieval period. The shared 21st century, rustic and tree-emblazoned village sign states 'Little and Great' in small print above its crested Bookham much larger font base ribbon, just as both 'villages' share in most of their amenities.

== Geography ==
This is an extremely narrow strip parish, reaching the far, uppermost point of the ridge, before its steep south slopes of the North Downs, specifically a tranche of Ranmore Common. It is no longer a civil parish. It is also no longer its own ecclesiastical parish, since the parish concepts were split apart in England in the 19th century, as has been merged in the Church of England with Effingham, the church of which is 580 metres (0.36 mi) west of its own church.

== History ==
Little Bookham coloured orange, map of 1884.

It is difficult to conjecture when the parish of Little Bookham was formed. The first documentary evidence can be found after the conversion of England to Christianity in the 7th century. The Venerable Bede states that Erconwald, who became Bishop of London in 674, founded the Benedictine Abbey of Saint Peter, Chertsey in 666, and Frithuwald, who was sub-king or regent of Surrey, joined in the grant endowing the abbey with certain lands.

Frithuwald, however, seems to have been the subject at that time of Ecgberht, King of Kent, and the charter is stated to have been confirmed by Wulfhere, King of Mercia, to whom the overlordship of Surrey must have been passed before his death in 675. It has been stated that the monastery was first built under King Egbert.

According to a charter C.675, the original of which is lost but which exists in a later form, there was granted to the Abbey twenty dwellings at Bocham with Effingham. This was confirmed by four Saxon kings; Offa, "King of the Mercians and of the nations roundabout" in 787; Æthelstan who was "King and ruler of the whole island of Britain" in 933 confirmed the privileges to the monastery; King Edgar, "Emperor of all Britain" in 967 confirmed "twelve mansiones" in Bocham, and King Edward the Confessor, "King of the English" in 1062 confirmed twenty mansae at Bocham cum Effingham (Note: [and] Driteham and Pechingeorde which are holdings in the Domesday Book and appear to have been absorbed into the manors of Effingham and Effingham East Court).

Little Bookham lay within the Anglo-Saxon administrative district of Effingham half hundred.

It appears in the Domesday Book of 1086 as one of two entries for Bocheham. Its Domesday Assets were: 2 hides; 2 ploughs, 4 acres (1.6 ha) of meadow, herbage and pannage worth 11 hogs. It rendered (in total): £3.

Parts of the present parish of Effingham, however, lying to the east of Effingham Common Road at one time belonged to the parish of Little Bookham. The charters of Frithwald, Offa, Edgar and Edward the Confessor are all believed to be substantially fabricated, but probably embodied authentic material or recorded an earlier genuine transaction. These charters were probably written at a later date than stated in order to confirm a position which was thought to have existed at that earlier date. The Charter of Æthelstan is believed to be complete fabrication.

It seems probable, as the number of cottages in Bocham cum Effingham remained constant, that the later charters must have been copies of earlier ones unrevised to accord with the actual number of cottages.

In 1951 the civil parish had a population of 650. On 1 April 1974 the parish was abolished.

== The Old Rectory 1939-1945 ==
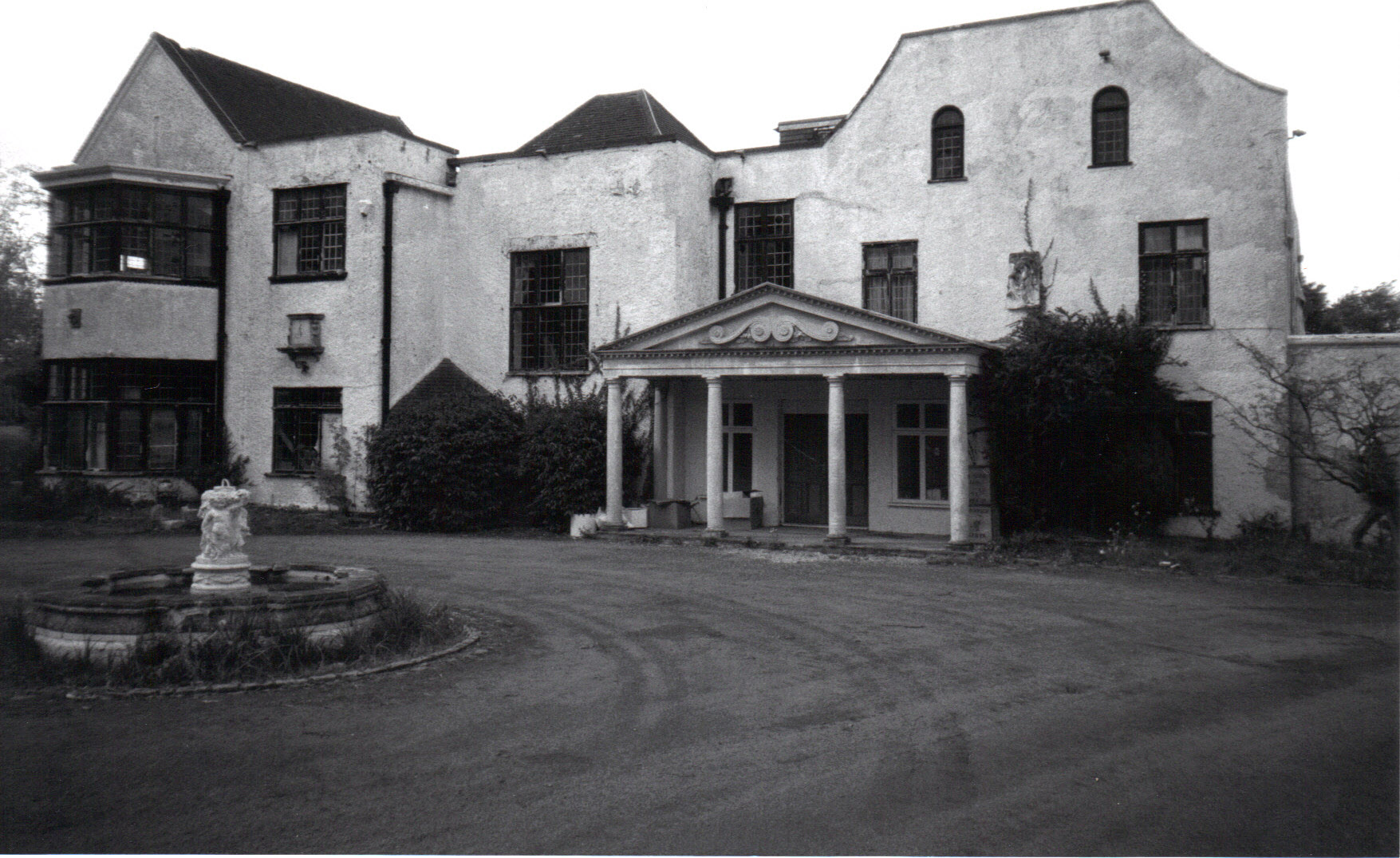
Old Rectory in 2001 when derelict

The last King and Queen of Yugoslavia (Peter II of Yugoslavia and Alexandra), second and third cousins of the reigning king, were evacuated to the Old Rectory during the Second World War, now partly redeveloped into six houses.

== Domesday Book record ==
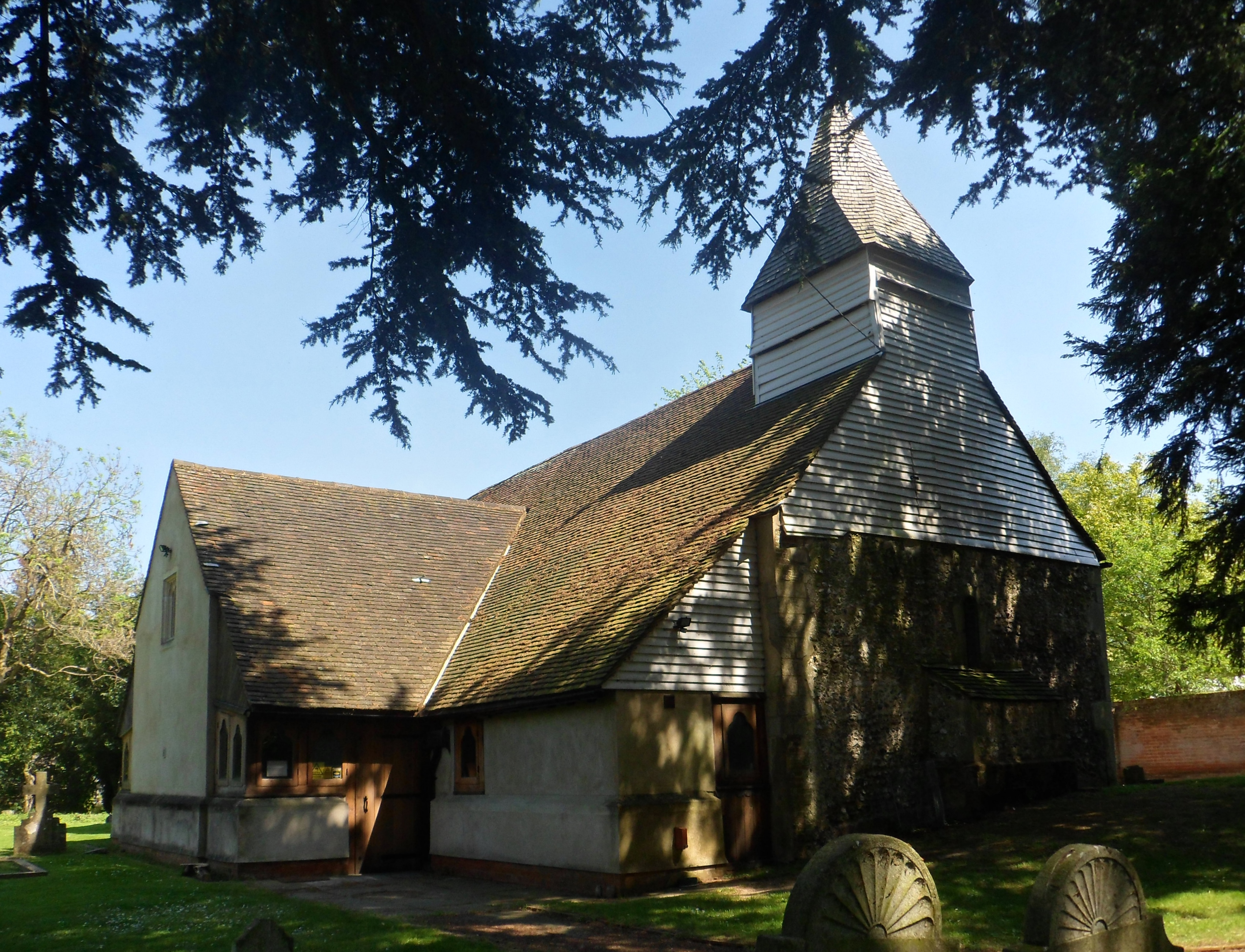
All Saints' Church

The Domesday Book of 1086, which was a survey for taxation purposes taking testimony for 20 years prior and its year of surveying, makes the first known distinction between the parishes of Great and Little Bookham. As the survey makes no entry for a church in the relevant manor believed to be specifically Little Bookham, its church must have been built later and manorial data is consistent with the parish of Little Bookham, likely a strip parish cut from the parish of Bookham, by which both Bookham entries were recorded. As recently as 1824, conveyancing deeds giving the abstracts of title to prove long-established title give a deliberately antiquated parcels clause and preamble to match older records, stating "in Great Bookham in the parish of Bookham".

The Domesday survey refers to the manor of Little Bookham being held by Halsard (of William de Braose, Lord of Bramber). (Note: Feudal overload of many manors) The manor remained in the Halsard or Hansard family until about 1291. It would seem, therefore, that Little Bookham Parish Church was an amenity built on their land by benefaction of the Hansard family about 1100, probably at first their manorial chapel. It gained its first dedication in 1986 – to All Saints – and is a Grade II* listed building.

== Little Bookham postal locality ==
Queen's Diamond Jubilee village sign

Following a petition attracting enough signatories to be published the district council's website. As of April 2020, Royal Mail recognises Little Bookham and Great Bookham as fully databased localities; localities are optional features of addresses.

== See also ==
- Bookham Commons
- Great Bookham
- Manor House School, Little Bookham
