= Carshalton Urban District =

Local government district in England

Coordinates: 51.3646°N 0.1620°W

Carshalton
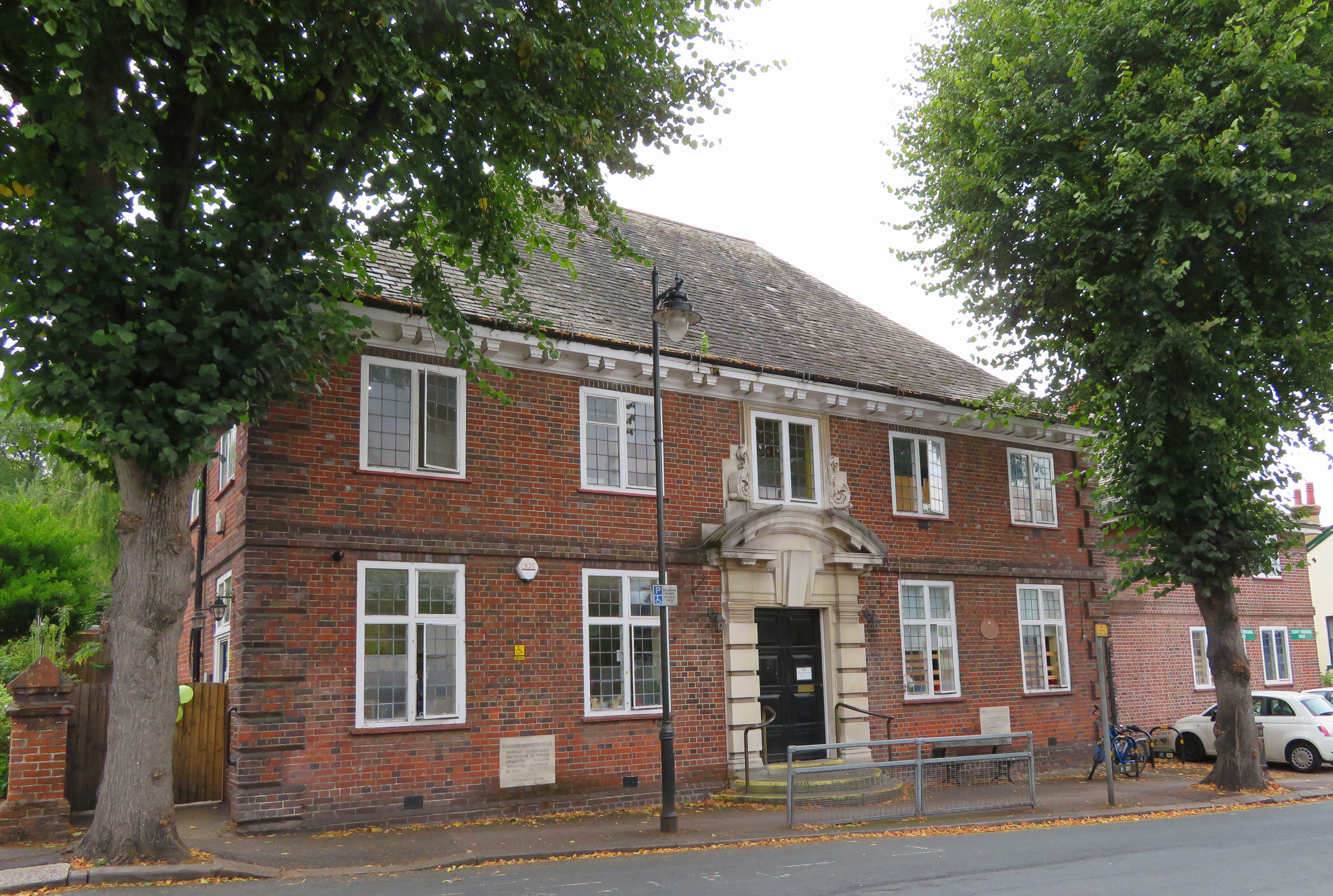
- Carshalton Council Offices
- Area
  - 1911: 2,926 acres (11.8 km^{2})
  - 1961: 3,346 acres (13.5 km^{2})
- Population
  - 1901: 6,746
  - 1961: 57,484
- History
  - Created: 1883
  - Abolished: 1965
  - Succeeded by: London Borough of Sutton
- Status: local government district 1883 - 1894 urban district from 1894
- Government
  - HQ: The Square, Carshalton (later the local library)
  - Motto: Animo et Fide (By Courage and Faith)

Carshalton was a local government district in north east Surrey from 1883 to 1965 around the town of Carshalton.

The parish of Carshalton adopted the Local Government Act 1858 in 1883 and a local board was formed to govern the town. The Local Government Act 1894 reconstituted the area as an urban district, and an elected urban district council replaced the local board. In 1933 the boundaries of the district were altered after the abolition of Epsom Rural District.

The district was abolished in 1965 by the London Government Act 1963 and the former area was transferred to Greater London to be combined with that of other districts to form the present-day London Borough of Sutton.

Carshalton Urban District Council were granted armorial bearings by the College of Arms on 14 May 1952. The basic colours of the shield were gold and red, from the arms of the Mandeville family who anciently held the manor of Carshalton. The chevron in the centre of the arms was derived from the arms of the Gaynesford and Scawen families. On the chevron was placed a heraldic fountain for the many springs and pools of the town, with on either side a silver sprig of oak. The oak sprigs came from the arms of Surrey County Council. The lions appeared in the arms of three local families: Burgersh, Fellowes and Hardwick. The greyhound was from the Gaynesford family arms, and also depicted the historic Greyhound Inn. The crest above the shield featured a mural crown as symbol of local government. On this was placed a Tudor rose, the symbol of the UDC prior to 1952. From the crown rose a swan, based on the Bohun swan, the heraldic badge of the Bohun family. In the swan's beak was a sprig of beech symbolising Carshalton Beeches.

The council met in the Carshalton Council Offices in The Square. The building has been Grade II listed since 1974.
