= Cuddington, Surrey =

Former village in Surrey, England

Coordinates: 51.357°N 0.232°W

Cuddington
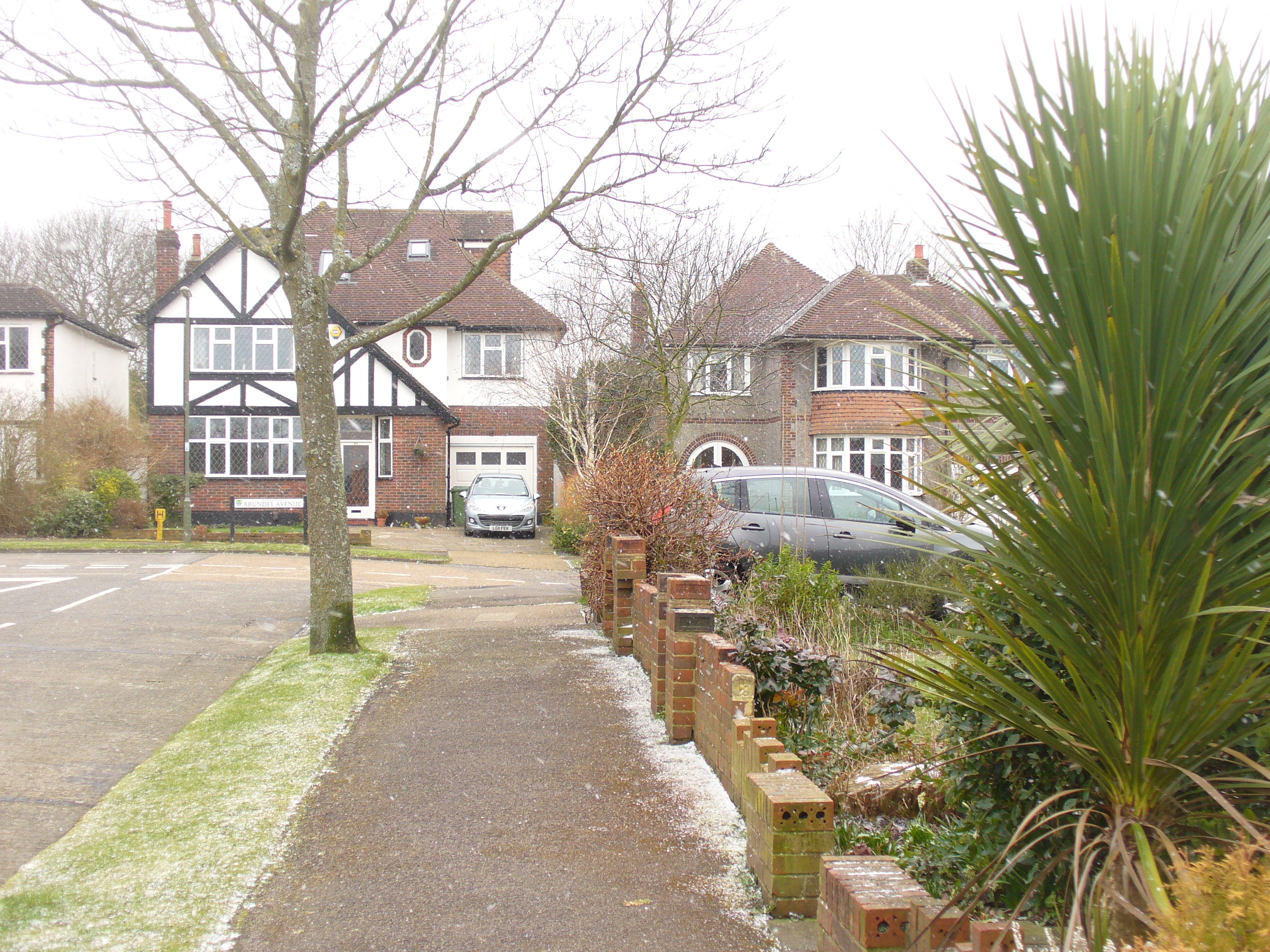
- Suburban Ewell, in the former parish

- Location within Surrey
- District: Epsom and Ewell
- Shire county: Surrey
- Region: South East
- Country: England
- Sovereign state: United Kingdom
- UK Parliament: Epsom and Ewell; Sutton and Cheam

Cuddington is an area located in the southwestern extreme shared between London Borough of Sutton and Banstead, Surrey.

Historically fully in Surrey, the village of Cuddington was demolished to make way for Henry VIII's Nonsuch Palace near Cheam. Cuddington lay within the Copthorne hundred. There remains a small rise of land to mark the northern side of the old Cuddington parish church.

The parish of Cuddington was part of Epsom Rural District and became part of the borough of Epsom and Ewell in 1933, with portions to the northeast and south becoming part of Cheam. In 1951 the parish had a population of 11,433. On 1 April 1974 the parish was abolished.

== History ==
Cuddington lay within the Copthorne hundred, a strategic and judicial division predominantly used in Anglo Saxon England to supplement the county and parish (see vestry).

In the Middle Ages the estates of Cuddington extended over 1,859 acres (752 ha), the southern part being upon the chalk downs, the centre on the Woolwich and Thanet beds, the rest upon the London clay. There was no ecclesiastical parish; the land was taxed with Ewell, but separately rated, with its own overseers.

It appears in Domesday Book of 1086 as Codintone. Its domesday assets were: 5 hides; 1 mill worth 3 shillings; and 9 ploughs. It rendered £9 12s. Its total population was recorded as 28 households.

Henry VIII purchased the manor in 1538 from Richard Codington, who was the heir to his father's estate, and Elizabeth, Richard's wife (as was typical added as a trustee to override any interests she otherwise could have claimed for their offspring).

The whole of the former village of Cuddington, with its mansion and church, were swept away by Henry VIII to make room for the palace afterwards known as Nonsuch, and its two parks — the Great Park or Worcester Park containing 911 acres (369 ha), and the Little Park containing 671 acres (272 ha), part of which remains and part of which has been converted to residential areas of Ewell and Cheam. The palace was never fully completed by Henry VIII but was sufficient under Mary I of England to be used by Keeper of the Banqueting House, Sir Thomas Cawarden to entertain Gilles de Noailles, the French Ambassador. The Tudor period historian and classical civilisation connoisseur John Leland praised the palace's design in Latin verse.

After the destruction of Nonsuch in 1671–2, the area was taken over by neighbouring farms. In 1959–60, stone from the parish church was uncovered, revealing that the palace inner courtyard had been built around the foundations, on top of the former graveyard. Several outbuildings belonging to the medieval manor house were also located during these excavations. The archaeologists also concluded that Vicarage Lane had formed part of the road between Cuddington and Ewell, to the south west.

The church of St Philip, Cheam Common, was built in 1876, and an ecclesiastical parish was formed for it in 1906 officially from "Cheam and Cuddington parish" however the latter term was long out of use and dropped by the Church of England.
