= Queen Mary's Park =

English public park in Carshalton Beeches

Coordinates: 51.349°N 0.170°W

Queen Mary's Park is a small public park in Carshalton Beeches, in the London Borough of Sutton.

It is situated on the old site of Queen Mary's hospital.

== History ==
While the site was a hospital, a model railway was constructed; evidence of which, can still be seen.
