= London Borough of Sutton =

Borough in London, England

- London borough
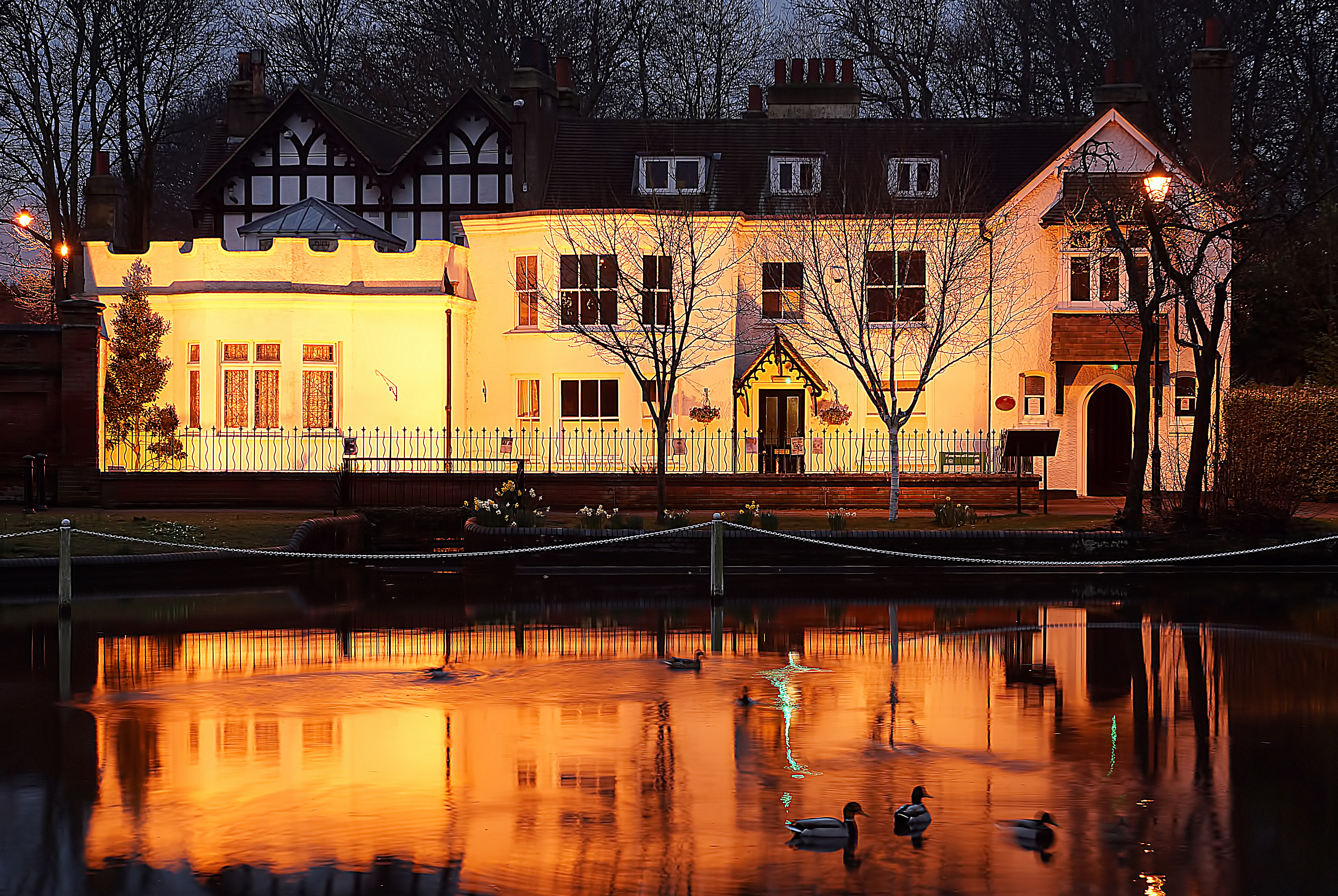
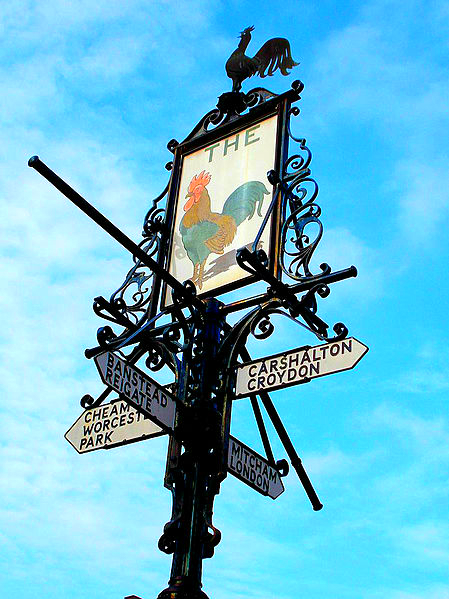
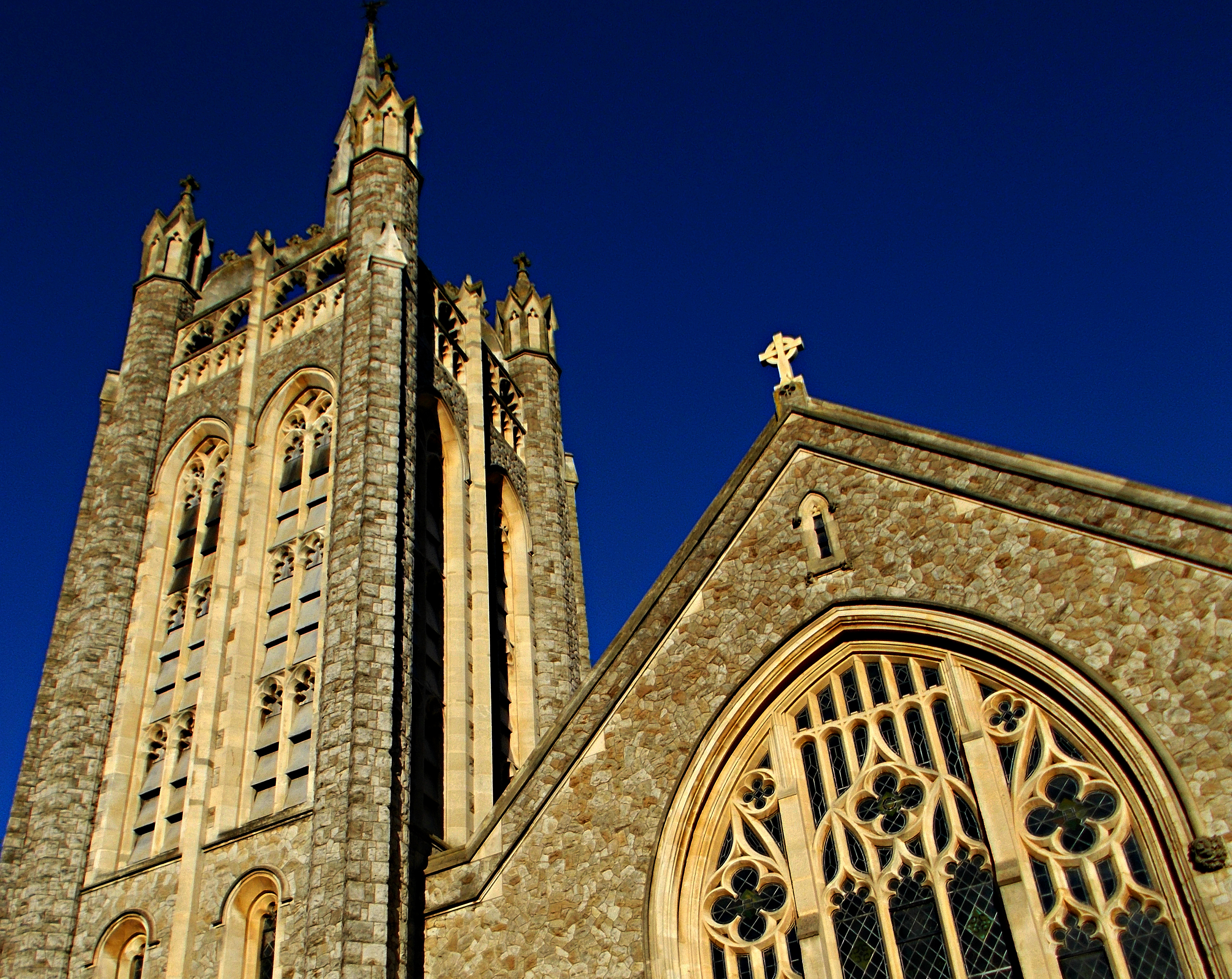
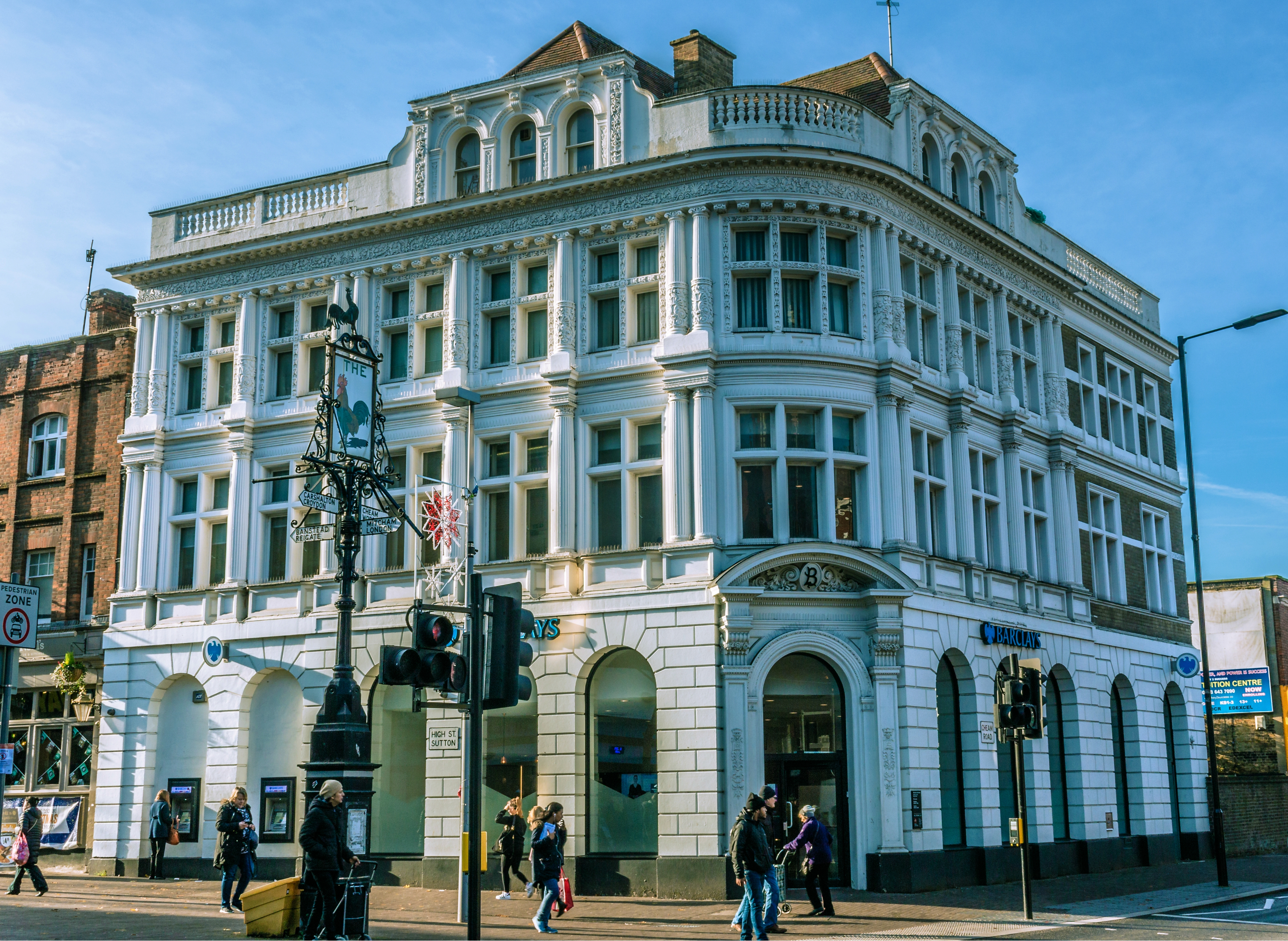
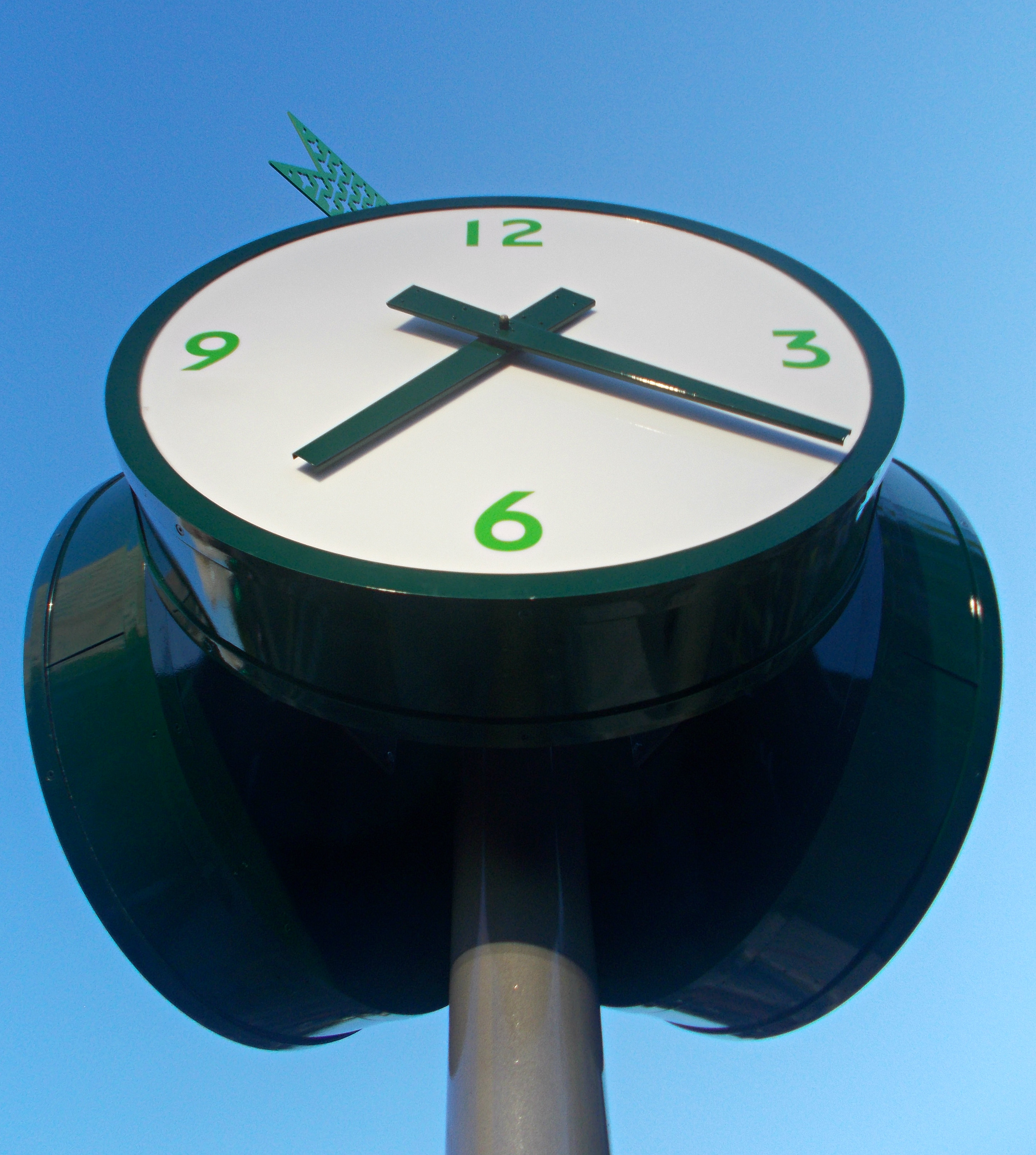
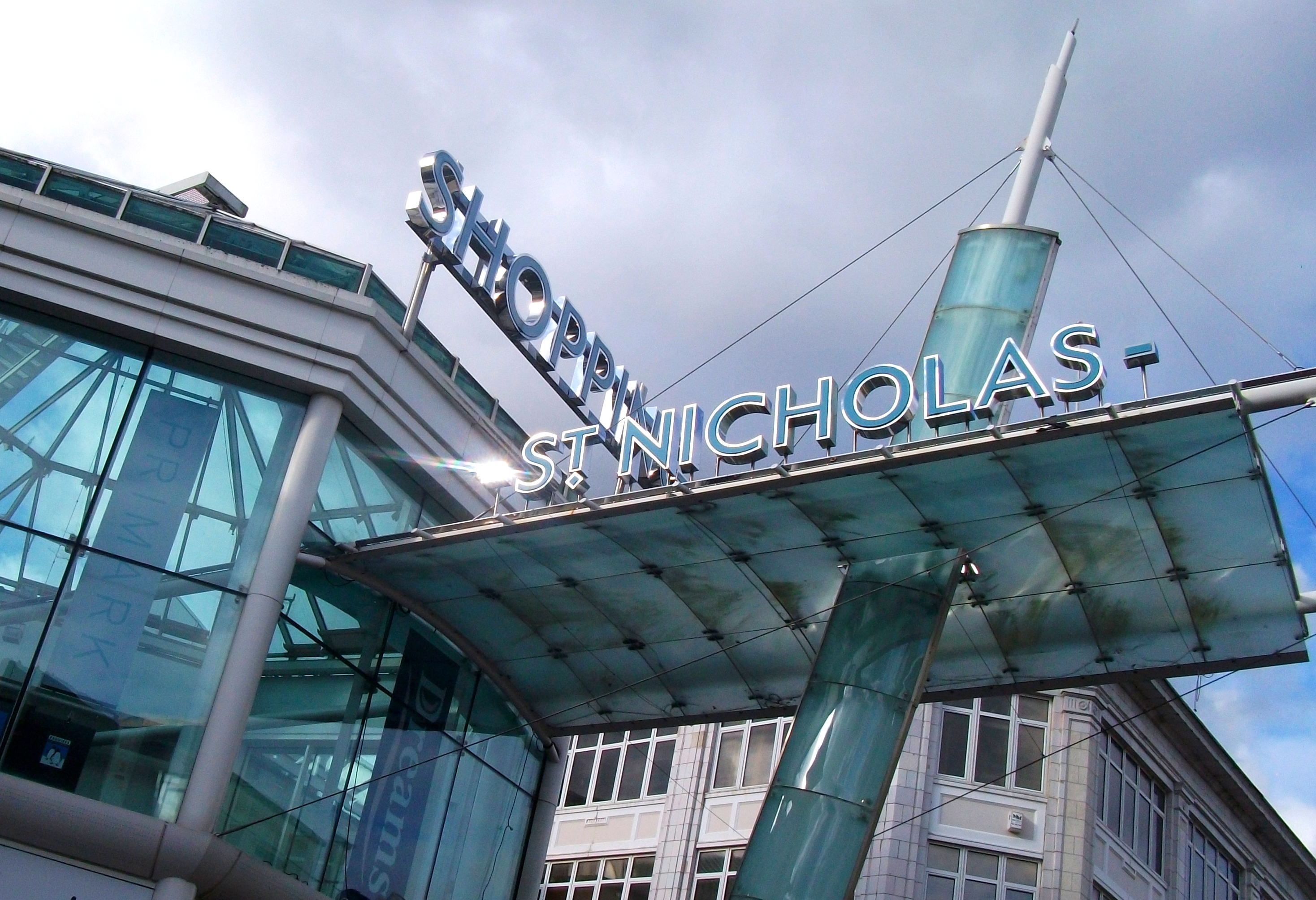
- Honeywood House Museum, Carshalton The Cock Sign Trinity Church The Barclays Bank Building Sutton Station Clock St Nicholas Shopping Centre

- Coat of arms Council logo
- Motto(s): Per adua in fide servite Deo "Through difficulties serve God in faith"
- Sutton shown within Greater London
- Interactive map of London Borough of Sutton
- Sovereign state: United Kingdom
- Constituent country: England
- Region: London
- Ceremonial county: Greater London
- Created: 1 April 1965
- Ancient settlements: c. 4000 BC (Neolithic settlements)
- Roman presence: c. 1st century AD (Roman villa in Beddington)
- Anglo-Saxon period: c. 7th century AD (First recorded mention of Sutton)
- Modern Development: 19th century (Transformation into a residential district)
- Admin HQ: Sutton

Government
  - Type: London borough council
  - Body: Sutton London Borough Council
  - London Assembly: Neil Garratt (CON) AM for Croydon and Sutton
  - MPs: Bobby Dean (Liberal Democrat); Luke Taylor (Liberal Democrat)

Area
  - Total: 16.93 sq mi (43.85 km^{2})
  - Rank: 253rd (of 296)

Population (2021 United Kingdom census)
  - Total: 209,602
  - Rank: 93rd (of 296)
  - Density: 12,380/sq mi (4,780/km^{2})
- Time zone: UTC (GMT)
  - Summer (DST): UTC+1 (BST)
- Postcodes: CR, KT, SM
- Area code: 020
- ISO 3166 code: GB-STN
- ONS code: 00BF
- GSS code: E09000029
- Police: Metropolitan Police
- Website: http://www.sutton.gov.uk/

The London Borough of Sutton is an Outer London borough in south London, England. It covers an area of 43 km^{2} (17 sq mi) and is the 80th largest local authority in England by population. It borders the London Borough of Croydon to the east, the London Borough of Merton to the north and the Royal Borough of Kingston upon Thames to the north-west; it also borders the Surrey boroughs of Epsom and Ewell to the west and Reigate and Banstead to the south. The local authority is Sutton London Borough Council. Its principal town is Sutton.

The borough has had some of the schools with the best results in the country.

Low levels of recorded crime have been a feature of the borough, being among the lowest in London.

The London Borough of Sutton was one of the four "vanguard areas" selected in 2010 for the Big Society initiative.

== History ==
The area of the modern borough broadly corresponds to the five ancient parishes of Beddington, Carshalton, Cheam, Sutton and Wallington, all of which were historically in the county of Surrey.

The parish of Sutton was made a local government district in 1882. The neighbouring parish of Carshalton was made a local government district the following year. Such districts were reconstituted as urban districts under the Local Government Act 1894. Another urban district was created in 1915 covering the two parishes of Beddington and Wallington.

The Sutton Urban District was enlarged in 1928 to take in the neighbouring parish of Cheam, at which point the urban district was renamed 'Sutton and Cheam'. It was then incorporated to become a municipal borough in 1934. Beddington and Wallington Urban District became a municipal borough in 1937.

The modern London Borough of Sutton was created in 1965 under the London Government Act 1963, covering the combined area of the former Municipal Borough of Sutton and Cheam, Carshalton Urban District and Municipal Borough of Beddington and Wallington. The area was transferred from Surrey to Greater London to become one of the 32 London Boroughs.

The 2014 Family Hotspots Report, on the best places in England and Wales for families to live, placed three areas within the borough among the top 10 places in London. The areas were identified as postcodes SM1, SM2 (Sutton town) and SM3 (Cheam). A Rightmove study in 2015 found that Sutton was the fourth happiest borough in which to live out of 33 in London. It achieved the same placing in the 2016 survey. A Trust for London and New Policy Institute report noted that Sutton had the highest rate in London of pupils achieving 5 A* – C GCSEs. In December 2014 Sutton was described by a senior Government official as the most "normal place in Britain". In connection with this, the leader of Sutton Council described the borough as "quietly brilliant", and noted that 91% of residents say it is "a great place to live".

An Ipsos MORI poll in 2014 found that 97% of residents felt safe in the borough during the day, and 71% felt safe at night, a higher figure than in 2011.

In 2014, a survey by eMoov (Property Hot Spot Index) found Sutton to be the easiest place in the country in which to sell a property. It was shown in a national detailed Land Use Survey by the Office for National Statistics in 2005 that the London Borough of Sutton had the highest proportion of land taken up by gardens, 35.1%, of any district in England.

== Districts ==
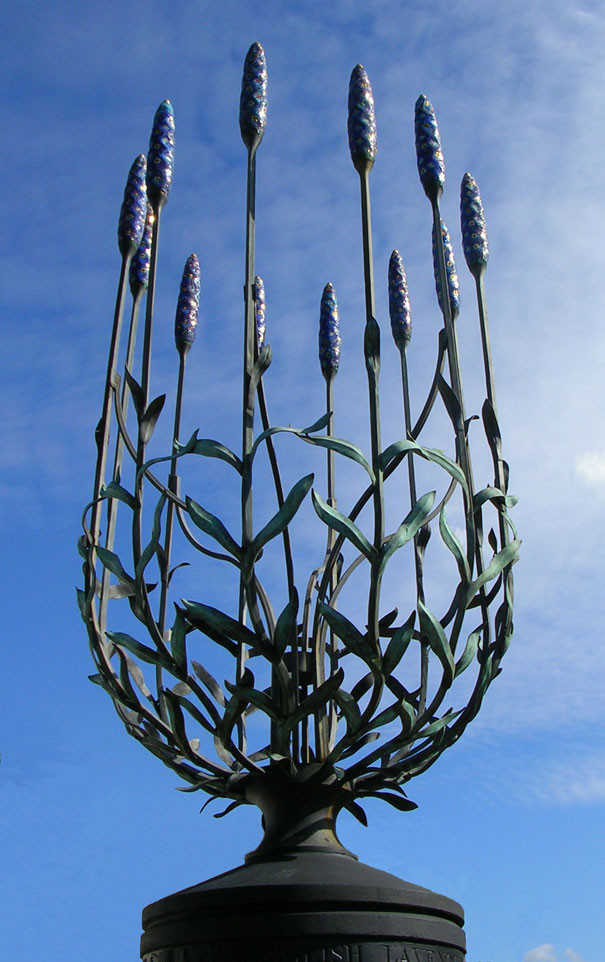
Sculpture representing lavender, gathered in the borough's lavender fields

Sutton includes the areas:

- Bandon Hill
- Beddington
- Belmont
- Benhilton
- Carshalton
- Carshalton Beeches
- Carshalton on the Hill
- Cheam
- Hackbridge
- Little Woodcote
- North Cheam
- Rosehill
- St. Helier
- South Beddington
- Sutton (principal town)
- Sutton Common
- Sutton High Street (located within Sutton)
- The Wrythe
- Wallington
- Woodcote Green
- Worcester Park

== Governance ==
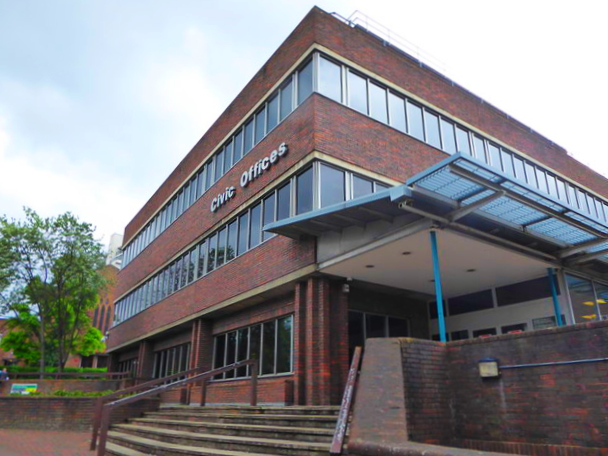
Sutton Civic Offices: Council's headquarters

The local authority is Sutton Council, based at the Civic Offices on St Nicholas Way in Sutton.

=== Greater London representation ===
Since 2000, for elections to the London Assembly, the borough forms part of the Croydon and Sutton constituency. The seat has only returned assembly members from the Conservative Party and the current member is Neil Garratt.

=== UK Parliament ===
Sutton is divided into two parliamentary constituencies, Sutton and Cheam and Carshalton and Wallington with one member of Parliament each:

Party	Member of Parliament	Constituency
Liberal Democrats	Luke Taylor, replaced Paul Scully in the 2024 General Election	Sutton and Cheam
Liberal Democrats	Bobby Dean, replaced Conservative Elliot Colburn in the 2024 General Election	Carshalton and Wallington

== Culture and leisure ==
Descriptions of a selection of the borough's cultural institutions and attractions are set out below.

=== The Sound Lounge ===
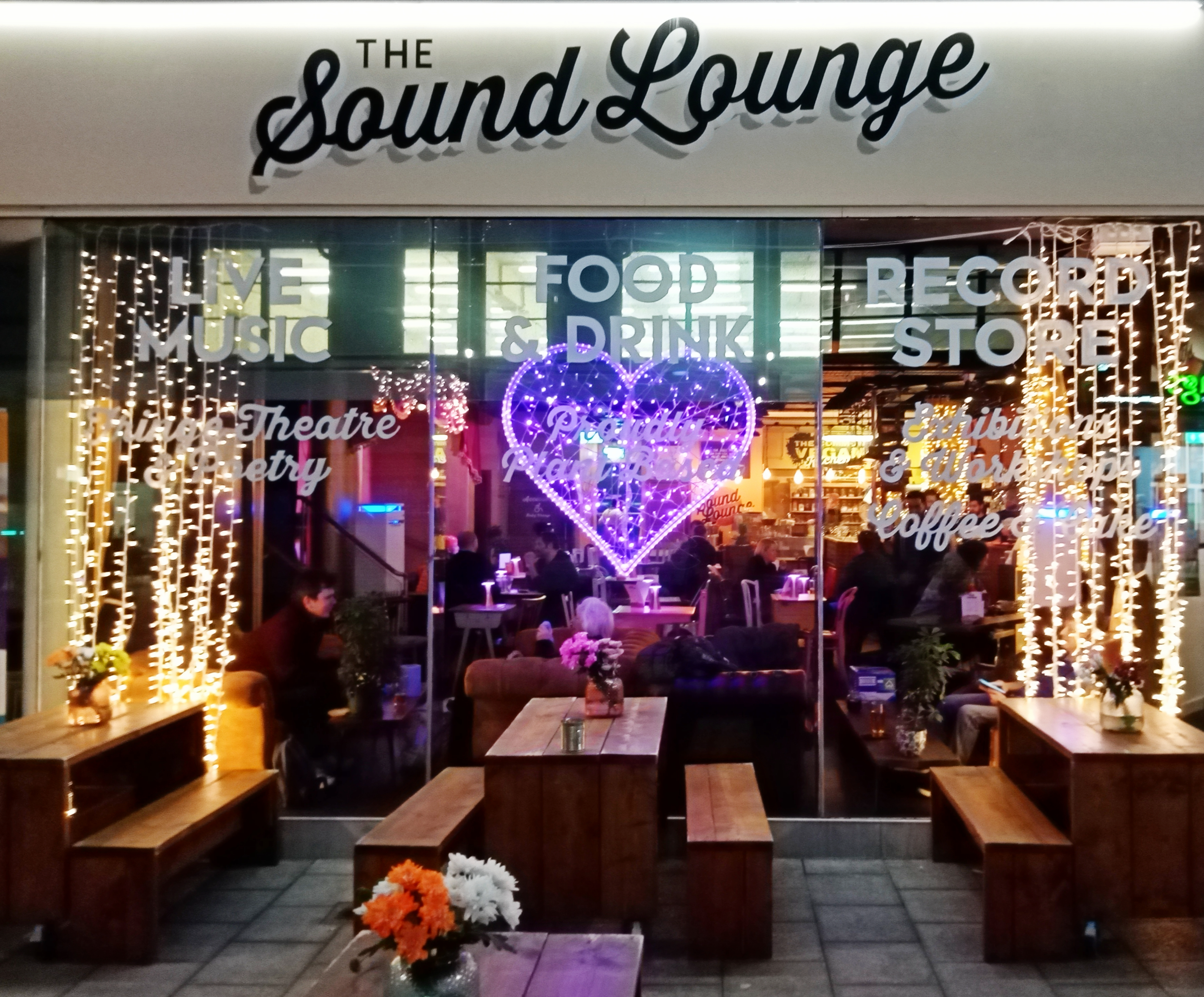
The Sound Lounge, Sutton High Street

The Sound Lounge, a grassroots concert venue, opened in December 2020 in Sutton High Street in the former premises of Royal Bank of Scotland. It hosts live performances of blues, Americana, folk and roots music. The venue includes a plant-based, carbon-neutral café, and hosts visual art exhibitions, theatre and dance. The site also incorporates a vinyl record shop (one of two branches of the Union Music Store).

In July 2021 the venue became the country's first grassroots music venue to be certified as carbon neutral. A wide variety of measures have been put in place to achieve neutrality. In addition to the fully plant-based menu for the café, these include getting all energy from renewable sources, not sending any waste to landfill and maintaining an allotment garden on site for zero-carbon produce for the café.

=== The Charles Cryer Theatre, Carshalton ===
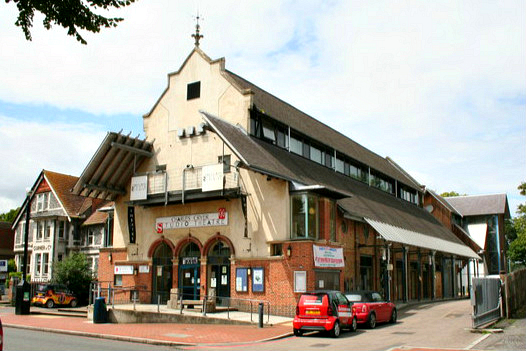
Charles Cryer Theatre, Carshalton

The Charles Cryer Studio Theatre is situated on the High Street (number 39) in Carshalton Village. It was opened by Prince Edward in 1991. As well as drama and musicals, productions included comedy and dance. With material ranging from Shakespeare to Chekov to panto and children's favourites, the theatre's aim was to balance popularity with quality. The theatre also served as a concert venue for local bands and played host to the popular local Rockshot festival. The theatre is named after the man who led the campaign to open the Secombe Theatre, Sutton, listed below. In August 2016 Sutton Theatres Trust, which owned the theatre, went into administration and it closed. However, at a meeting in October 2018, the local council confirmed that the theatre would be brought back into use, following a successful bid to run the venue (on a 25-year lease) by Cryer Arts Ltd. The company plans a range of events, including music, film and theatre.

=== The Secombe Theatre, Sutton town centre ===
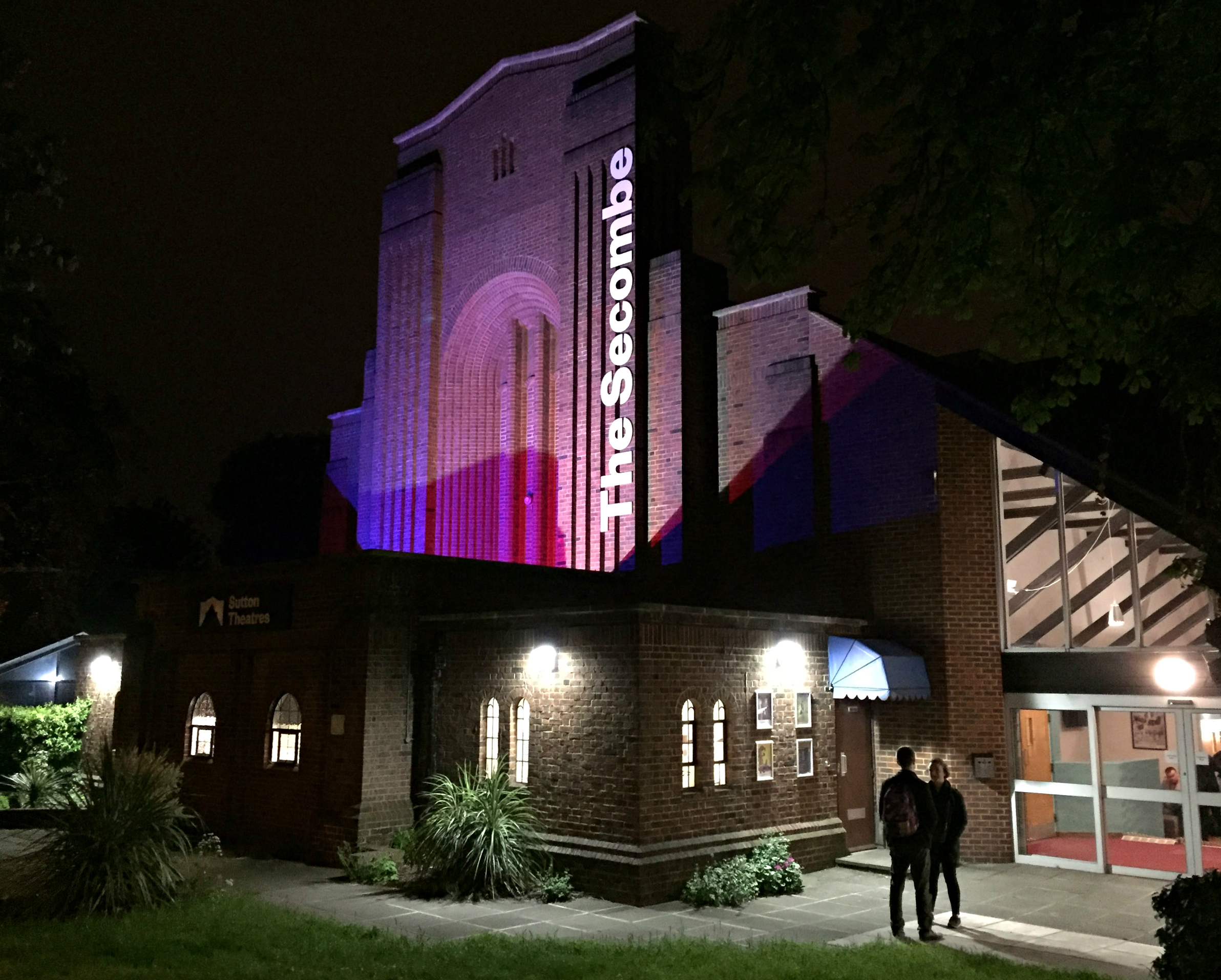
Secombe Theatre, Sutton

The Secombe Theatre (named after Sir Harry Secombe) was in Cheam Road, adjacent to the Holiday Inn Hotel. The theatre was opened by Sir Harry, who lived in Sutton for over 30 years of his life. The theatre was created out of a former Christian Scientist church building originally dating from 1937. The main auditorium seats 396 (or 343 if the orchestra pit is in use), and there is a large multi-purpose function room attached. The Secombe Theatre is operated in conjunction with the Charles Cryer Studio Theatre, named after the man who led the campaign to open the Secombe Theatre. (The Charles Cryer Theatre is in a converted hall in nearby Carshalton – see entry above). Productions at the Secombe have ranged in content from modern productions to new twists on older, more established plays. Some productions have been produced locally, while others have come as part of touring groups. From time to time comedians and musicians have appeared at the theatre.

In 2014, because of local council budget cuts, the venue was, along with its sister theatre, the Charles Cryer Theatre in Carshalton, identified by the Theatre Trust as one of 33 theatres in the country for inclusion on its "At Risk" register. The risk of closure spurred celebrity intervention in favour of the two theatres: writer, actor, comedian and BBC presenter Tim Vine, called on Sutton Council to reconsider its proposals. On 10 November 2014 the local council announced that four organisations submitting outline bids to take over the two theatres had been invited to submit full business cases by 12 December. The council worked with the Theatres Trust and Sutton Centre for Voluntary Services to help bidders through the bidding process. On 15 January 2015 the bid by the new "Sutton Theatres Trust" (STT) was given approval by the council's environment and neighbourhood committee to take over the theatres, thus saving them from closure. In August 2016 the Trust went into administration and the theatre closed permanently.

=== Carew Manor, Beddington ===
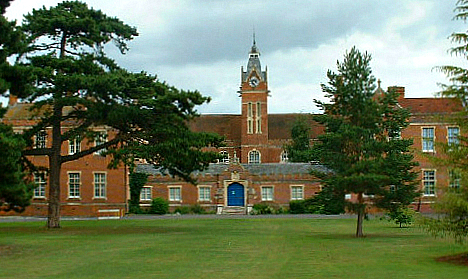
Carew Manor, Beddington Park

Beddington Park is the location of Carew Manor which was the home of the Beddington branch of the Carew family. The Grade I listed great hall, with its hammerbeam roof, survives from the Tudor house along with part of the early 18th-century orangery built around the orange trees planted by Sir Francis Carew in the 16th century and claimed to be the first in England. In the grounds is an early 18th-century Grade II* listed dovecote. Archaeologists discovered a Tudor garden including a grotto at Carew Manor, believed to have been created by Sir Francis Carew in the 16th century. There are tours of the great hall organised by the London Borough of Sutton Museum & Heritage Service.

=== Church of St Mary the Virgin, Beddington, Sutton ===
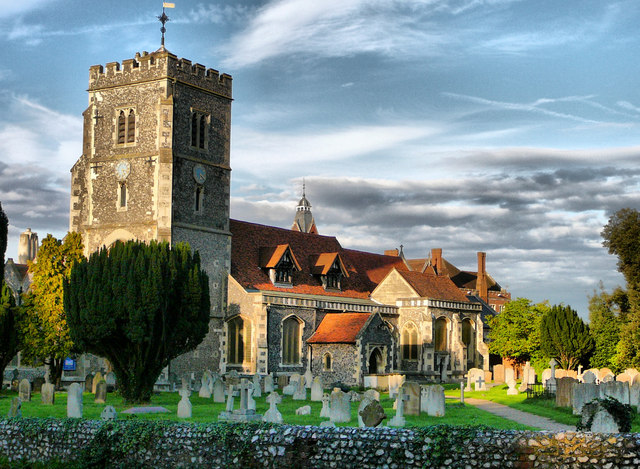
St Mary's Church, Beddington

The Grade II* listed 14th-century flint parish church of St Mary's occupies a prominent position in Beddington Park, immediately south of what is now Carew Manor School and which was from the late Middle Ages the seat of the Carew family. It contains an organ screen by William Morris. The church is designated at Grade II for the following principal reasons:

- It has substantial amounts of fabric from the 14th and 15th centuries
- It was extensively restored and provided with an extremely elaborate and interesting mid-Victorian decorative scheme.
- It has monuments and other fixtures of importance from c. 1200 to the 20th century, including font and Carew tombs.
- The Morris and Co. organ is of special note, and the Last Judgment reredos is unusual.

=== River Wandle ===
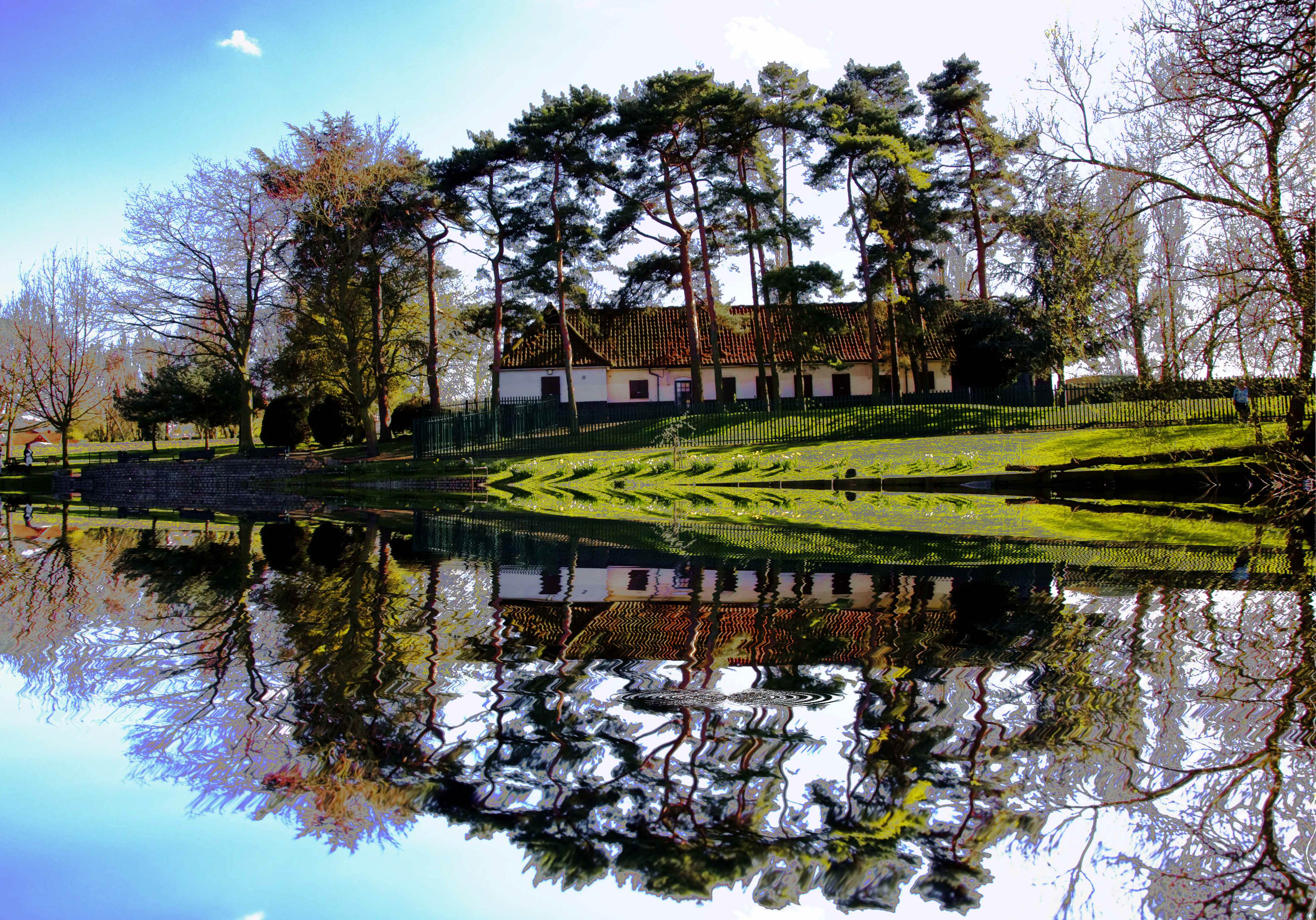
The River Wandle in Beddington Park

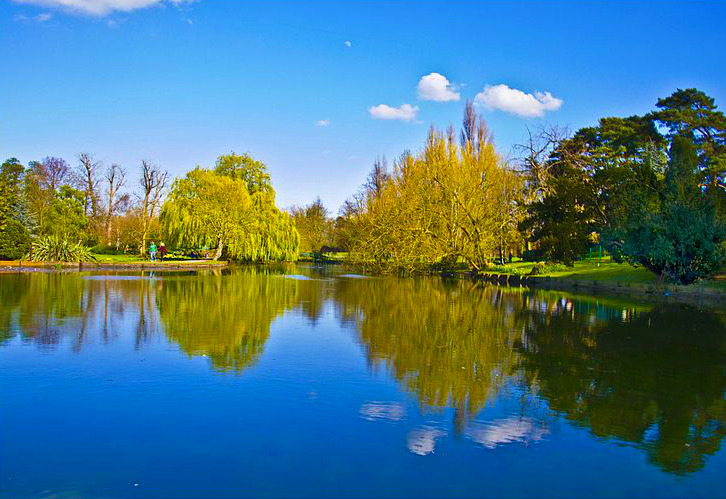
Beddington Park

The River Wandle is a 9 miles (14 km) long river which flows through four southwest London boroughs, including Sutton. It passes through Croydon, Sutton, Merton, and Wandsworth where it joins the River Thames. The river changed from being a mainly rural one lined with a scattering of watermills at the beginning of the 19th century to a heavily built-up one by the 1930s. In the second half of the 20th century the river changed again, as the local authorities made improvements to its visual appearance and restored it as a habitat for wildlife. Much of the River is accessible using the Wandle Trail, which passes through Sutton borough at Beddington, Hackbridge and Carshalton (including Grove Park in Carshalton Village).

=== Little Holland House, Carshalton ===
Little Holland House in Carshalton Beeches was the home of the artist Frank Dickinson (1874–1961). Dickinson's Arts and Crafts style interior was influenced by John Ruskin and textile designer and artist William Morris. The house contains many of his art works. Admission is free and the house is open 1.30–5.30pm the first Sunday of each month plus Bank Holiday Sundays and Mondays.

=== Sutton Library, Sutton town centre ===
Sutton Library is situated close to the top of the town, near St Nicholas Church and the Holiday Inn Hotel, and is part of a complex which contains the Civic Offices, home of Sutton Borough Council, and the Sutton College of Liberal Arts. It is the largest library in the borough. Originally opened in 1975, it was extensively refurbished in 2004 to meet changing customer needs. It was the first public library to appoint a library writer-in-residence; the first to establish a CD and video lending library; and the first to offer a full public library service on Sundays. The library is arranged over four storeys, and the lending and reference facilities extend to a reader's lounge; café and shop; IT facilities; opportunities to listen to music; and a children's library themed around the world's environments.

=== Sutton Life Centre, Sutton ===
The Sutton Life Centre is an £8 million community facility designed to improve life chances for younger people and encourage good citizenship. Its key feature – the lifezone – is a virtual street, a room with screens on all walls showing real-life scenes from Sutton's streets. It also has a library, a café, a climbing wall, and community, eco, sports, youth and media zones. It tries to encourage community engagement and involvement. It was opened on 27 October 2010 by Deputy Prime Minister Nick Clegg.

=== Honeywood Museum, Carshalton ===
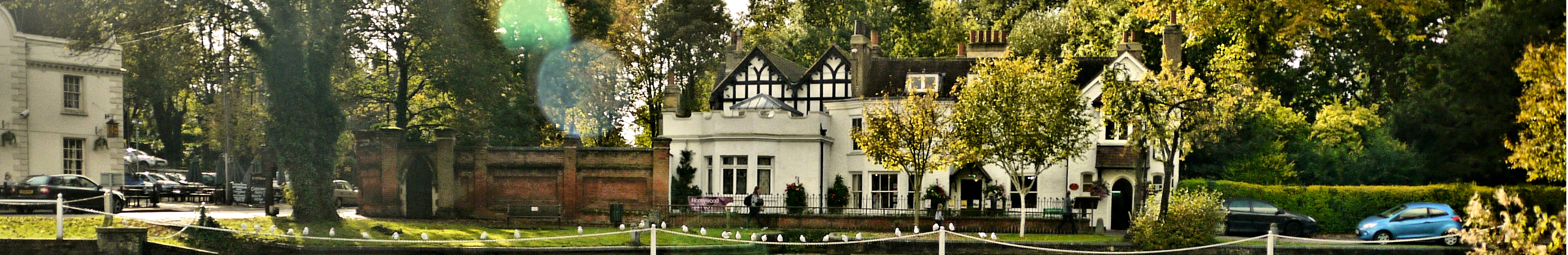
Panoramic view including the Greyhound Hotel (left) and Honeywood House Museum (centre)

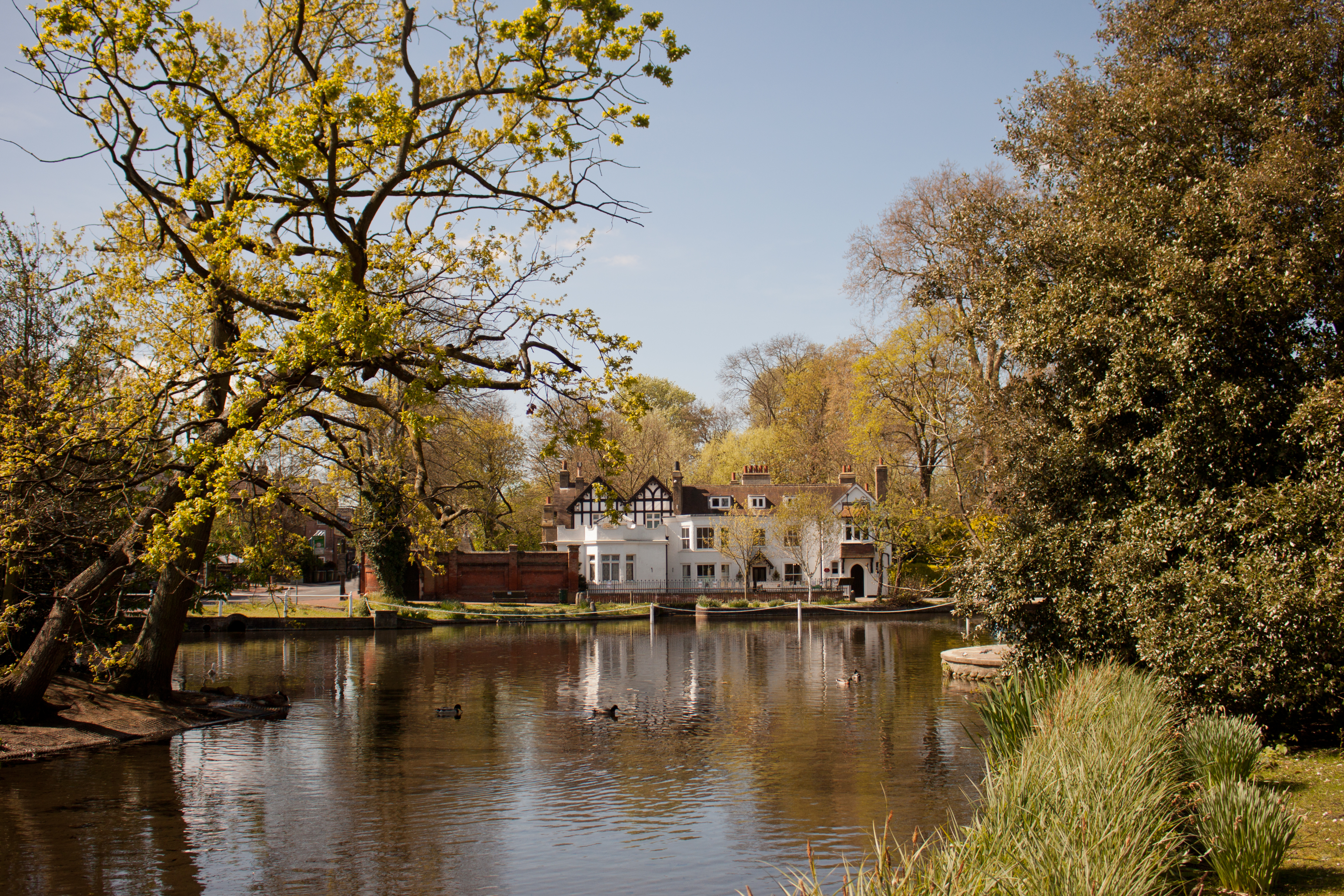
Honeywood House from a distance

Honeywood is a large house at the western end of Carshalton Ponds. At its earliest it dates from the 17th century but has been much extended and restored, particularly in the period 1896 to 1903 when a large Edwardian wing was added to the south side. It now houses the London Borough of Sutton's main Museum and has a local history collection, including objects that date back to the Bronze Age. The museum has recently been refurbished, reopening in May 2012 with enhanced features. Among others improvements, there are now expanded displays about the river Wandle and its influence on the life of the area, including an interactive map.

=== Arts Network Sutton ===
Arts Network Sutton "promotes, champions, nurtures and acts as a voice for the arts" in the borough. Taking over from the former Sutton Arts Council, it was put in place in April 2014, and launched by the Mayor of Sutton in June. It co-ordinates the arts locally and works together with regional and national arts bodies, informs the local arts community about arts initiatives, seeks out funding for local projects and runs events.

=== Public art in Sutton town centre ===
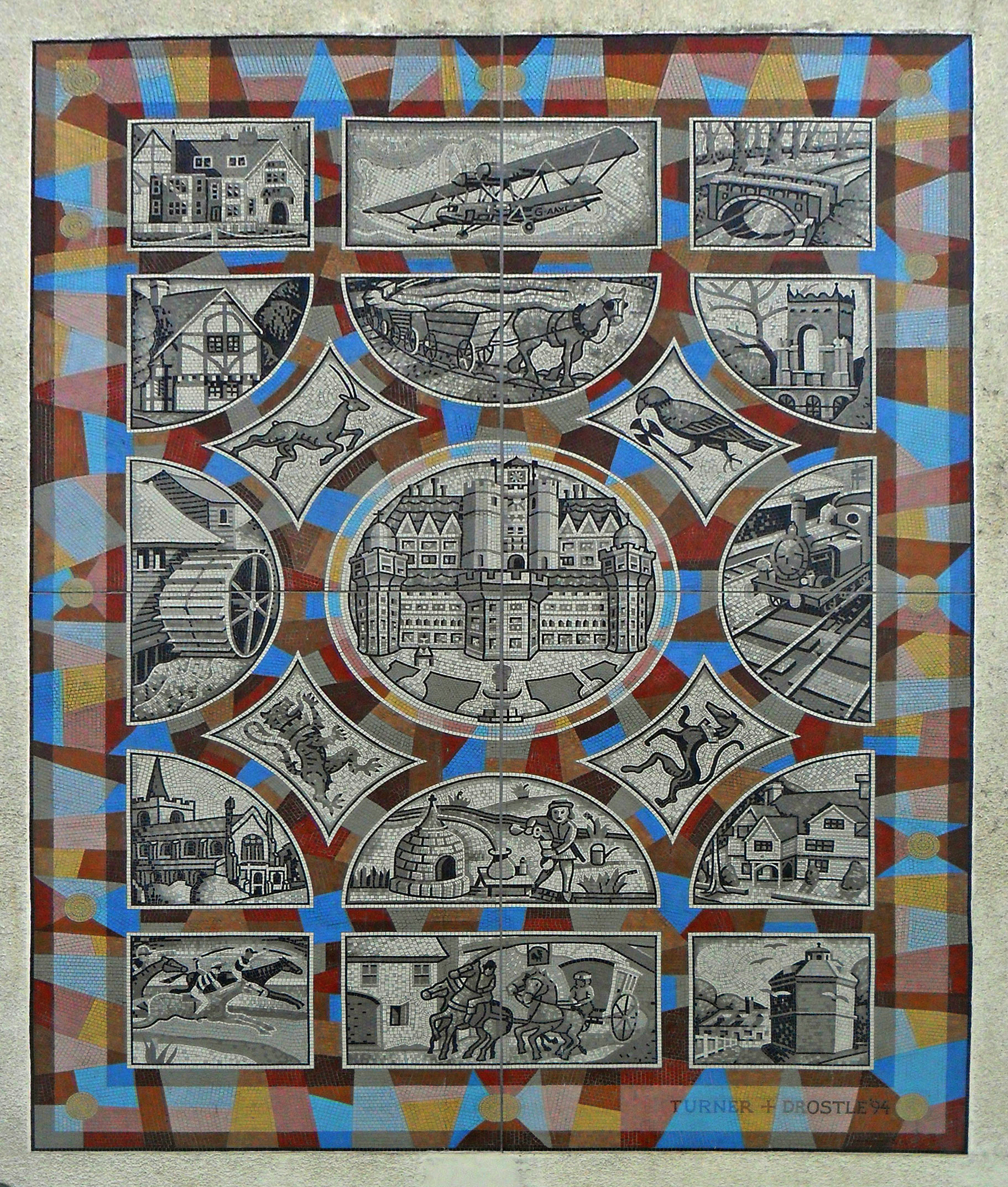
Sutton Heritage Mural

There are a number of examples of public art in Sutton town centre, ranging from building-height murals, to sculptures to an armillary. These are all fully described in the article on the town of Sutton itself. Of particular borough-wide note is one of the murals, which is in the form of a mosaic measuring 9 metres (30 feet) in height and 5 metres (16 feet)approximately) in width, and covering the whole of a three-storey wall in the town square near the Waterstones bookshop. It was made from vitreous ceramic tesserae (small tiles made of glass and clay), and put in place in 1994. It was commissioned to celebrate Sutton's heritage, and shows several aspects of the borough's heritage and local history in a geometric pattern of nineteen panels. The centre-piece is the depiction of Henry VIII's palace at Nonsuch. Other panels depict armorial bearers from the old local families, as well as industrial and architectural heritage.

=== Whitehall Gallery, Cheam ===
Whitehall is a timber framed and weatherboarded house in the centre of Cheam village. It was originally built in about 1500 as a wattle and daub yeoman farmer's house but has been much extended. The external weatherboarded appearance dates from the 18th century. In the garden there is a medieval well which served an earlier building on the site. Now an historic house museum, the building features a period kitchen, and house details from the Georgian, Victorian and Edwardian eras. The museum temporarily closed in 2016 to allow for a £1.6m refurbishment of the building. It reopened in 2018 with improved facilities. Jill Whitehead, chair of the council's environment and neighbourhood committee, said: "The redevelopment of the Whitehall Museum is of major significance to the borough as it is one of our oldest and most historic buildings."

== Listed buildings ==
Within the London Borough of Sutton there are 147 Grade II listed buildings, six Grade II* listings, one Grade I listing, 4 'B' listings and 6 'C' listings.

== Demographics ==
Population pyramid of Sutton in 2021

Ethnic makeup of Sutton by single year ages in 2021

The proportion of Black, Asian and ethnic minorities in general living in the borough has almost doubled each decade since 1991: in 2019 Council data put the non white population at 26.8%, and the total White population at 73.2%. White British is the largest ethnic group at 62.6; this is down 10% from the 2011 census. The Filipino community is the largest foreign-born population in Sutton, closely followed by the Sri-Lankan (Tamil) community.

=== Ethnicity ===
Ethnic Group	Year											
Ethnic Group	1971 estimations		1981 estimates		1991 census		2001 census		2011 census		2021 census	
Ethnic Group	Number	%	Number	%	Number	%	Number	%	Number	%	Number	%
White: Total	–	98.4%	159,123	96.2%	158,902	94.1%	160,351	89.2%	149,449	78.6%	143,145	68.3%
White: British	–	–	–	–	–	–	150,515	83.7%	134,854	70.9%	120,014	57.2%
White: Irish	–	–	–	–	–	–	3,664	2%	3,219	1.7%	3,118	1.5%
White: Gypsy or Irish Traveller	–	–	–	–	–	–	–	–	193	0.1%	130	0.1%
White: Roma	–	–	–	–	–	–	–	–	–	–	321	0.2%
White: Other	–	–	–	–	–	–	6,172	3.4%	11,183	5.9%	19,562	9.3%
Black or Black British: Total	–	–	–	–	2,321	1.37%	4,601	2.5%	9,120	4.8%	12,465	5.9%
Black or Black British: African	–	–	–	–	621	0.4%	2,208	1.2%	5,471	2.9%	7,441	3.5%
Black or Black British: Caribbean	–	–	–	–	1,179	0.7%	2,054	1.1%	2,742	1.4%	3,450	1.6%
Black or Black British: Other Black	–	–	–	–	521	0.3%	339	0.2%	907	0.5%	1,574	0.8%
Asian or Asian British: Total	–	–	–	–	6,138	3.6%	9,711	5.4%	22,035	11.6%	36,787	17.4%
Asian or Asian British: Indian	–	–	–	–	2,732	1.6%	4,133	2.3%	6,454	3.4%	12,618	6.0%
Asian or Asian British: Pakistani	–	–	–	–	504	0.3%	1,216	0.7%	2,595	1.4%	6,177	2.9%
Asian or Asian British: Bangladeshi	–	–	–	–	375	0.2%	578	0.3%	1,183	0.6%	1,778	0.8%
Asian or Asian British: Chinese	–	–	–	–	762	0.5%	1,211	0.7%	2,240	1.2%	3,989	1.9%
Asian or Asian British: Other Asian	–	–	–	–	1,765	1.0%	2,573	1.4%	9,563	5.0%	12,225	5.8%
Mixed or British Mixed: Total	–	–	–	–	–	–	3,725	2.1%	7,134	3.7%	10,162	4.9%
Mixed: White and Black Caribbean	–	–	–	–	–	–	1,205	0.7%	2,298	1.2%	2,777	1.3%
Mixed: White and Black African	–	–	–	–	–	–	358	0.2%	838	0.4%	1,268	0.6%
Mixed: White and Asian	–	–	–	–	–	–	1,274	0.7%	2,286	1.2%	3,068	1.5%
Mixed: Other Mixed	–	–	–	–	–	–	888	0.5%	1,712	0.9%	3,049	1.5%
Other: Total	–	–	–	–	1519	0.9%	1,380	0.8%	2,408	1.3%	7,077	3.4%
Other: Arab	–	–	–	–	–	–	–	–	976	0.5%	1,392	0.7%
Other: Any other ethnic group	–	–	–	–	1519	0.9%	1,380	0.8%	1,432	0.8%	5,685	2.7%
Ethnic minority: Total	–	1.6%	6,289	3.8%	9,978	5.9%	19,417	10.8%	40,697	21.4%	66,491	31.7%
Total	–	100%	165,412	100%	168,880	100%	179,768	100%	190,146	100%	209,636	100%

=== Religion ===
This table includes Sutton religions for 2021 census:

Religion	2021	
Religion	Number	%
Christian	95,960	45,77%
Muslim	14,736	7,03%
Hindu	14,666	7%
Buddhist	1,822	0,87%
Sikh	447	0,21%
Jewish	407	0,19%
Other religion	1,244	0,59%
No religion	67,769	32,33%
Religion not stated	12,589	6,01%
Total	209,640	100%

=== Immigration ===
This list includes top-15 sources of immigration to Borough of Sutton for 2021 census:

#	Country	Number
1	India	6,891
2	Sri Lanka	4,622
3	Poland	3,407
4	Pakistan	3,109
5	Bulgaria	2,231
6	Ireland	1,925
7	Romania	1,890
8	South Africa	1,645
9	China	1,412
10	Philippines	1,385
11	Italy	1,212
12	Ghana	1,212
13	Nigeria	1,144
14	Portugal	976
15	Germany	969

Population census
Year	Pop.	±%
1801	3,838	—
1811	4,220	+10.0%
1821	4,856	+15.1%
1831	5,514	+13.6%
1841	6,169	+11.9%
1851	6,425	+4.1%
1861	11,807	+83.8%
1871	17,190	+45.6%
1881	22,573	+31.3%
1891	27,883	+23.5%
1901	39,454	+41.5%
1911	55,828	+41.5%
1921	75,509	+35.3%
1931	102,132	+35.3%
1941	134,002	+31.2%
1951	175,821	+31.2%
1961	172,817	−1.7%
1971	169,879	−1.7%
1981	167,566	−1.4%
1991	171,373	+2.3%
2001	179,667	+4.8%
2011	190,146	+5.8%
2021	209,602	+10.2%
2024 estimate	214,525	+2.3%
Note: 2024 estimate

== Big Society ==
The London Borough of Sutton was one of the four "vanguard areas" selected in 2010 for the Government's Big Society initiative. Sutton was chosen because of its reputation for having a strong sense of community, its active voluntary sector and track record of devolving power to its neighbourhoods.

== Education ==
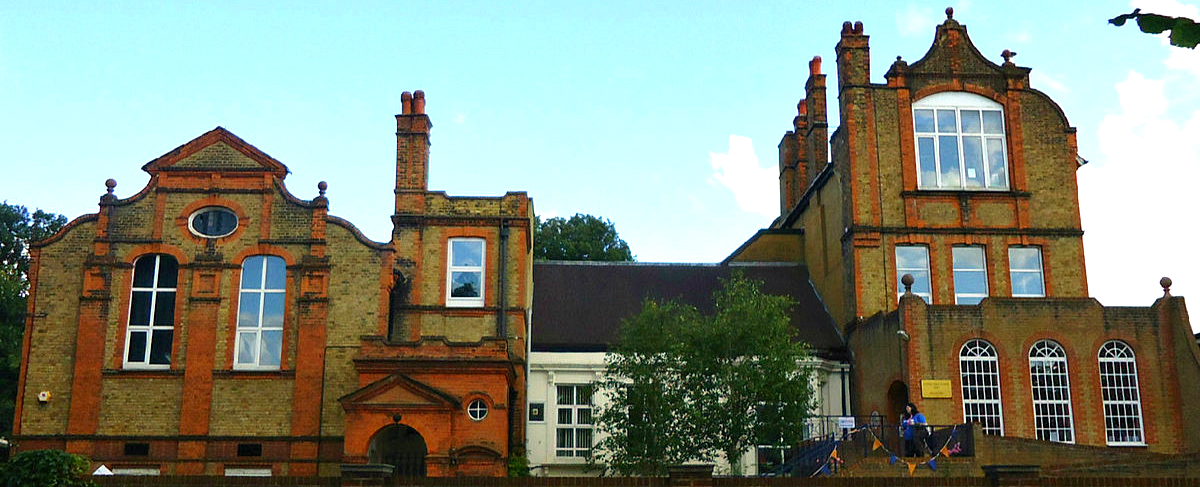
Sutton High School for Girls

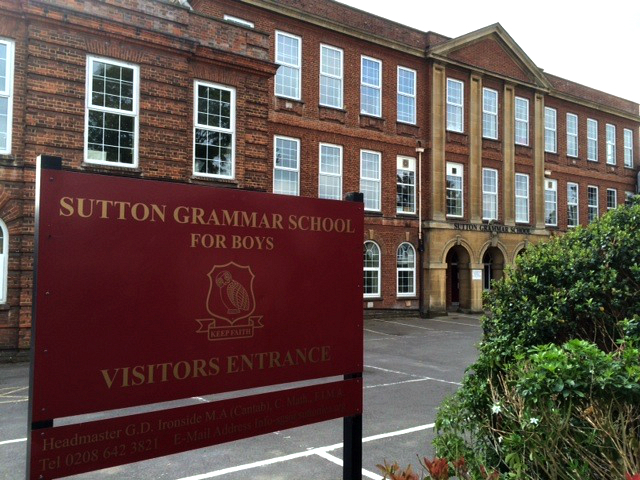
Sutton Grammar School for Boys

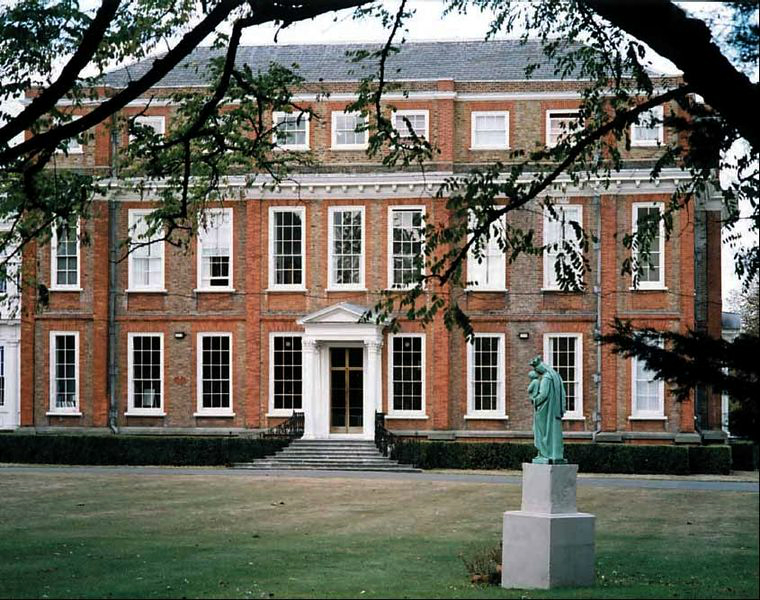
Saint Philomena's School

=== Schools ===
The London Borough of Sutton has some schools at both primary and secondary levels which perform exceptionally well. Five of the state secondary schools are grammar schools.

- The Borough came top of the England GCSE league tables in 2011 on the key benchmark – the percentage of pupils achieving five good GCSEs (A* to C) including English and Mathematics. The national average for 2011 was 58.2%. The average for Sutton, at 74.7%, was more than 15% above this national average. Only three other local authorities achieved an average above 70%.
- In 2013 Sutton's secondary schools bucked the national trend and performed better than in 2012. 83.9% of pupils achieved five A* to C GCSE grades in subjects including Maths and English compared with 75.6% in 2012. Sutton's GCSE performance was second across all borough's in England (The Royal Borough of Kensington and Chelsea was first).
- Sutton's primary schools were described as 'particularly impressive' by Ofsted in its December 2013 annual schools report 2012–2013. It ranked Sutton's primary schools at joint third in the country and joint first in London.
- In July 2016 it was announced that two schools in the borough had been named the best schools in the country in the Times Educational Supplement (TES) 2016 Awards. Stanley Park High School was named the "Best Secondary School" in the country. Limes College was named the best alternative provision school. TES described Stanley Park as having achieved "remarkable outcomes for its student body by focusing on igniting their passion for learning." The judges were "impressed by the creative, ambitious and supportive culture fostered at Stanley Park". Limes College was recognised as a place where young people are able to make a fresh start and build for the future, and where staff truly believe that every student can excel.

Schools in the borough were set to receive the fourth largest funding increase in the country in 2015/16.

In May 2014 it was announced that grammar schools in the borough planned to set aside a number of additional places specifically for Sutton borough pupils. Nonsuch High School for Girls and Sutton Grammar School for Boys had already agreed this new policy at the time of the announcement, while the other three grammar schools in the borough were set to follow suit.

=== Adult education ===
Sutton College of Learning for Adults (SCOLA), originally named Sutton College of Liberal Arts, is a college offering over 1,000 part-time courses at its borough-wide centres. its main centres are in Sutton and Wallington.

== Environment ==
The London Borough of Sutton is home to a number of notable environmental projects, including the following.

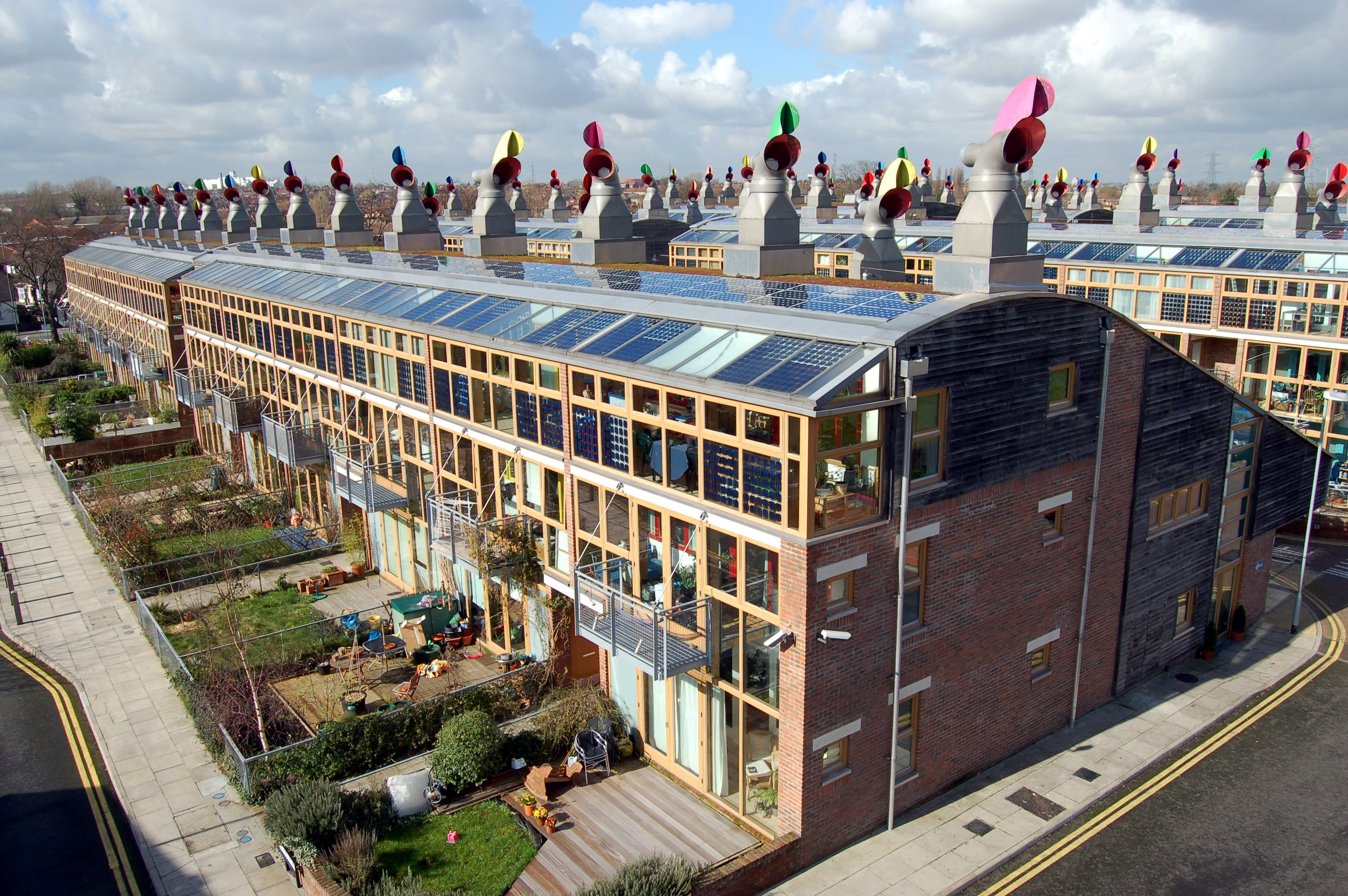
BedZED general view

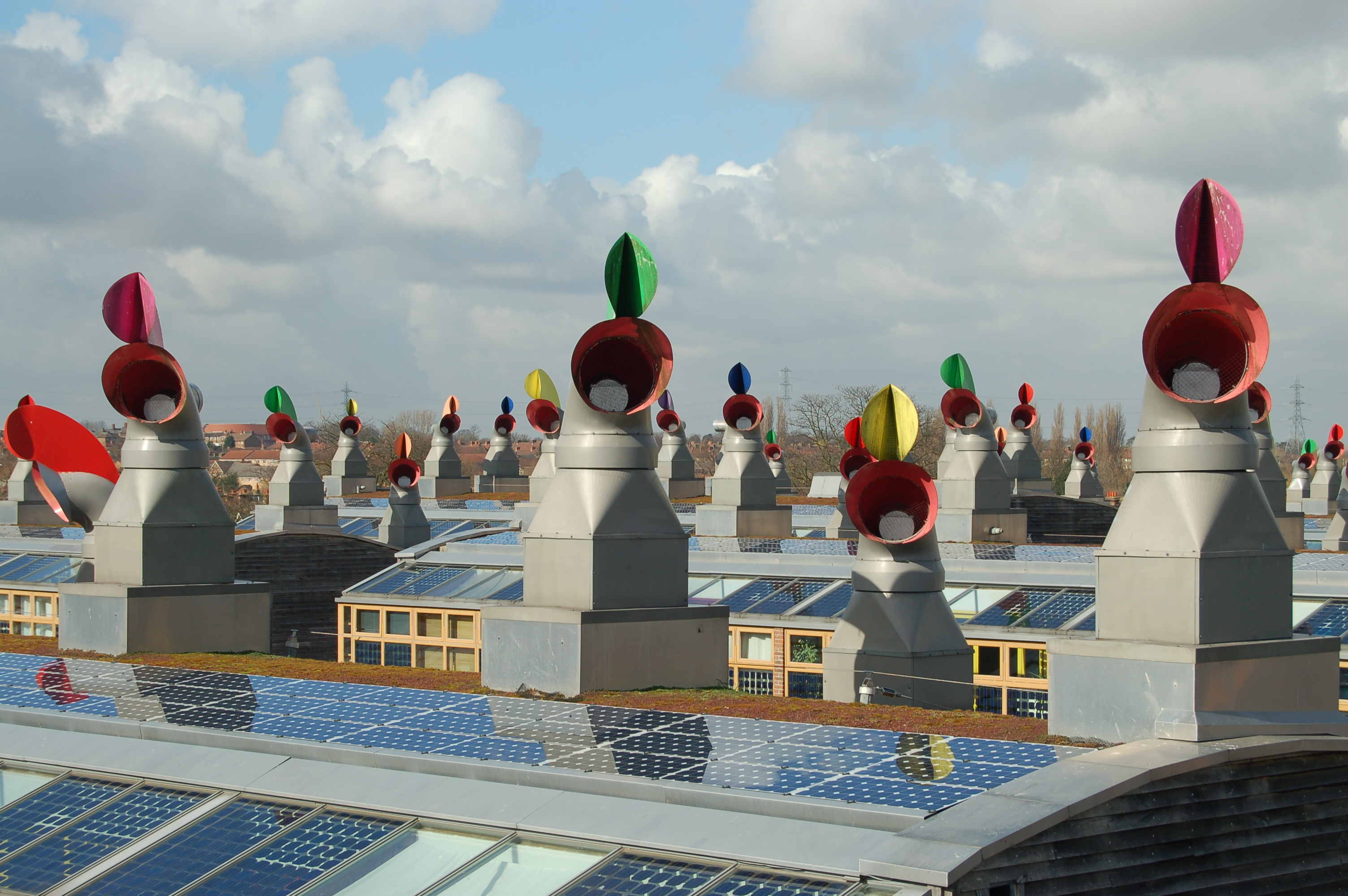
BedZED roofs

BedZED (Beddington Zero Energy Development)

The acclaimed BedZED (Beddington Zero Energy Development) housing complex is located on London Road, SM6, about 500 yards north of Hackbridge mainline railway station. It uses a number of innovative technologies to enable it to operate with zero energy use. It was designed by the architect Bill Dunster to support a more sustainable lifestyle. The project was led by the Peabody Trust in partnership with Bill Dunster Architects, Ellis & Moore Consulting Engineers, BioRegional, Arup and the cost consultants Gardiner and Theobald.

The 99 homes, and 1,405 square metres of work space were built between 2000 and 2002. It is the UK's largest and first carbon-neutral eco-community. The buildings are constructed of materials that store heat during warm conditions and release heat at cooler times, and where possible, they have been built from natural, recycled or reclaimed materials. The first residents moved in (to the Helios Road part of the development) during March 2002.

BedZED receives power from a small-scale combined heat and power plant (CHP). In conventional energy generation, the heat that is produced as a by-product of generating electricity is lost. With CHP technology, this heat can be harnessed and put to use. At BedZED, the heat from the CHP provides hot water, which is distributed around the site via a district heating system of super-insulated pipes. Should residents or workers require a heating boost, each home or office has a domestic hot water tank that doubles as a radiator.

The CHP plant at BedZED is powered by off-cuts from tree surgery waste that would otherwise go to landfill. Wood is a carbon neutral fuel because the CO_{2} released when the wood is burned is equal to that absorbed by the tree as it grew.

The development has attracted wide interest and acclaim over the past decade since it was built, and, has won numerous awards. Among other examples of recognition, it was shortlisted for the Stirling Prize for architecture in October 2003, and won awards from the London Evening Standard and RIBA in 2002.

Sutton Ecology Centre

The Sutton Ecology Centre is located in the Carshalton Village part of Sutton borough. The Grounds are a 1.3 hectare Local Nature Reserve and Site of Borough Importance for Nature Conservation, Grade 1. It is owned by Sutton Council and managed by the Council together with the Friends of Sutton Ecology Centre.

It is an area of mainly open space where visitors can find out about wildlife habitats, alternative energy, recycling, composting, and organic gardening. The centre's activities include running educational visits for schools and community groups, as well as events and volunteer days.

The history of the Ecology Centre is that the grounds were until the late eighties known as the "Lodgelands", named after the old gardens of The Lodge in Carshalton. They were used as a tree nursery until the early 1980s, when they became surplus to requirements. After a prolonged public debate, it was agreed in 1987 to preserve the area as an open space for public use.

Carshalton Environmental Fair

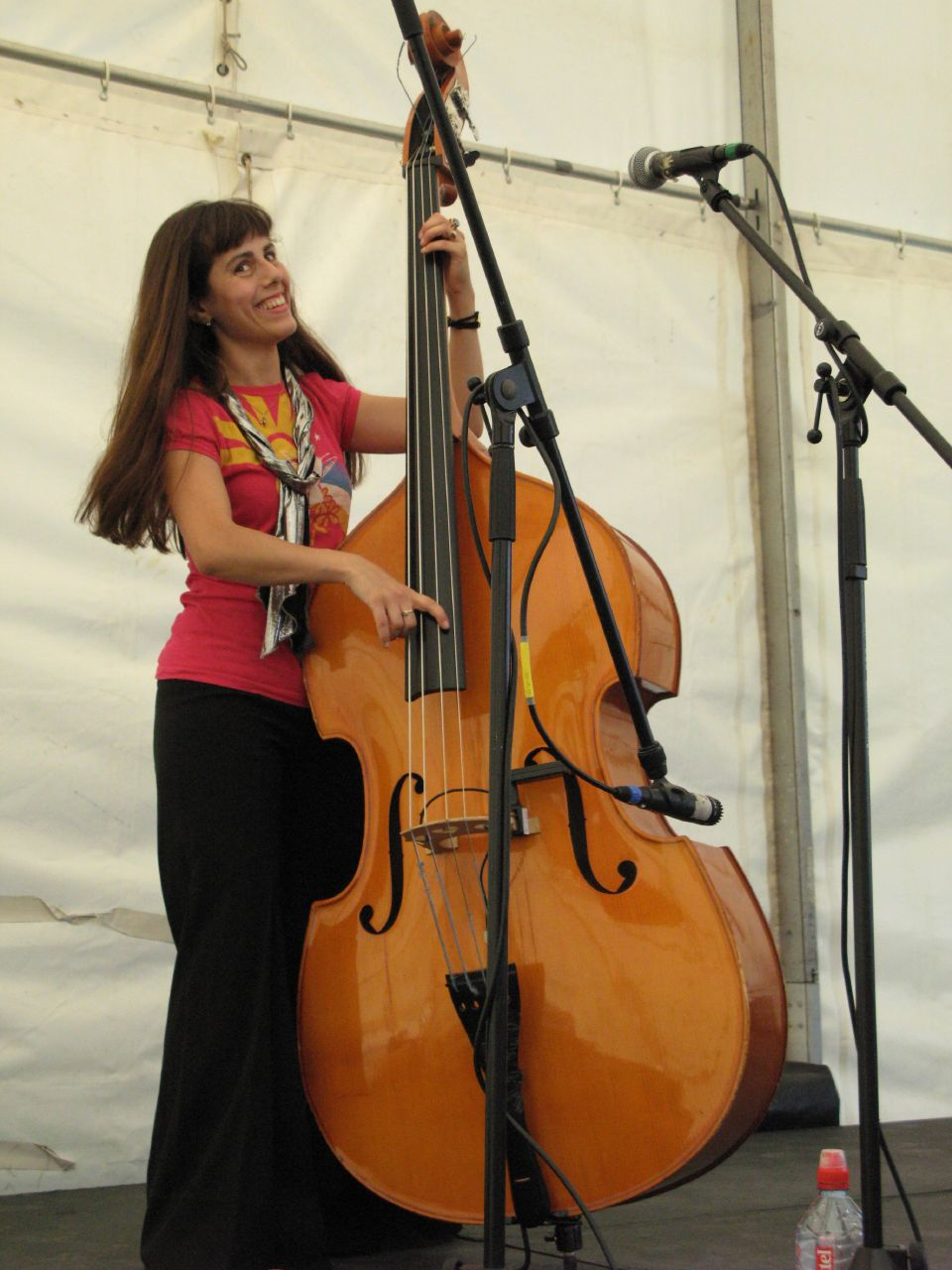
Musician performing at the Carshalton Environmental Fair

The Environmental Fair is held in Carshalton Park on August Bank Holiday Monday. It features over 100 stalls and showcases local sustainability initiatives. It also includes music, performing art, poetry, children's activities, campaign groups, local craft, interactive demonstrations, and a farmers' market. Music is performed from three stages and across the genres from rock to folk. The main stage is a natural open-air amphitheatre. There is food and a bar with real ales. The fair attracts on average around 10,000 people. It is organised by EcoLocal with a team of volunteers.

Sutton Community Farm

Sutton Community Farm, the only one of its kind in London, is located in the Wallington part of the borough. A non-profit social enterprise, it occupies a 7.5 acre small-holding of a type originally given to ex-servicemen following the First World War.

Growing the green economy

The London Borough of Sutton has provided funding to grow the green economy by creating a low carbon cluster of green businesses. The project includes the establishment of a "Green Business Network", the provision of training, and the creation of employment opportunities for assessors, surveyors, designers and installers.

Straw-bale café

The café in Manor Park, Sutton has a range of environmental features, in particular its straw-bale construction. It was built in 2010 using UK produced straw-bales and natural sustainable materials, a type of construction which means that the building could last for longer than 200 years. It was London's first energy-efficient building to use this method of construction.

== Hospitals ==
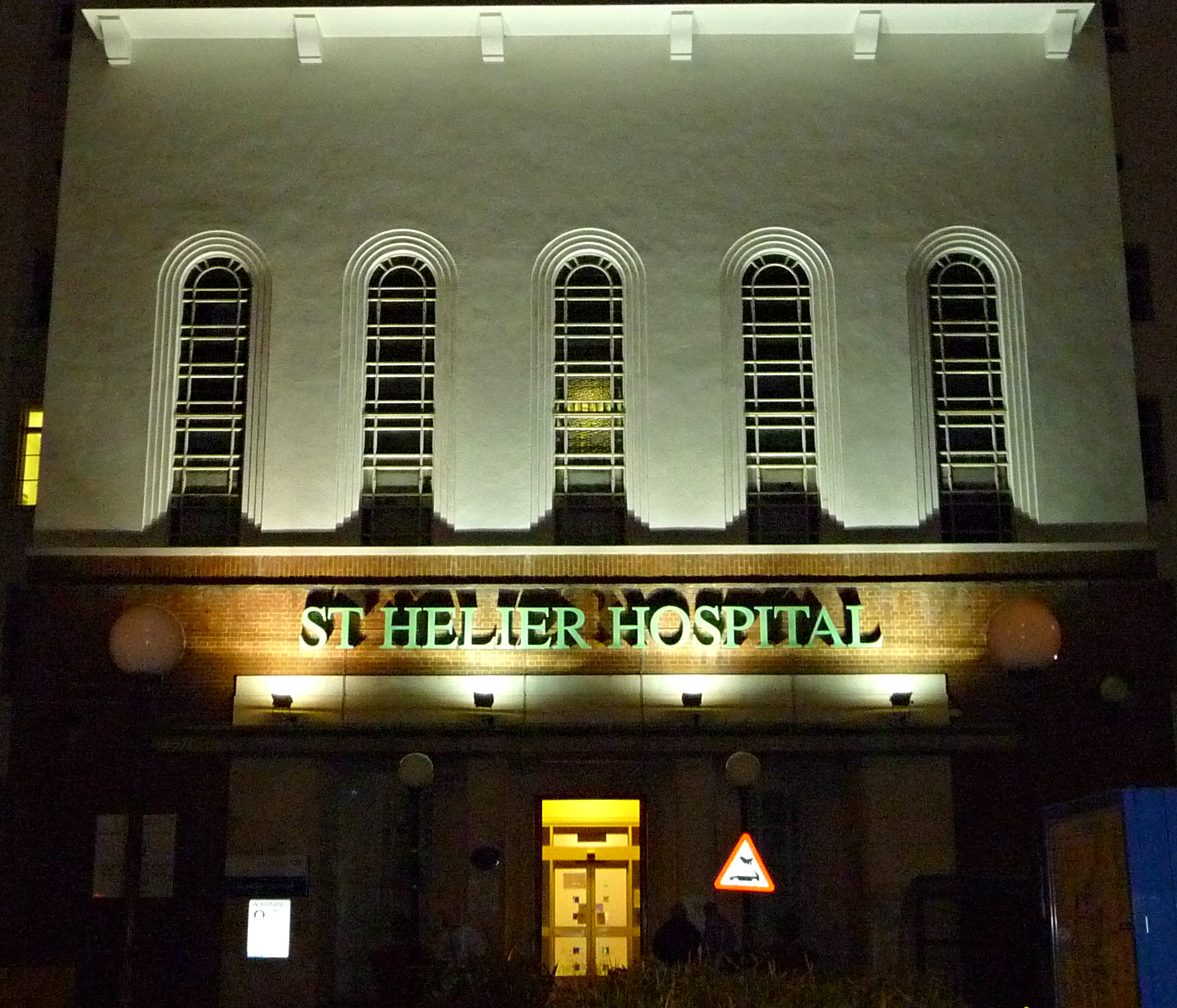
The art deco entrance of St Helier Hospital floodlit at night

St Helier Hospital and Queen Mary's Hospital for Children in the London Borough of Merton and London Borough of Sutton is run by Epsom and St Helier University Hospitals NHS Trust along with Epsom Hospital. It is located next to the large St Helier estate and close to the major intersection known as Rosehill. The hospital offers a full range of hospital services including a 24-hour accident and emergency department. The site is also home to the South West Renal and Transplantation Service and the Queen Mary's Hospital for Children, a dedicated children's hospital. St Helier Hospital is a major teaching hospital for St George's, University of London, and is the second main teaching site for the clinical years of the medicine degrees outside of St George's Hospital.

== Transport ==
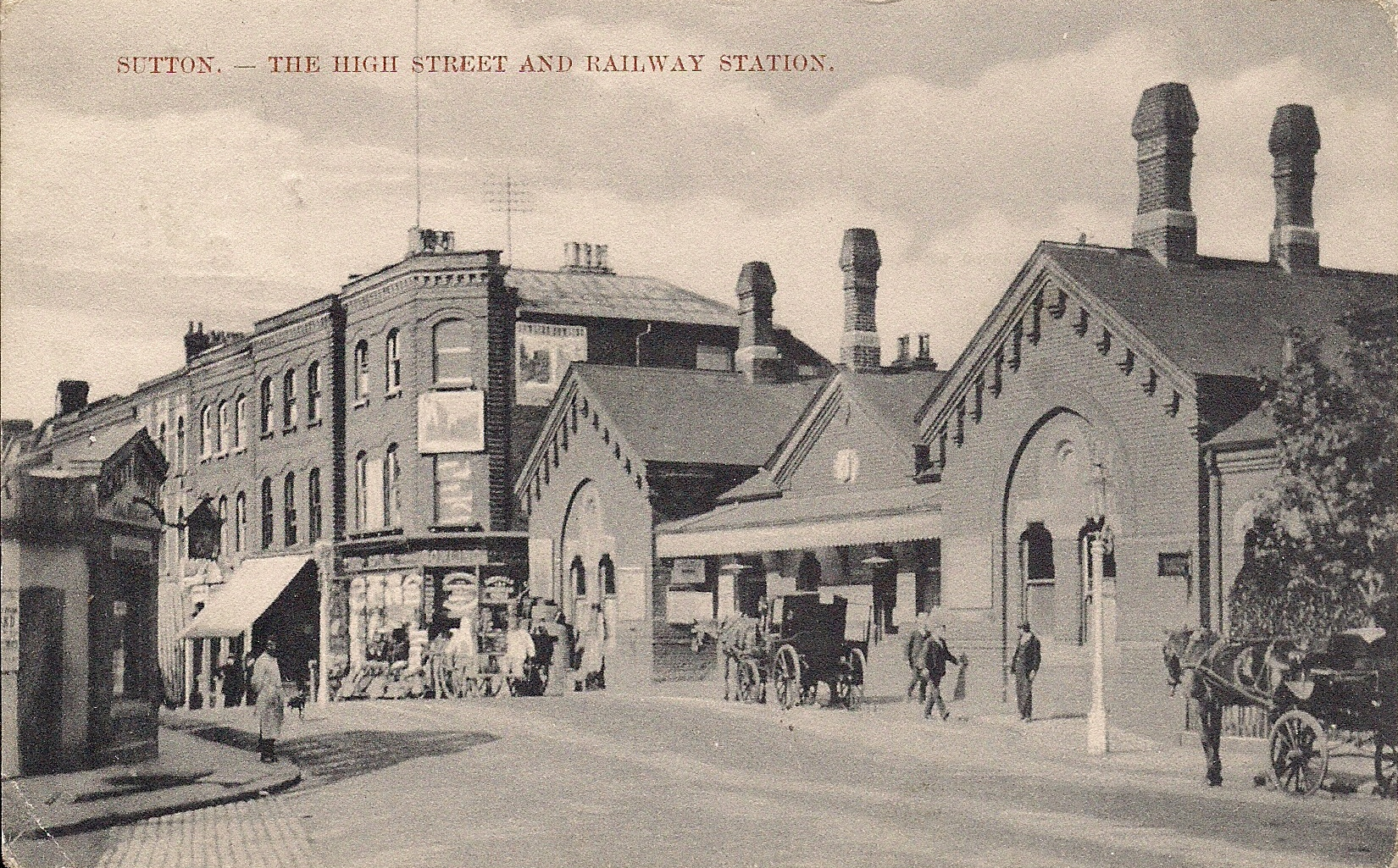
The former Sutton station c. 1905

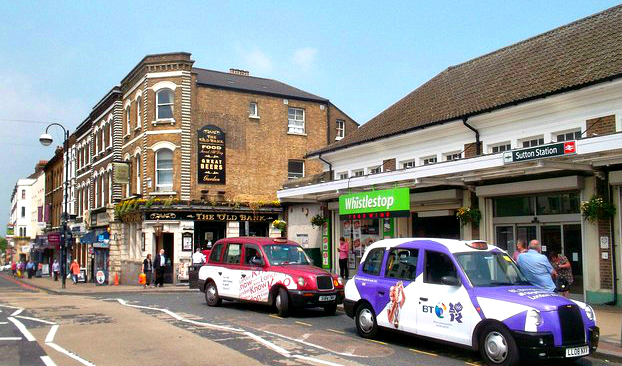
Taxis by Sutton station in 2012

=== Rail ===
Sutton has rail services to central London stations, including London Victoria, London Bridge and St Pancras International. Sutton borough has access to the London Underground with the Northern line in neighbouring Merton borough reachable by bus. The London Overground network, completed c. 2010, is 5 to 10 minutes away from Sutton at West Croydon station.

The Sutton & Mole Valley Lines railway route south from Sutton links the borough to Sussex and Surrey to the south, and to central London to the north, providing regular, direct services to stations including Clapham Junction, London Victoria, Dorking, Epsom, Horsham, Wimbledon and West Croydon. Also running through Sutton is the Sutton Loop Line which links St Albans and St Pancras International directly with the stations on the loop. The main station for all these services is Sutton railway station to the south of the town. The station is the largest and busiest in Sutton. Passenger rail services through Croydon are provided by Greater Thameslink Railway under the Southern and Thameslink brands.

=== Tram ===
The Tramlink service runs to the north of the borough and a short part of the line falls within it, including two stops: Therapia Lane and Beddington Lane. Transport for London spent several years developing plans for a Sutton Link, which would connect the service to Sutton town centre; however, in July 2020, it announced that plans had been 'paused' following financial negotiations with the Government in light of the COVID-19 pandemic.

=== Bus ===
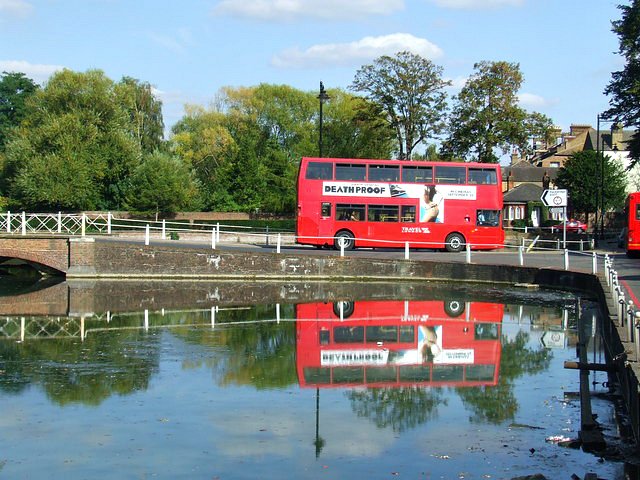
Bus by Carshalton ponds

A sizeable bus infrastructure which is part of the London Buses network operates from a main hub on the Sutton one-way system. Services are operated under contract by London General, London United, Metrobus and Transport UK London Bus. Route SL7 is the longest route in London, operating from Croydon to Heathrow Airport via Kingston.

=== Road ===
Sutton is linked into the national motorway network via the A217 and M25 orbital motorway at Junction 8. The M25 skirts the south of the borough, linking Sutton with other parts of London and the surrounding counties. The A24 passes through the northwestern part of the borough, through North Cheam and onto Epsom, Dorking, Horsham, Worthing, Bognor Regis and Chichester. This follows, in part, the course of Stane Street, an old Roman road linking London and Chichester. The A232 links Sutton with other towns in the borough, also the boroughs of Kingston, Croydon and Bromley.

=== Air ===
Sutton is located about 15 miles (24 km) from both Heathrow Airport and Gatwick Airport. Heathrow is served by London Buses route SL7 and Gatwick by the National Express Coaches A3 route, which stops outside Sutton railway station. Luton Airport, about 40 miles (64 km) to the north, is connected to Sutton by a direct train. Croydon Airport which was partly in the borough of Sutton served as London's main airport in the years prior to World War II but closed in the 1950s.

=== Cycling ===
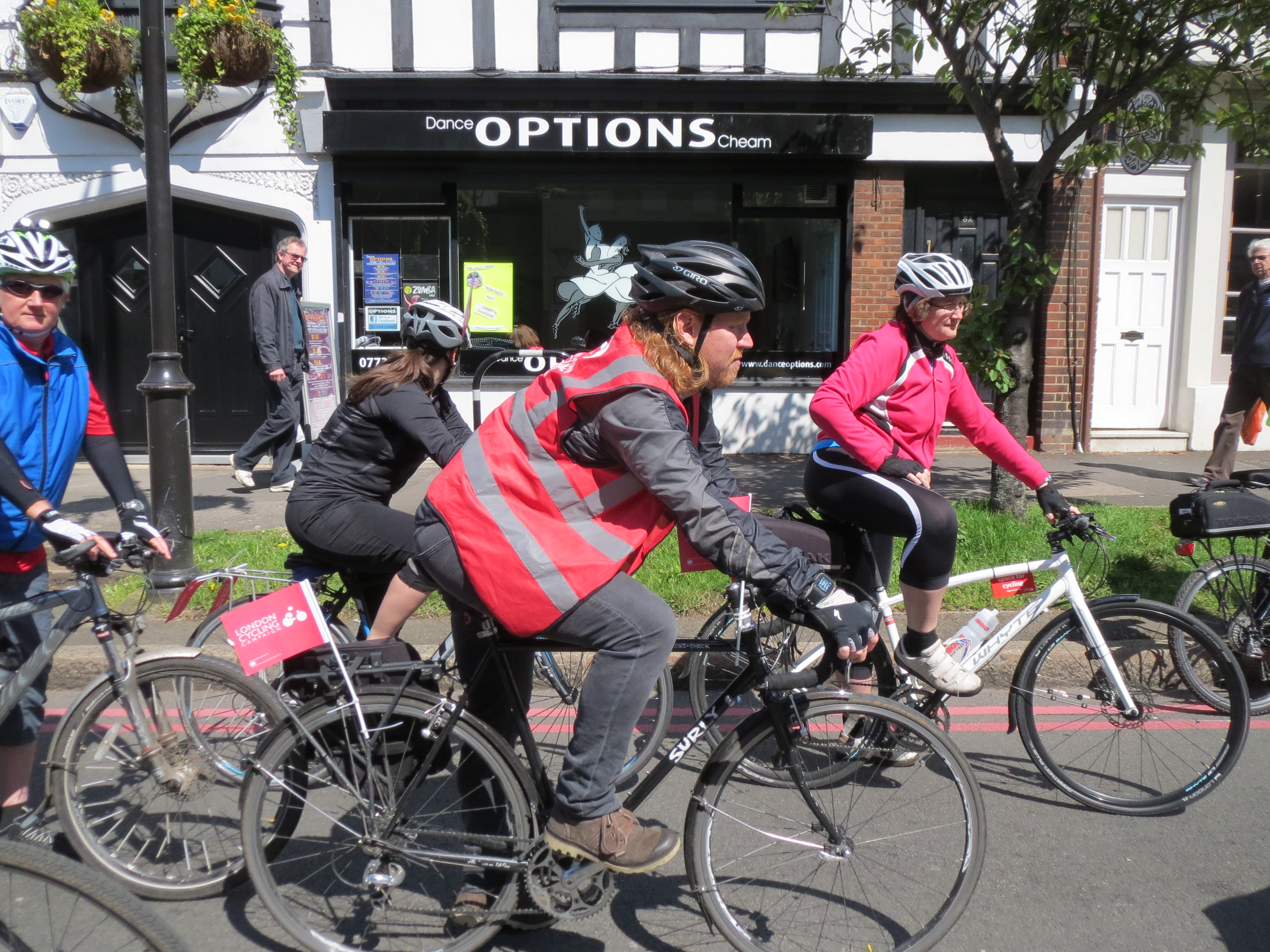
Cyclists in Cheam Village

Although hilly, Sutton is compact and has few major trunk roads running through it. It is on one of the National Cycle Network routes running around South London. The nearby North Downs to the south, part of which falls within the borough boundary, is an area of outstanding natural beauty popular with both on and off-road cyclists.

=== Travel to work ===
In March 2011, the main forms of transport that residents used to travel to work were: driving a car or van, 33.1% of all residents aged 16–74; train, 6.6%; bus, minibus or coach, 6.6%; on foot, 5.6%; underground, metro, light rail, tram, 3.9%; work mainly at or from home, 3.1%; passenger in a car or van, 2.0%; cycling 1.5%. Data from the 2011 Census states that the cycle mode share for people cycling to work had fallen from 2.1% since 2001.

== Parks and open spaces ==
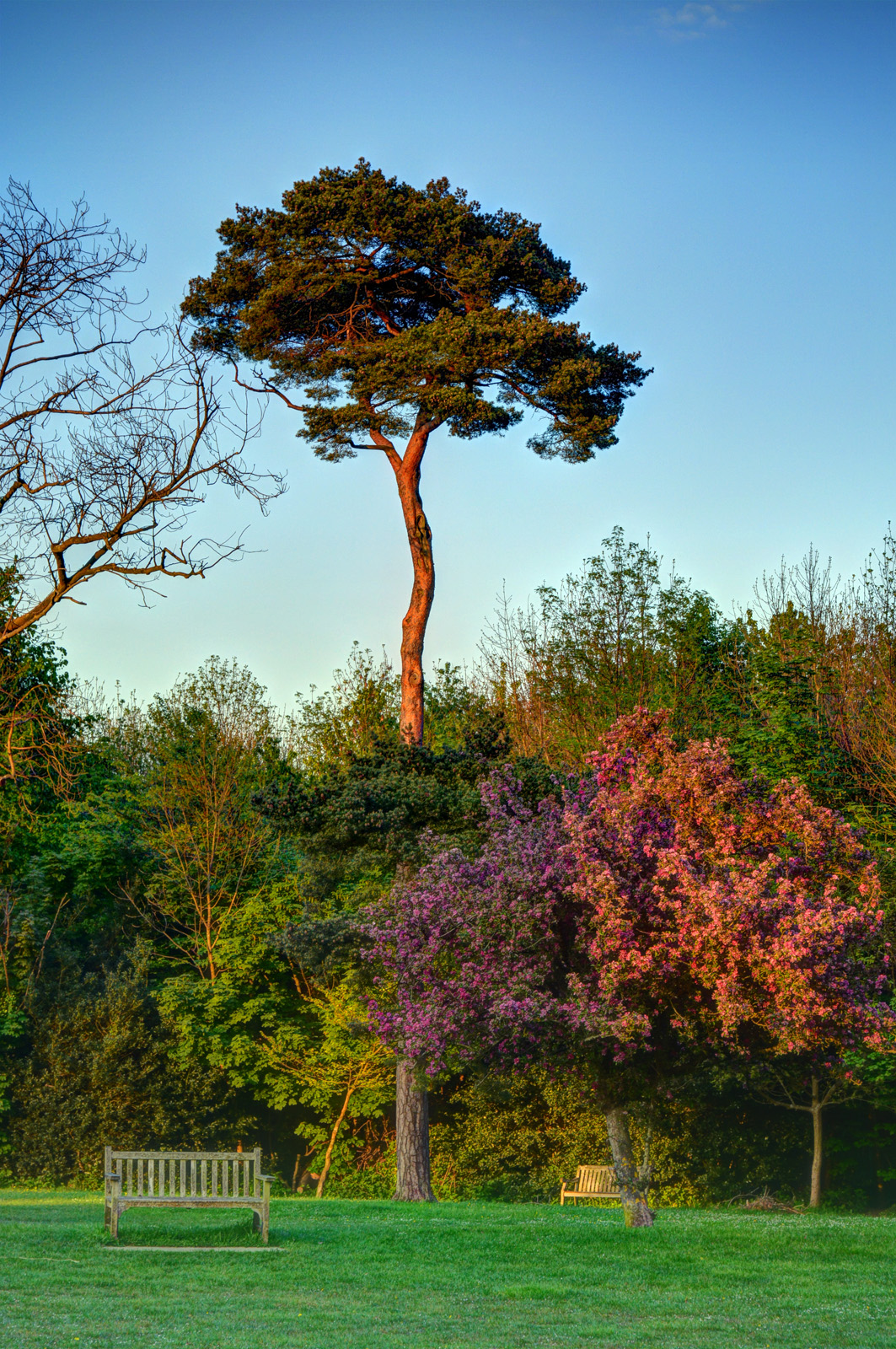
Trees in flower in Oaks Park

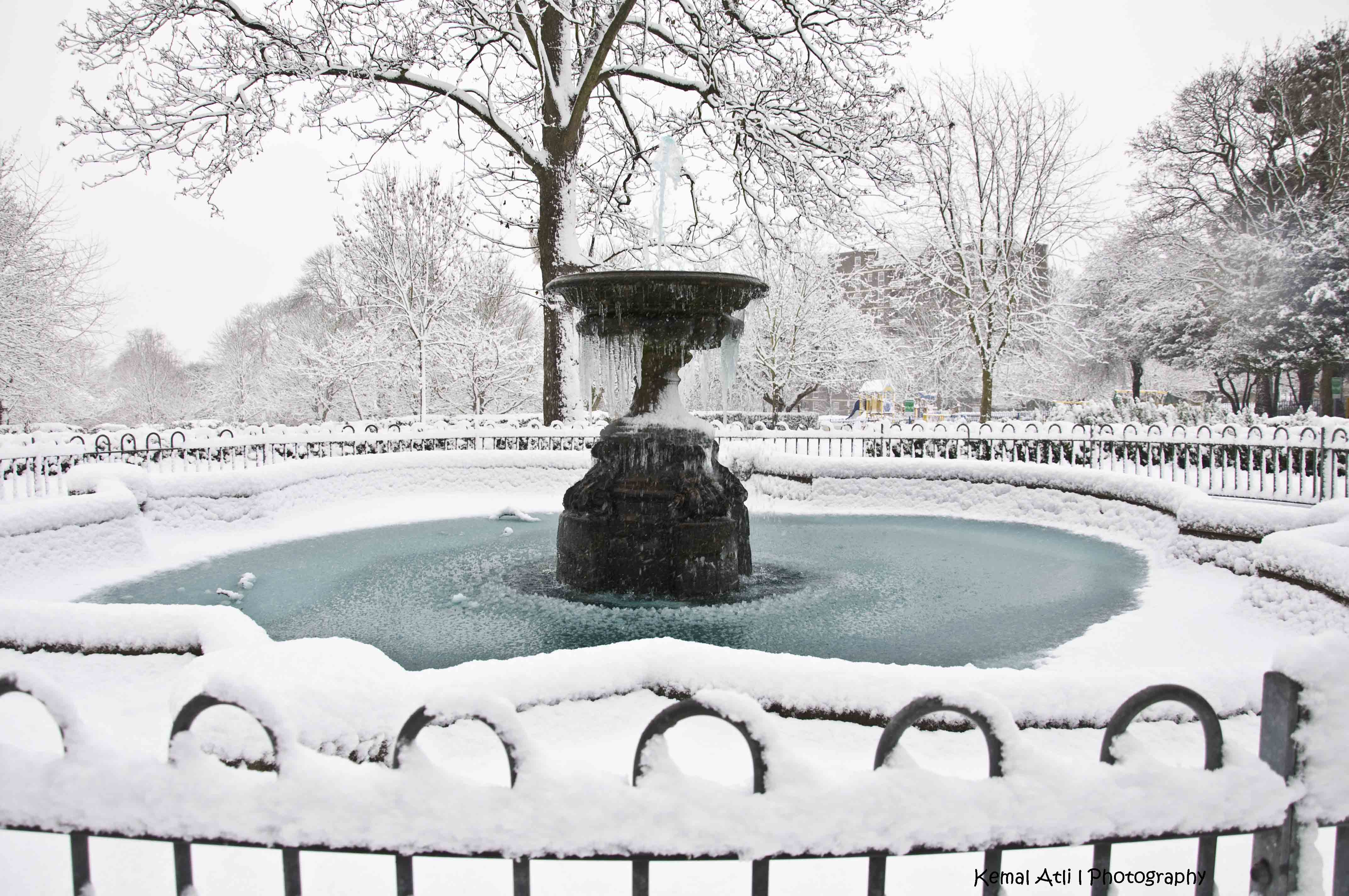
Fountain in Manor Park, Sutton

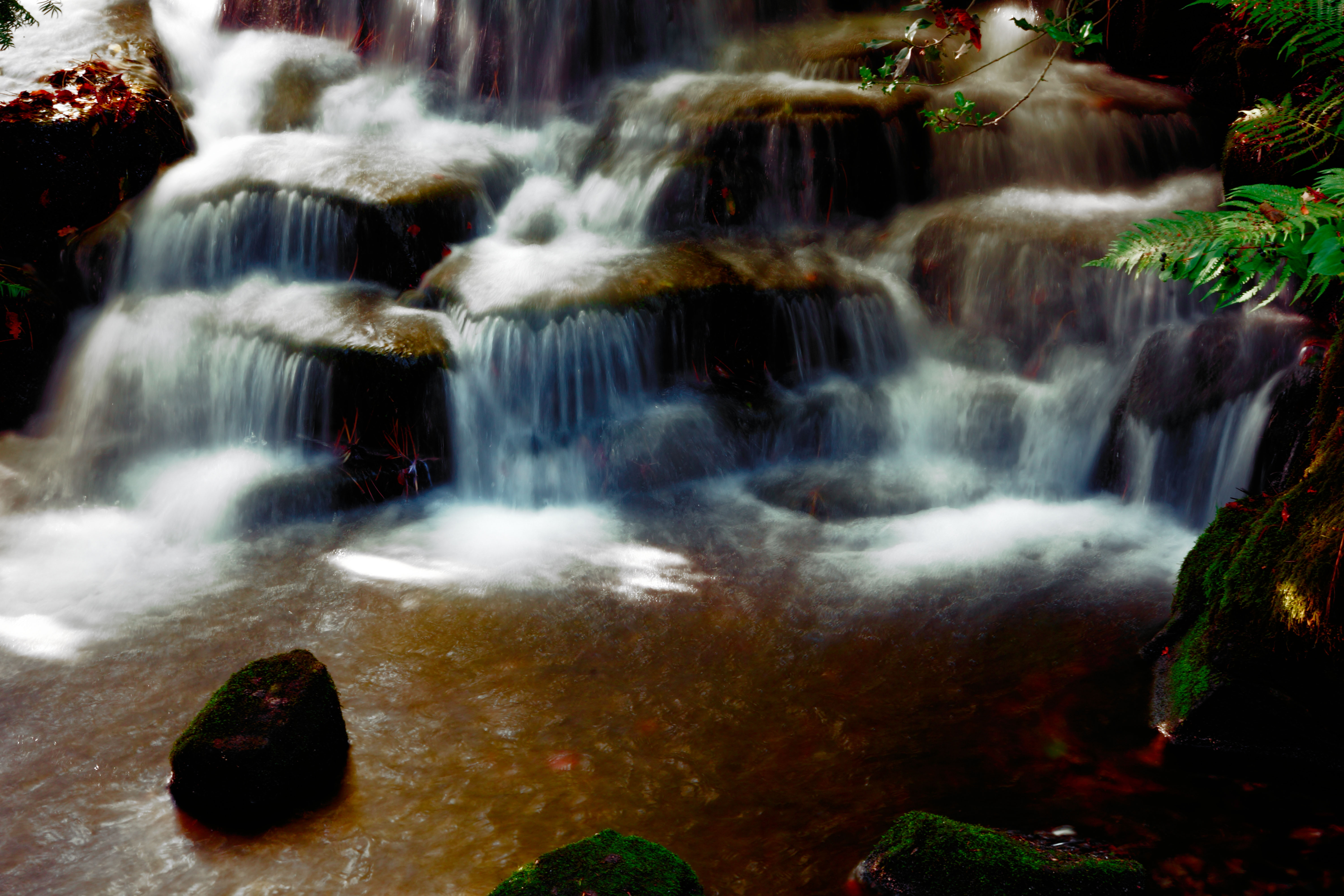
The waterfall in Grove Park

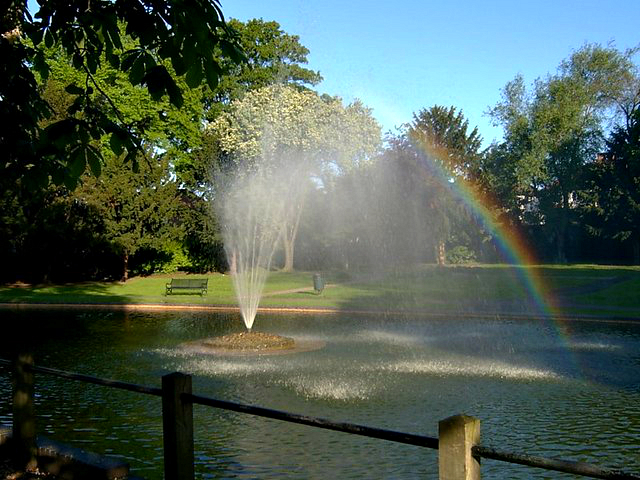
The fountain at Butter Hill

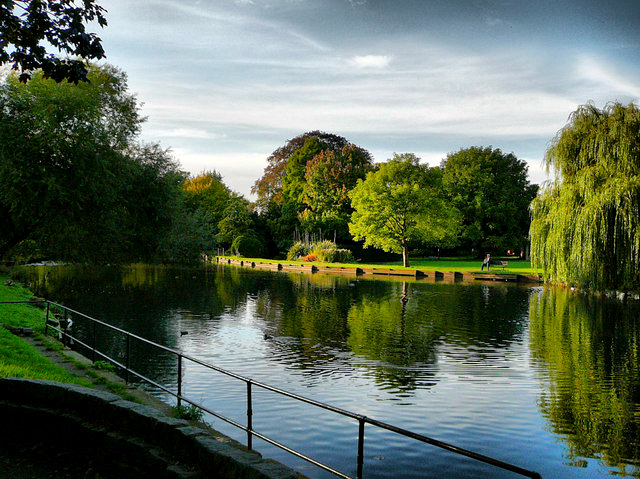
Boating lake, Beddington Park

Leoni Bridge, Grove Park

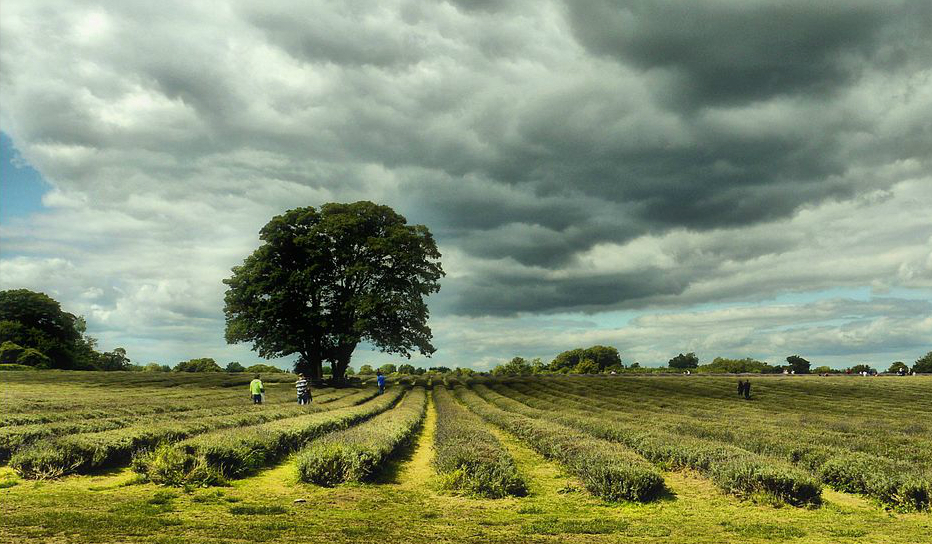

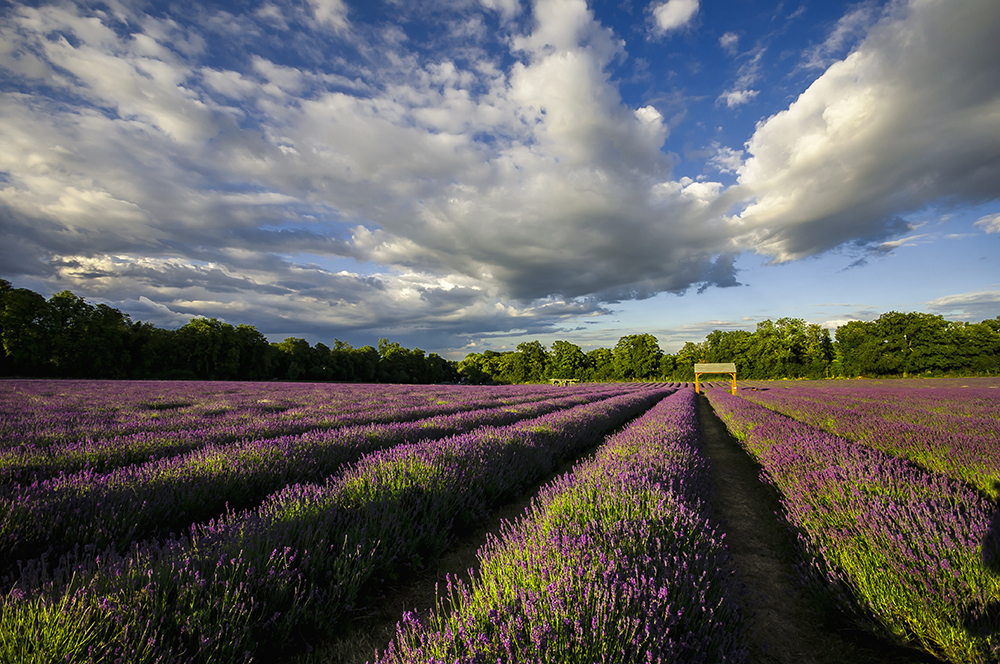
Mayfield Lavender Fields

In total, the London Borough of Sutton has 89 parks and open spaces within it boundaries, representing a total area of 1,500 acres (6.1 km^{2}).

=== Main parks ===
Green spaces range from the compact Manor Park in Sutton town centre and Sutton Green just to the north of Sutton town centre, through the medium-sized Grove Park, which forms a notable part of the Carshalton conservation area, to the large and historic Oaks Park in the south of the borough. In the west is the large Nonsuch Park, the majority of which (including the mansion) lies in the neighbouring borough of Epsom and Ewell.

Just to the north of Sutton town centre there is more extensive green space in the form of Sutton Common, which originally (until the beginning of the 19th century) encompassed the aforementioned Sutton Green. Today, a small portion of Sutton Common is given over to a major junior tennis facility. The common extends both to the east and west of Angel Hill. Slightly further in the opposite direction out of Sutton lie Banstead Common and Banstead Downs—these start a few hundred yards from the southern end of the town, and extend for an additional mile south in the direction of neighbouring Banstead.

Manor Park was created in 1914 on a site in the town centre opposite the police station. Its grounds include the Sutton War Memorial, which was added in 1921. A fountain was added in 1924. In 2010 its new café of straw-bale construction was London's first environmentally friendly building to use this building method.

Features of interest in the Victorian Grove Park include a white Portland stone bridge, known as the Leoni Bridge where Lower Pond meets the park. Upper Mill is recent reconstruction of a watermill that has existed here from Anglo-Saxon times. The cascade is near the footbridge towards the Stone Court corner of the park. The 1.5m fall is now ornamental in design and was reconstructed in the 1960s. Its original purpose was to create a head of water to power Upper Mill.

Oaks Park has a long history. It was substantially laid out for the Earl of Derby in the 1770s, but its villa dates back to around 1750 and is in that era's fashionable landscape style, with trees forming a perimeter screen and placed in artful clumps to suggest a natural landscape.

Nonsuch Park near Cheam in the west is the last surviving part of the Little Park of Nonsuch, a deer hunting park established by Henry VIII of England surrounding the former Nonsuch Palace. The name "Nonsuch" was given as, it was claimed, there was "none such place like it" in Europe.

=== List of parks ===
The main parks in the borough are:

- Beddington Park
- Carshalton Park
- Cheam Park
- Grove Park
- Lakeside
- Manor Park, Sutton town centre
- Mellows Park
- Nonsuch Park
- Oaks Park
- Rosehill Park East and West
- Overton Park
- Poulter Park Poulter Park
- Queen Mary's Park
- Roundshaw Down
- Royston Park
- Seer's Park
- St Helier Open Space
- The Wandle Walkway

=== Local nature reserves ===
Sutton also contains a large number of Local Nature Reserves:

- Anton Crescent Wetland has ponds, willow carr and reedbeds, and the ponds never dry out as the rock formation is Oxford Clay. The pools and mud provide a habitat for birds such as the green sandpiper and common snipe.
- Belmont Pastures is a long narrow triangle north of Belmont railway station. It is an old meadow which formerly belonged to Belmont Hospital.
- Cuddington Meadows is mainly chalk grassland with some scrub. Its most important feature is a variety of unusual flowering plants, including greater knapweed, lady's bedstraw and field scabious.
- Devonshire Avenue Nature Area is mainly neutral grassland, but it has areas of chalk grassland, scrub and trees. A notable species is the small blue butterfly, which is rare in the borough. Plants include the nationally scarce ivy broomrape, and kidney vetch and bird's-foot trefoil.
- Roundshaw Downs was in the 19th century an area of farmland, becoming in the first half of the twentieth Croydon Airport. Most of the site is a mixture of chalk and neutral grassland, but there is also some woodland. Areas of unimproved chalk grassland have species typical of this habitat such as common quaking grass, wild carrot and bird's-foot-trefoil. A grassland flower species is greater yellow rattle, which is nationally protected, and Sutton and Croydon are its national strongholds.
- Ruffett and Big Woods on the edge of the borough near Woodmansterne are the largest continuous area of woodland in the borough. Ruffett Wood is mainly sycamore, with some ash and hazel. It also has some plant species indicative of ancient woodland, such as bluebells. Big Wood has even more sycamore, as well as two large oaks and a stand of wood anemone. The site also has numerous bird species.
- Spencer Road Wetlands has since 1991 been managed by the London Wildlife Trust. The site has reed swamps with wetland vegetation, woodland, a sedge-bed and a pond. Insects include the twin-spotted wainscot and crescent moths, and there are birds such as grey heron, reed warbler and kingfishers.
- Sutton Ecology Centre Grounds is in Carshalton and owned by Sutton Council and managed by it and the Friends of Sutton Ecology Centre. Habitats include ponds, woodland, meadows, marshlands. There are also small demonstration gardens. In the south is the old course of the River Wandle, which is now dry most of the time, but still has yellow flag iris. Margaret's Pool has a number of species of dragonfly and damselfly, and the trees surrounding it are sycamore and ash.
- The Spinney, Carshalton, a small L-shaped reserve, is a mixture of woodland and scrub, with the main trees being plane and elm. Breeding birds include dunnocks, wrens and blackbirds. Other animals include wood boring beetles and foxes.
- Wandle Valley Wetland has open water and seasonal pools, scrub and wet woodland. There are frogs, toads and newts, together with brown hawker dragonflies and birds including blackcaps and wrens.
- Wilderness Island, near Carshalton, is a 2.7-hectare (6.7-acre) island between two arms of the River Wandle and was once the site of a pleasure garden. It features a fish pond, woodland, and meadows. Trees include the black poplar, and there are birds such as the woodpecker, kingfisher and grebe. There is a variety of butterflies including the speckled wood and holly blue, and the rare hornet clearwing moth.

=== Lavender fields ===
There are two historic lavender fields in the borough: at Oaks Way, Carshalton Beeches is a non-profit community project that manages three acres of lavender. The other, a 25-acre commercial site in Croydon Lane called Mayfield, is popular with tourists. It is located just within the Carshalton South and Clockhouse ward within the London Borough of Sutton. This area was once famous as the "Lavender Capital of the World". From the 18th to the early 20th centuries the North Downs of Surrey, with its chalky free-draining soil, ideal for lavender growing, were at the centre of worldwide production of lavender. It was a very prosperous part of the local agriculture. Blue fields could be seen all over Mitcham, Croydon, Wallington, Banstead, Carshalton and Sutton. The scale of the operation can be understood from the fact that the Daily News in 1914 was able to state:

At Carshalton Beeches in every direction the low hill sides of the farm beyond Beeches Halt are swept with the bloomy pastel tint of the lavender flowers.

== Sports facilities and clubs ==
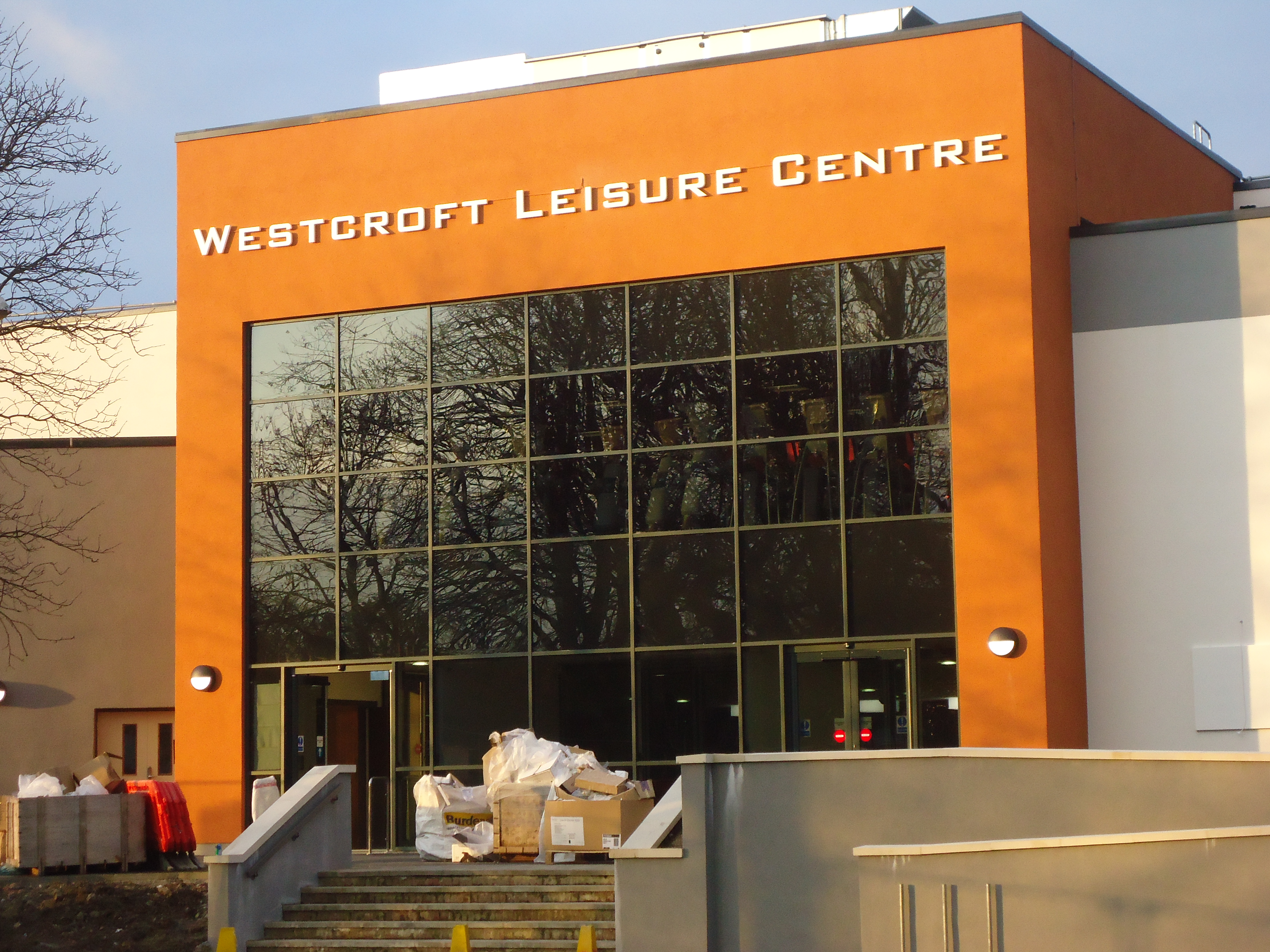
Westcroft centre Carshalton

Football club Sutton United F.C. are based in Sutton at Gander Green Lane and play in the National League. Sutton Common Rovers, who play in the Combined Counties League Premier Division South, also share the ground with Sutton United. Carshalton has two football clubs: Carshalton Athletic F.C. (home ground at The War Memorial Sports Ground, Colston Avenue, and play in the Isthmian League Premier Division) and Carshalton FC (at Beddington Park).

Wallington has a Non-League football club Crescent Rovers F.C. who play at the Wallington Sports & Social Club.

Sutton and Epsom RFC is a rugby union club based at Rugby Lane, in Cheam, London, having been formed in 1881. The Club run six Men's teams and two women's sides, plus they have one of the largest and best run mini and junior rugby sections in the country

The Croydon Pirates despite their name play just inside the borough of Sutton, at Waddon and are one of the most successful teams in the British Baseball Federation.

Sutton Cricket Club is based in Cheam Road, Sutton, (entrance in Gander Green Lane.) The club's 1st XI plays at the highest level of the sport available to it, the England & Wales Cricket Board's, 'Surrey Championship Premier Division'.

Round Towers GAA, Senior Gaelic Football Club, Sean Treacy's Hurling Club and Croydon Camogie Club.

Rosehill boasts an ETTA premier level Table Tennis Club, Rosehill TTC who play in the Sutton & District League and the Thames Valley League.

Cheam Hockey Club is a field hockey club that competes in the London Hockey League.

At the Westcroft Leisure Centre, in Carshalton there are health and fitness facilities including two swimming pools, sports hall, squash court and fitness centre. There is also a children's play area called Kid's Kingdom. Westcroft is also home to Sutton Pumas basketball club.

In 2012 Westcroft underwent a major renovation costing £11 million, bringing improved swimming facilities, a dance studio and beauty treatment rooms. There are eight courts in the sports hall, providing facilities for activities including badminton, gymnastics, trampolining, basketball, football, netball and volleyball.

In addition, Carshalton Library moved to the Westcroft centre, as part of the renovation.

There are also two public basketball courts in the Rosehill district of Sutton borough.

The Sutton and Epsom Weightlifting Club meet at Sutton Arena near to St Hellier's Hospital to the North of Sutton.

== Climate ==
Sutton has a temperate climate in common with most areas of Great Britain, it is similar to that of Greenwich in Inner London: its Köppen climate classification is Cfb. Its mean annual temperature of 9.6 °C is similar to that experienced throughout the Weald, and slightly cooler than nearby areas such as the Sussex coast and central London. Rainfall is considerably below England's average (1971–2000) level of 838 mm, and every month is drier overall than the England average.

The nearest weather station is at Gatwick Airport.

== Town twinning ==
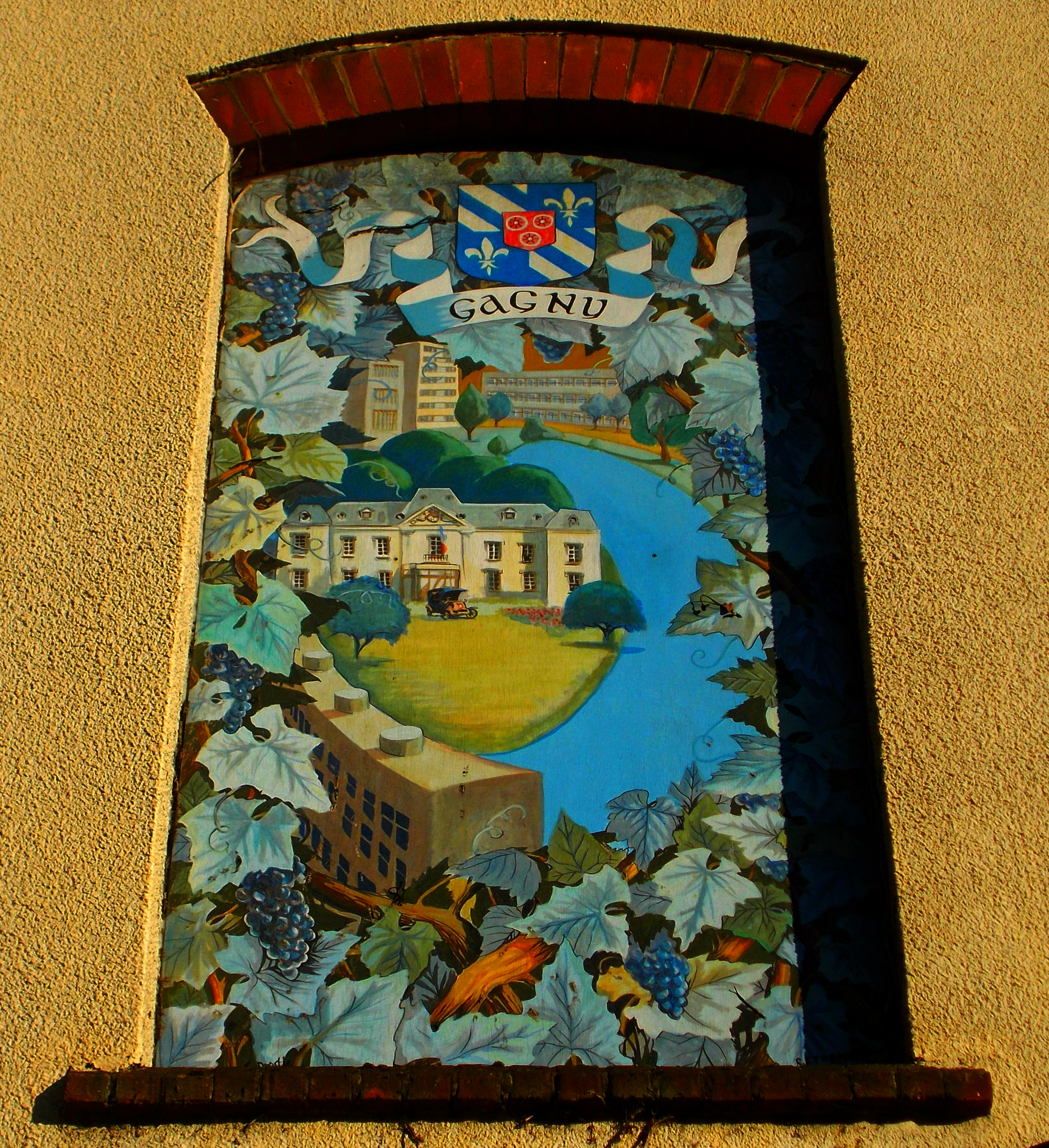
The painting of Gagny

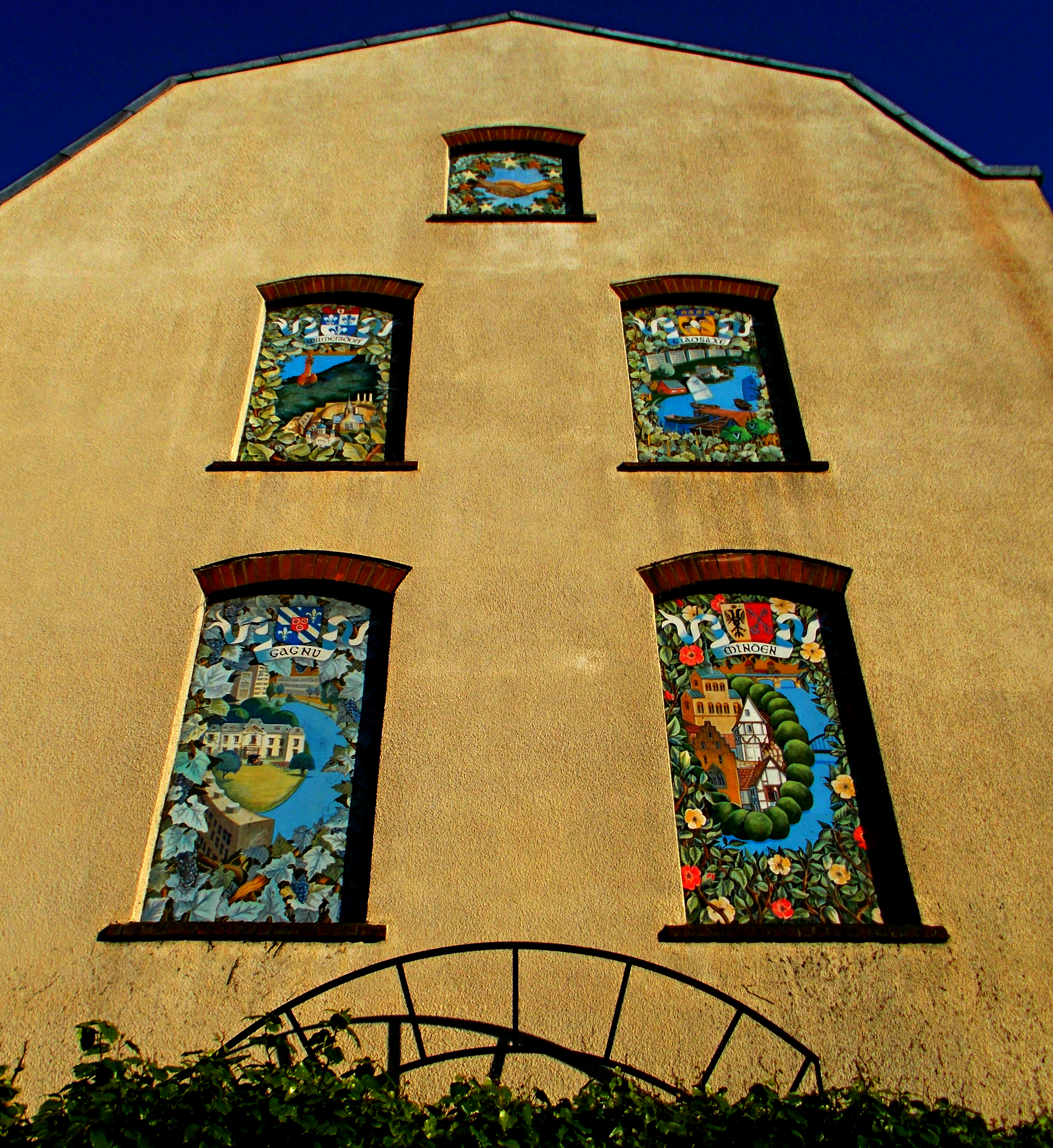
Sutton twin towns mural

Sutton's twin towns are as follows:

- Gagny, France
- Gladsaxe, Denmark
- Minden, Germany
- Charlottenburg-Wilmersdorf, Germany

In addition, there is a friendship link with:

- Tavarnelle, Italy

The Sutton twin towns mural on a building in Sutton town centre is made up of individual paintings of all the twin towns. It was created in 1993. The building is at the junction of Sutton High Street and Sutton Court Road.

== Notable individuals ==
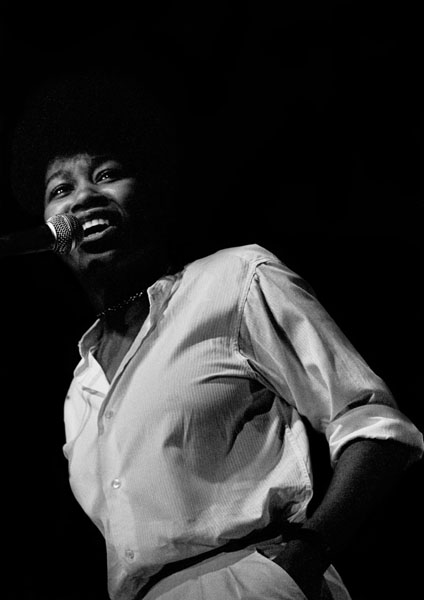
Joan Armatrading in the 1970s, when she lived in Sutton

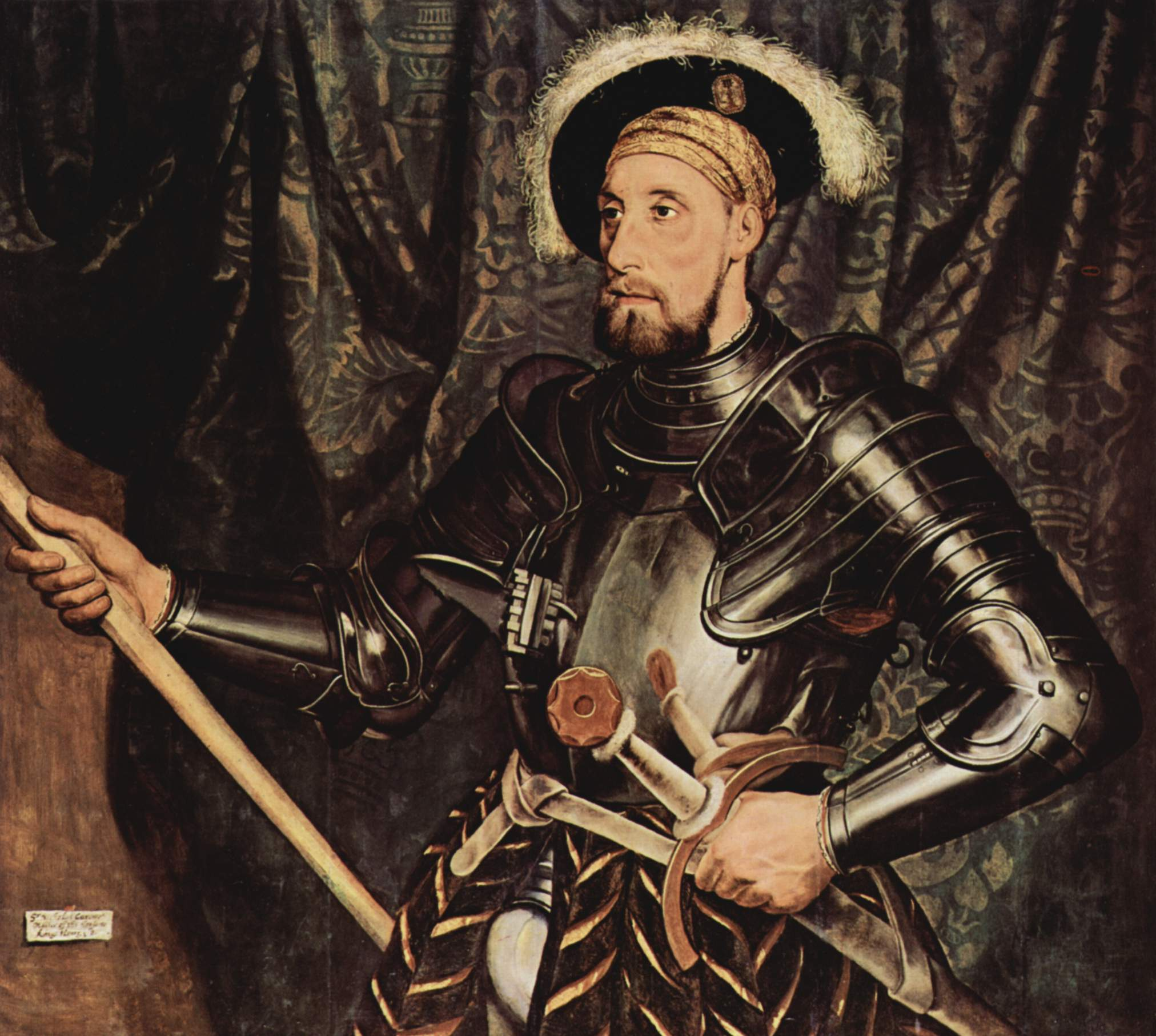
Sir Nicholas Carew, courtier

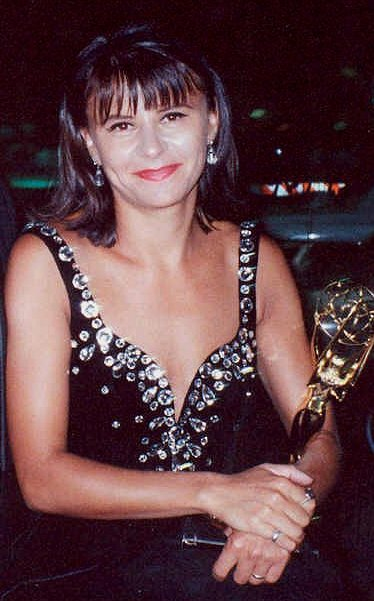
Tracey Ullman grew up in the borough

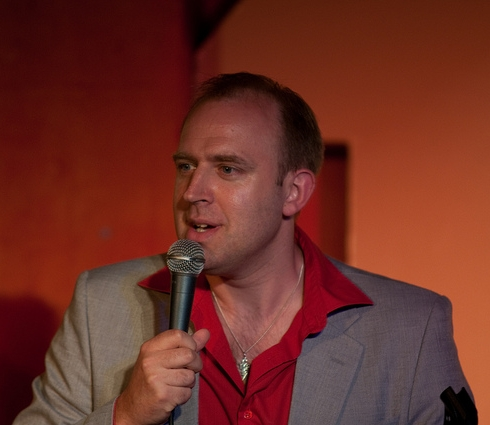
Tim Vine

- Tom Abbott, broadcaster for Golf Channel and NBC
- Martin Adams, BDO Darts World Champion
- Joan Armatrading, singer-songwriter & musician, lived in Sutton in the 1970s.
- Harry Aikines-Aryeetey, athlete, attended Greenshaw High School
- Terry and Jonathan Austen, micronation creators
- Ben Barnes, actor, attended Homefield Preparatory School.
- Jeff Beck, musician – rock guitarist: one of the three noted guitarists to have played with the Yardbirds (the other two being Eric Clapton and Jimmy Page).
- David Bellamy, broadcaster and botanist, attended Sutton Grammar School.
- Sally Bercow, wife of the former Speaker of the House of Commons, John Bercow.
- Johnny Borrell, guitarist, singer and frontman of the band Razorlight.
- Seb Brown, Sutton United goalkeeper, attended Cheam High School
- Paul Burstow, MP for Sutton and Cheam was born in Carshalton, and was educated at Carshalton College
- Angus Calder, writer, historian and academic
- Rob Davis, Lead Guitarist of Mud
- Lord Peter Ritchie Calder, author, journalist and academic
- Sir Nicholas Carew, sheriff of Surrey and Sussex, Master of the King's Horse, executed by Henry VIII
- Sir Francis Carew, grandson of the above, of Beddington Park, Elizabethan horticulturalist
- Noël Coward, actor and playwright lived in Lenham Road, Sutton until the age of six
- John Clinch, cricketer
- James Cracknell, Olympic gold medallist in rowing
- Quentin Crisp, writer, author, raconteur
- Clark Datchler, lead singer of Johnny Hates Jazz
- Sir John Fellowes, 1st Baronet (c. 1671–1724), of the South Sea Company
- Eddie George later Lord George (1938–2009) (16 September 1938 – 18 April 2009), Governor of the Bank of England 1993–2003.
- Brett Goldstein, actor/writer born in Sutton in 1980.
- Les Gray, lead vocalist of Mud
- Lord Hardwicke, (1690–1764) Lord Chancellor
- Darius Henderson, footballer
- Catherine Holman, actress
- James Hunt, Formula One winning racing driver.
- Penelope Keith, actress, and famous for her role in The Good Life, was born in Sutton.
- Ruth Kelly, former Labour Party member of parliament and Transport Secretary, attended Sutton High School.
- Jaden Ladega, actor, was born and raised in Sutton.
- Rebecca Litchfield, photographer.
- Peter Loader, cricketer
- Bradley McIntosh, member of the band S Club 7, attended Greenshaw High School.
- Sir John Major, former Conservative Prime Minister
- Gary Mason, boxer
- Katie Melua, singer, songwriter, and musician
- David Mitchell (born 1980), cricketer
- Simon Conway Morris, palaeontologist, specifically research of Burgess Shale type fauna
- Dave Mount, drummer of Mud
- Joshua Pascoe, Played Ben Mitchell in Eastenders
- Peter Alfred Penfold, diplomat, attended Sutton Grammar School.
- Dr John Radcliffe, royal physician and MP see Radcliffe Camera, Radcliffe Infirmary and the Radcliffe Observatory
- Michael Reeves, film director and screenwriter, best known for the 1968 film Witchfinder General
- Sir Cliff Richard, singer and songwriter, attended Stanley Park Junior School
- Rebecca Romero, Olympic cycling champion
- Joanna Rowsell Shand, Olympic gold medallist in women's pursuit cycling
- Dora Russell (born Dora Black, 1894–1986), author, feminist and progressive campaigner, attended Sutton High School.
- Sir William Scawen, merchant who purchased Carshalton manor
- Sir Harry Secombe, singer, comedian and entertainer. Member of the Goon Show cast.
- Jack Simmons, historian
- Tim Smith, frontman of Cardiacs
- Alec Stewart, cricketer
- Ian Stewart, co-founder of the Rolling Stones.
- Neil Sullivan, footballer
- Sarah Tullamore, actress and singer
- Tracey Ullman, stage and television actress, comedian, singer, director, and screenwriter, grew up in Hackbridge.
- Tim Vine, actor and comedian
- David Weir, multi-Olympic gold medallist, Paralympic athlete
- Helen Young, BBC Weather Presenter and former BBC Weather Centre Manager lives here.
- Zacron, born Richard Drew, designer of the Led Zeppelin III album cover.

== See also ==
- Grade I and II* listed buildings in the London Borough of Sutton
