= Parks and open spaces in the London Borough of Sutton =

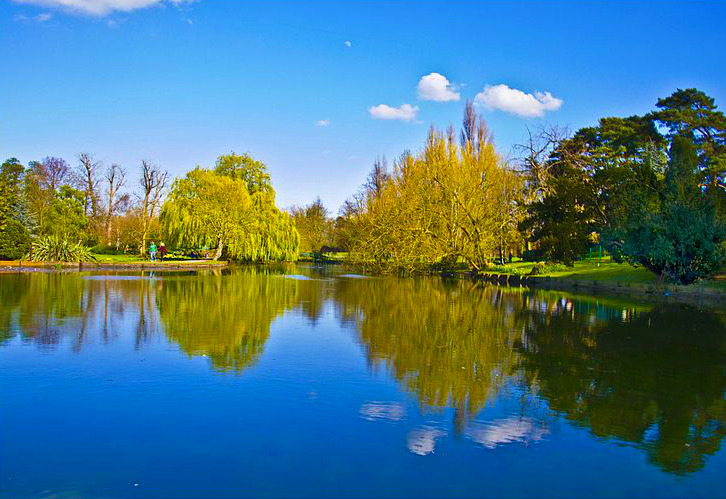
The lake in Beddington Park, London Borough of Sutton

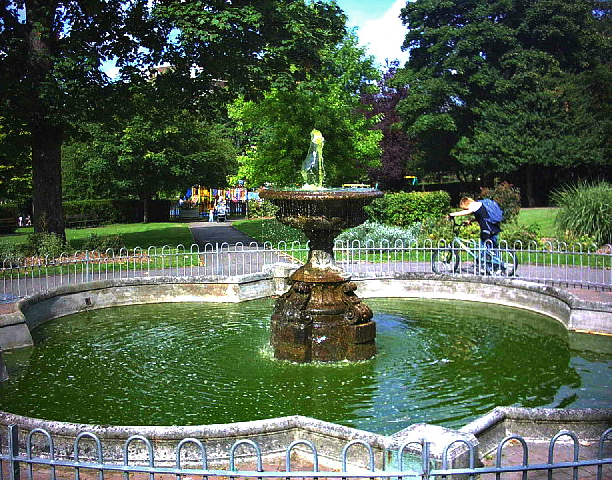
Fountain in Manor Park, Sutton Town Centre

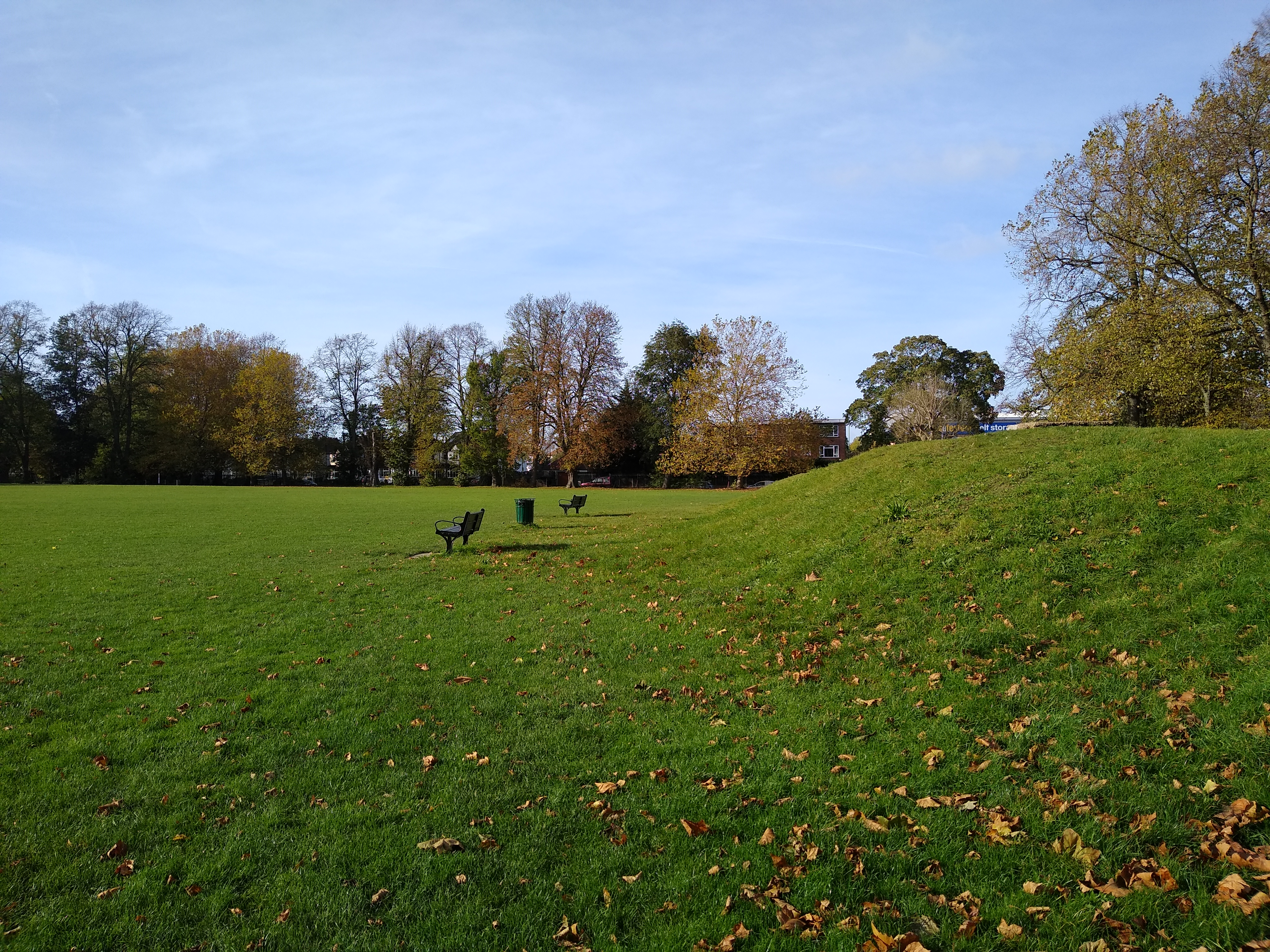
Wrythe Recreation Ground

The London Borough of Sutton, one of the peripheral London boroughs, has 89 parks and open spaces within its boundaries, a total area of 1500 acres (6 km^{2}). Varied in size and layout, green spaces range from the compact Manor Park in Sutton town centre, through the medium-sized Grove Park, which forms part of the Carshalton Village conservation area, to the large and historic Oaks Park in the south of the borough. In the west of the borough is the large Nonsuch Park. The main parks are:

- Beddington Park
- Benhill Recreation Ground
- Carshalton Park
- Cheam Park
- Collingwood Recreation Ground
- Corrigan Avenue Recreation Ground, Coulsdon
- Grove Park, Carshalton
- Lakeside
- Manor Park, Sutton town centre
- Nonsuch Park
- Oaks Park, Carshalton
- Overton Park
- Mellows Park
- Poulter Park
- Queen Mary's Park
- Reigate Avenue Playing Fields (known locally as The Daisy Field)
- Roundshaw Downs
- Rosehill Park East (including Greenshaw Woods) and West
- Royston Park
- Seears Park
- St Helier Open Space
- Sutton Common Park
- Sutton Green
- The Wandle Walkway
- The Wrythe Recreation Ground
- Thomas Wall Park
