= Life Centre =

Life Centre or life center may refer to:

== Places ==
- Canada Life Centre, an indoor sports area in Winnipeg
- Christian Life Centre, group of churches in Australia
- The Life Centre, a special school located in Diego Martin, Trinidad and Tobago
- Life Center Academy, a private school in Burlington County, New Jersey, US
- Mobile Life Centre, research institute in Stockholm, Sweden
- Plymouth Life Centre, leisure centre in Plymouth, England
- Sea Life Centre, international chain of commercial aquariums
- Southern Life Centre, a skyscraper in Johannesburg, South Africa
- Sutton Life Centre, community centre in Sutton, England
- Sun Life Centre, headquarters of Sun Life Financial in Toronto, Canada

== Other uses ==
- Crisis pregnancy center, also known as life-centered pregnancy counselling, organisation that dissuades women from having abortions

== See also ==
- Lathe center, a tool that has been accurately positioned on an axis
