= Sutton Common =

Area of London, England

Coordinates: 51°23′N 0°12′W

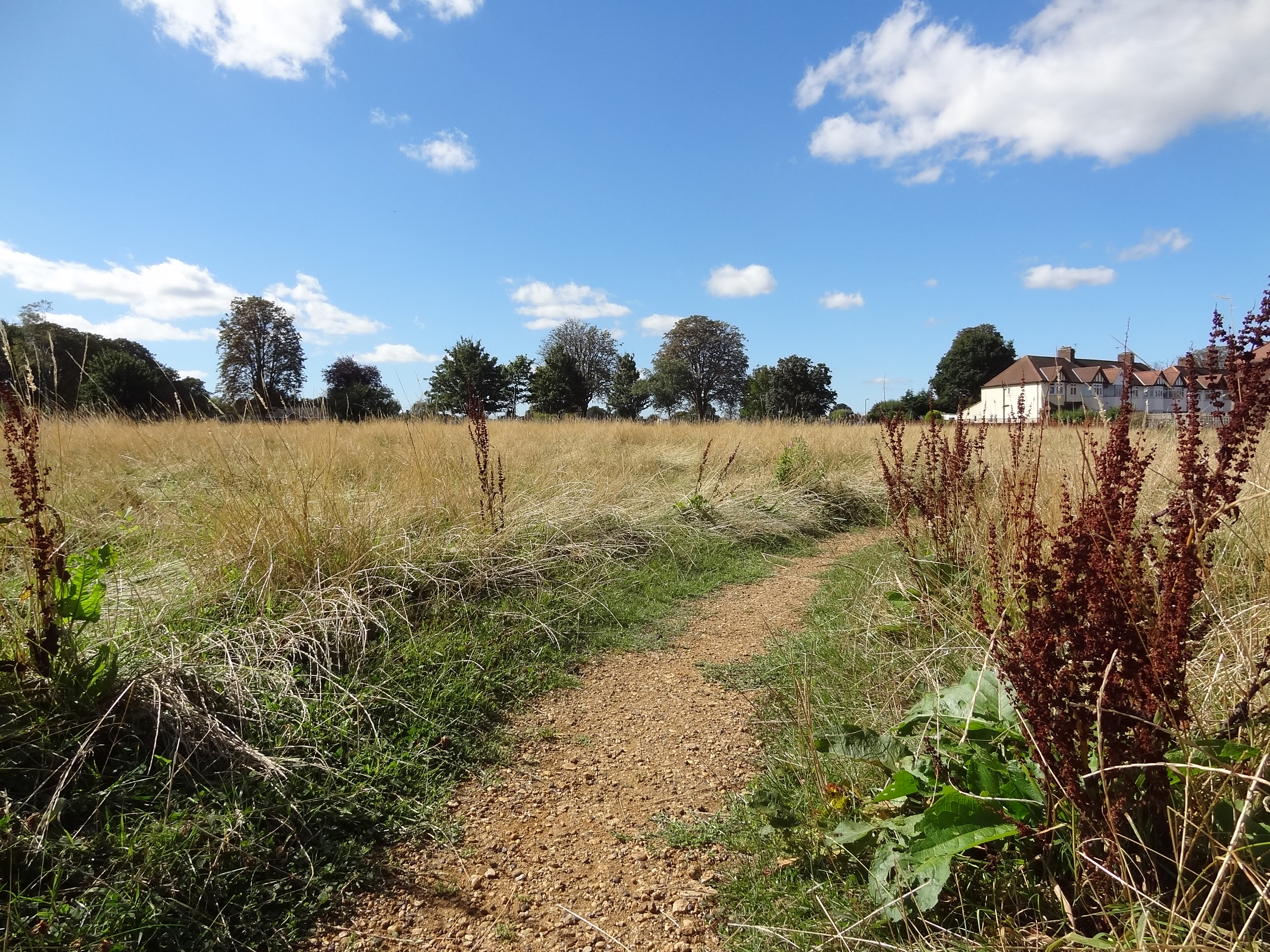
Sutton Common Park

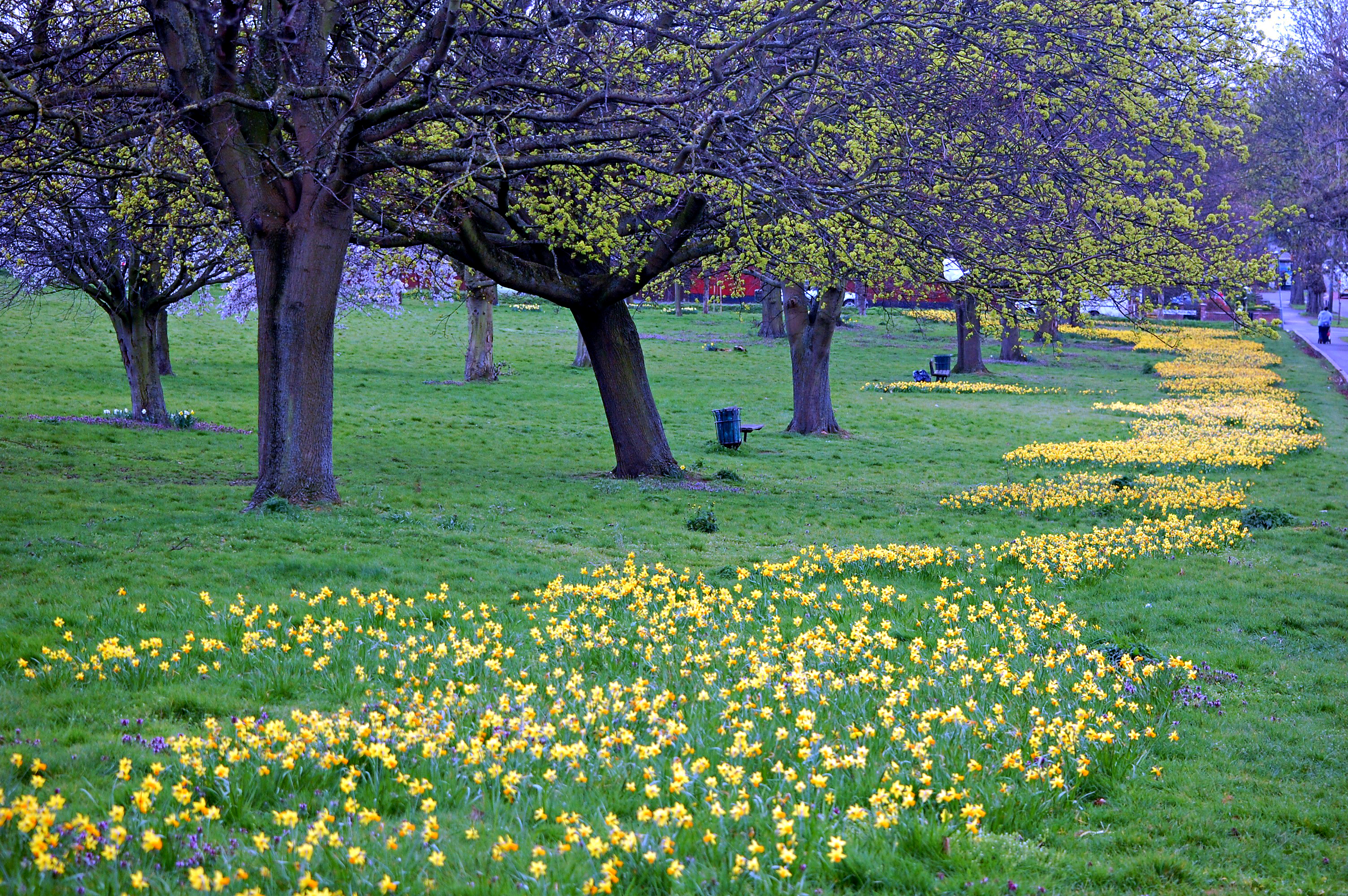
Rosehill Park East

Sutton Common is the name of former common land and a district and neighbourhood located in Sutton, London. The area is mostly located within the London Borough of Sutton, with some of the streets to the north and west of Sutton Common Park adjoining Lower Morden and Morden within the London Borough of Merton. Much of the area is taken up by the large Kimpton Park commercial and industrial estate, adjoining the A217 (Oldfields Road). It is served by Sutton Common railway station. The area to the south and east of Oldfields Road uses an SM1 postcode and the area to the north and west uses SM3.

The borders of the area are generally regarded to be the main Pyl Brook stream to the south, bordering West Sutton and North Cheam; the East Pyl Brook to the north where it borders Rosehill and St Helier; Benhilton to the east; and Lower Morden and Morden Park to the west. Sutton Common is within the Stonecot and Sutton North wards of Sutton Council. What remains of the former common can be found at Sutton Green, Sutton Common Park, Reigate Avenue Recreation Ground, Hamilton Avenue Recreation Ground, Thomas Wall Park in Rosehill, and Rosehill Park East and West.

== History ==
=== Origin as common land ===
The original Sutton Common was, as the name suggests, common land including Oldfields Farm to the east, located at what is now Rosehill, and Stonecot Hill to the west, through which ran the Roman road from London to Chichester known as Stane Street and which is now the modern A24. Before the process of enclosure began, the common was known as "Sutton Heath" and is likely to have covered an area as far north and east as Morden (then located much further to the south than it is now, around St Lawrence Church), Mitcham and the banks of the River Wandle, approximately where Benhilton and St. Helier are now. The land was not especially productive for agriculture on account of its heavy clay content and so it was mostly used by local people for grazing animals and to cut peat, turf and timber for fuel.

The exact extent of Sutton Heath or Common and who held the manorial rights to it seems to have been a matter for heated debate. In 1408 there was a serious dispute between the Abbot of Chertsey and Nicholas Carew, lord of the manor of Carshalton:

Nicholas Carew by the counsel of malignant men impleaded the lord Thomas Culverdon concerning a certain pasture in Sutton called Sutton Heth pretending that he has a lordship in all the said Common and that it ought to be called Kersaulton Heth not Sutton Heth. To which it was answered by the counsel of the lord Abbot that the aforesaid Abbot and all his predecessors were seised of the said Common as parcel of the manor of Sutton from the first foundation of their Church until they were impeded and gravely harmed by the said Nicholas Carew and for this they have shown many praiseworthy evidences; at length, after many altercations the parties submit themselves to ordinance and arbitration by two trustworthy persons.

The judgment was, that the Abbot and Nicholas should have common lordship to an area defined. The claim of Nicholas Carew may have been based upon an agreement in 1232, in which an entry mentions a Final Concord between the Prior of Merton and Abbot of Chertsey: "Common of pasture in Sutton up to a ditch called Middildich...the Prior and his successors shall have common in Sutton whenever the men of Kersaulton have it."

=== 16th to 18th centuries ===
During the early modern period, Stane Street was alive with traffic of the greatest importance. Henry VIII, circa 1538–1540, took 3,050 tonnes of stone from the despoiled Merton Priory to build Nonsuch Palace: it was carted along Sutton's boundary at a cost of twopence per mile. In 1643, during the English Civil War, Royalist troops passed along the road in retreat, and three of their soldiers are buried in the churchyard of St Dunstan's, Cheam. In 1831 Ewell Fair had 30,000 Downs sheep on sale; large flocks would travel along the road to London markets.

By the 18th century, the main Sutton Common area was focused on the plateau and the old highway from London to Sutton where Sutton Common Road is today, between Stonecot Hill and Angel Hill. Well into the 19th century the landscape would have been contiguous with other commons nearby like Mitcham Common and Thornton Heath to the east, Merton Common to the north and Cheam Common to the west, if one included some of the privately farmed fields between them.

Like many other Surrey commons and heaths, during the 17th century the area became associated with highwaymen, who took advantage of the difficult terrain and distance from the centre of law enforcement in London to plunder wealthy travellers going to and from the horse races at Banstead Downs or the fashionable spa town of Epsom and, later in the 18th century, Brighton. The word 'highwayman' first appeared in the English language in 1617, not long before Epsom became a spa in 1620 and the first recorded horse race took place at Banstead Downs in 1625. Farmers going between the markets in Ewell and London also made attractive targets as they would often be carrying large amounts of cash. On 14 October 1685, Morgan Bourne of Stepney was found guilty and subsequently executed for counterfeiting Half Crown coins in Sutton; counterfeit coins could come in useful for paying highwaymen, and gaming debts. By 1685 a prominent gallows had been erected at Thornton Heath on the London to Newhaven road to deter them; it appeared on maps between 1690 and 1724 as "Gallows Green" and stood at the junction with the road leading to Wallington (where modern Hackbridge is today) and Sutton. Another gibbet stood to the south of Sutton at the Banstead crossroads on the Downs.

In 1718 the highway from London to Sutton was declared to be dangerous to persons, horses and cattle, impassable for five months in the year. At that time the route into Sutton was via Morden and the mile-long level causeway across Sutton Common. In the same year, the surveyor William Brazier made a plan of the manor of Sutton and measured the whole of the Common as far as Pylford Bridge (the north-west boundary of the manor) and close under the hedge to the corner of Lower Morden Lane: he measured the Common as being 241 acres 2 roods 31 perches in size with roads 20 feet wide. The highway's impassibility and Sutton's winter isolation might have been a factor which influenced George Simpson, a highwayman and member of a notorious gang robbing mail coaches leaving London, to hide with a sister in Sutton during late 1721 and early 1722; he subsequently returned to London where he was arrested, tried and hanged in May of that year. Reports in London's newspapers and Grub Street periodicals about highwaymen in the vicinity of Sutton and Banstead Downs seem to have peaked in the 1730s. In one account of a robbery which took place on Saturday 27 May 1738, quite possibly on the highway at the time through Sutton Common:

two Highwaymen robbed five Coaches and a Chaise between Sutton in Surrey and London; they took from one Gentleman a Watch which he valued very much, on which his Footman rode after the Highwaymen, and insisted on having the Watch back again, or else he would pursue them 'till he could raise the Country, and as he was much better mounted than they, he had it in his Power to avoid any Thing they could attempt against his Life; however he told them on Honour he would take no Notice of them, provided they would return the Watch, which they complied with, and he brought it back to his Master.

One Surrey folk-rhyme refers to the area's popular reputation during the 18th century for both agriculture and criminality:

Sutton for mutton, Carshalton for beeves;
Epsom for whores, and Ewell for thieves.

Proximity to London provided readily accessible targets for Metropolitan criminals travelling outwards, and to 'local' thieves who were attracted to crime by the ease with which stolen items could be liquidated in the nearby capital. Many highwaymen resided in the capital while foraying outwards, and those who were arrested were often captured 'in town'. According to John Fielding, most of the highwaymen who operated within 20 miles of the capital retired to London for shelter: the conurbation provided them with anonymity and so was the: "...best place for such beasts of prey to shelter in." In 1745, when the Jacobite rising had made manifest to the government the shortcomings of the roads for the rapid transport of troops, the route through Mitcham and Sutton to Banstead Downs, which had been the scene of a failed royalist rising by the Earl of Holland in 1648, was measured and milestones were erected. This meant that, from the mid-18th century, the Common was crossed by two busy roads heading from London to the south; at one time 17 coaches were leaving London for the coast daily, most passing through in the early morning to arrive at the Cock Inn in Sutton for breakfast at 9 a.m., whilst the coach changed horses.

Sutton Common first seems to have appeared on a topographical map of Surrey made in 1749 by the King's Geographer, Emanuel Bowen; it was partially indicated by a marsh, as was the area now known as Morden Park to the west, called Malden Common on the map. The accompanying text states:

There are several Downs and Commons in this County, where the Air is extremely wholesome, especially about Dorking; esteem'd the sweetest in England. Many of the Nobility, Gentry and Rich Citizens have their seats on or near them; where also they divert themselves with Horse Races, and Hunting. This abounds with Wallnut Trees, more than any other County in England, the Soil being proper for them...The Fuel for Firing was formerly mostly Wood, but that being now almost destroy'd, they burn Peat, Turf and Cole.

Other 18th century maps, like the 1779 map of Surrey made by Antonio Zatta, sometimes show Sutton Common as a woodland feature. It is interesting that Zatta's map does not show the route of the turnpike road from Mitcham to Sutton and Banstead Downs which was constructed in 1755, possibly because it was poorly maintained and unpopular amongst travellers at the time: in 1755 milestones further to the south were uprooted or defaced, and in 1774 the gate at Tadworth was cut down; a reward of £21 for information was offered in vain. The old route of Stane Street from Morden to Ewell via Stonecot Hill may have been more popular. Maps of the period showing the country round London record a place called "Pylford Bridge" or "Pistford Bridge", where the Pyl Brook river met the London Road at Stonecot Hill, a place name which has since been lost to history. In 1800, there were no people living along the three or so miles of highway between Morden and Ewell, and there was only one farm of significance on the two and a half miles of highway from Mitcham to Sutton.

During this period we also find references to "Bonhill Common" to the east of Sutton Common. In 1741 the Lord of the Manor and James Baker hedged, ditched and ploughed on Bonhill Common (north-east of the village) in an attempted enclosure; the copyholders fought and won their ancient rights to depasture their cattle, levant and couchant, and to cut bushes and furze on the Common four months in the year. In 1750 every Sutton householder was allowed to turn one cow on to the Common; those holding ten acres, two cows; thirty acres, three cows; and so on to a maximum of six cows. That year the Herdsman received an halfpenny a week for one cow, three farthings for more than one. A 1792 history of Surrey describes Sutton:

The cultivated land is principally arable; the proportion of meadow being very small; the downs and commons are extensive. The downs adjoin those of Banstead, and are grazed by sheep. The mutton is noted for its small size and fine flavour. The inhabitants have a right of turning out their cattle upon Sutton and Bonhill commons in this parish, during a certain part of the year...The soil to the north of the village is a strong clay, between which and the chalky lands there runs a narrow vein of sand.

In 1793 the bounds of the parish were defined in great detail after Morden residents had encroached upon the Common. The matter was taken to court where, after Brazier's 1718 plan was referred to, judgment was given in favour of Sutton.

=== 19th century ===
Sutton Common was enclosed in c. 1810–1812, which helped to confine criminals on horseback to the roads and provide building sites; here the water supply was good and the roads hard. Under the terms of the enclosure award, a small part of the common at Sutton Green was reserved as a recreation ground. At around this time one of the last and most audacious highway robberies took place in the area. On 5 February 1812, a blue coach travelling between Sutton and Reigate was robbed of three or four thousand pounds in bank notes: it remained an unsolved mystery. In 1816 a spur road from Redhill cut out Reigate, reducing the number of coaches using the Sutton route. Nonetheless negative public perception of Sutton, possibly linked to its reputation as a haven for highwaymen, persisted into the 1820s, as the journalist William Cobbett noted in his Rural Rides in May 1823: "From London to Reigate, through Sutton, is about as villainous a tract as England contains. The soil is a mixture of gravel and clay, with big yellow stones in it, sure sign of really bad land."

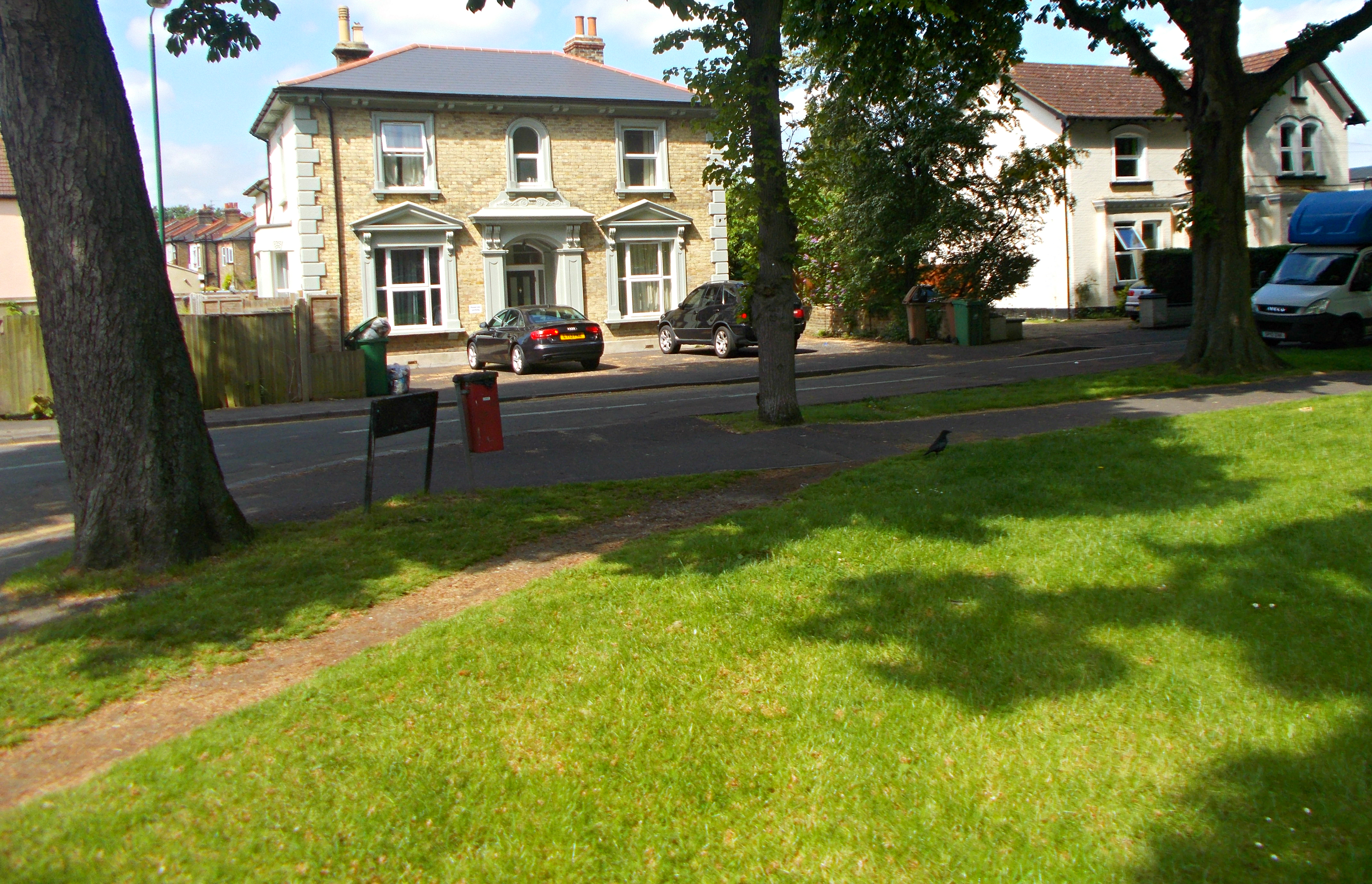
Victorian houses by Sutton Green

In the 1840s, Sutton Common only had two farms and a few cottages, but by 1868 there were some 29 large residences, some of which were located in the new, upmarket parish of Benhilton on the eastern side of Angel Hill. The grandest houses on the Sutton Common side of Angel Hill included Stonecot House; Hill House on Ridge Road; Oldfields; Southfields; and the largest house in the area, Fairlands, which was demolished in the 1920s to make way for Reigate Avenue: it is now commemorated by the road on the site called Fairlands Road. Later villas included Broomloan and Hilton Grange at the junction between Sutton Common Road and what was called Glensham Lane (now Clensham Lane); Aysgarth, which is now a block of modern flats called Aysgarth Court; and Hallmead Farm (known locally as Skinner's Farm after the dairyman who owned it at the turn of the 20th century) near Hallmead Road and Stayton Road. A sewage works was built on what is now the Kimpton Park commercial and industrial estate and Sutton Cemetery, located on Alcorn Close, was built next door in 1889. It was formally opened and partially consecrated on 13 March 1890.

=== 20th century ===
Kelly's Directory of Surrey 1903 contains the following entry: "The [Sutton] Common runs westward from Benhilton church for about 1 mile, and contains some mansions and villa residences. The land has been sold in plots to small freeholders and the manorial rights extinguished. The soil of the eastern part of the parish [i.e. the parish of Benhilton] is light; subsoil, chalk; the western part, heavy; subsoil, clay. The chief crops are wheat, barley and oats."

By 1913, large parts of the West Sutton area were fully developed but Sutton Common was still mostly open fields and a few allotment gardens. A large fireworks manufactory, "Brocks' Fireworks Factory", was located in the direction of what is now North Cheam, having moved there from Selhurst in 1901 where it supplied fireworks for displays at the Crystal Palace. In 1913 a small number of cottages, presumably intended to house the factory workers, had been built to the south west of the sewage works along Gander Green Lane. The factory was demolished in the late 1930s and is now commemorated by the road name "Brocks Drive". After the end of the First World War, more houses were built and Sutton Common railway station opened on 5 January 1930 (see main article). By 1937, Broomloan and Hilton Grange had been demolished and replaced by blocks of flats and streets of terraced housing for workers, including Broomloan Lane; in addition, a sports ground had been developed at what is now Rosehill Park West. Both Sutton Common Park and Reigate Avenue Recreation Ground had also been laid out. Hamilton Avenue, Oldfields Road, Blenheim Road and Stayton Road were some of the other streets built between the wars, and much of the area was developed at the same time as the St Helier estate to the north and Benhilton to the east, including most of the area to the west of Ridge Road and Forest Road bordering Stonecot Hill, although not to the same standards of architectural cohesion or urban planning.

== Today ==
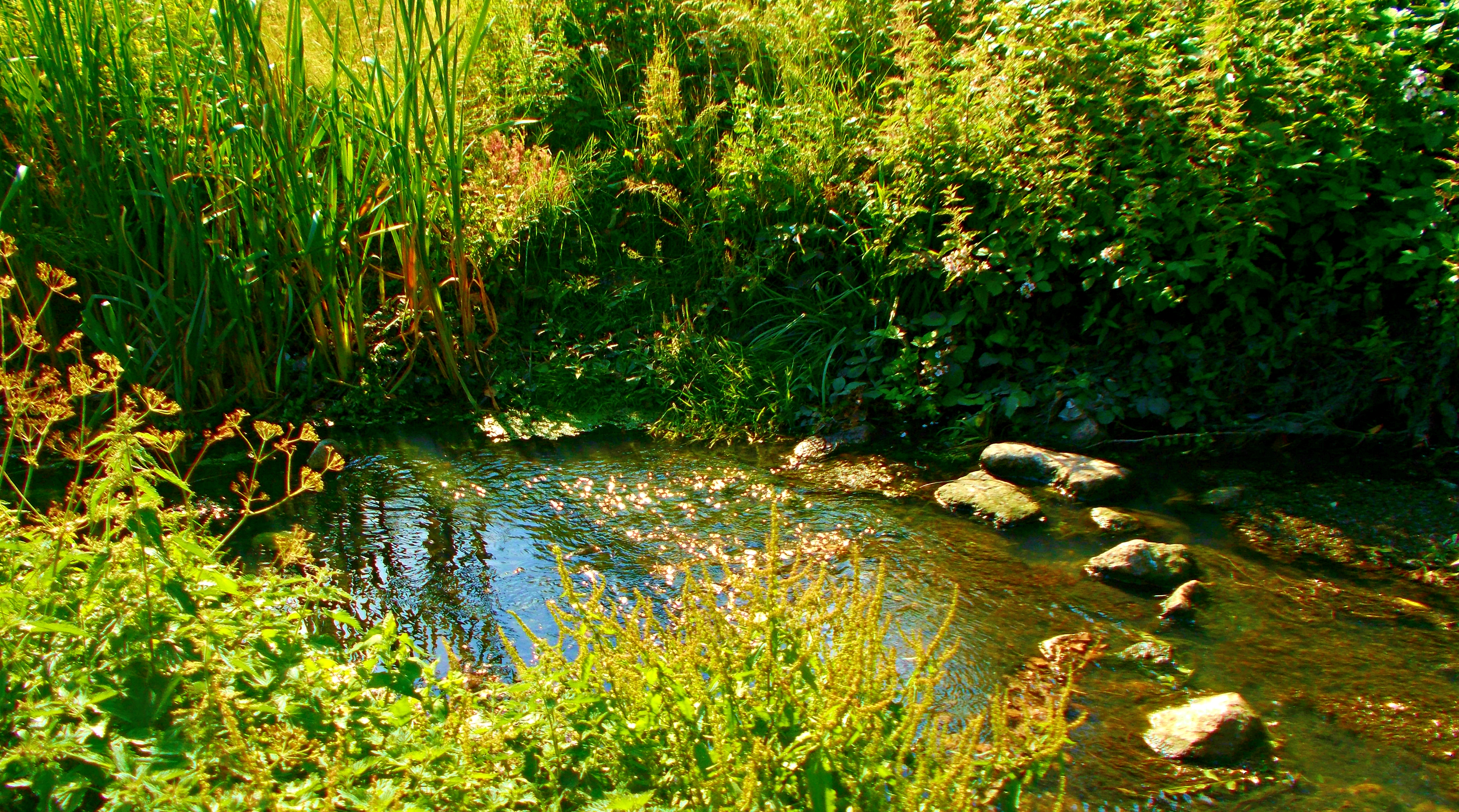
Pyl Brook stream in Hamilton Avenue Recreation Ground

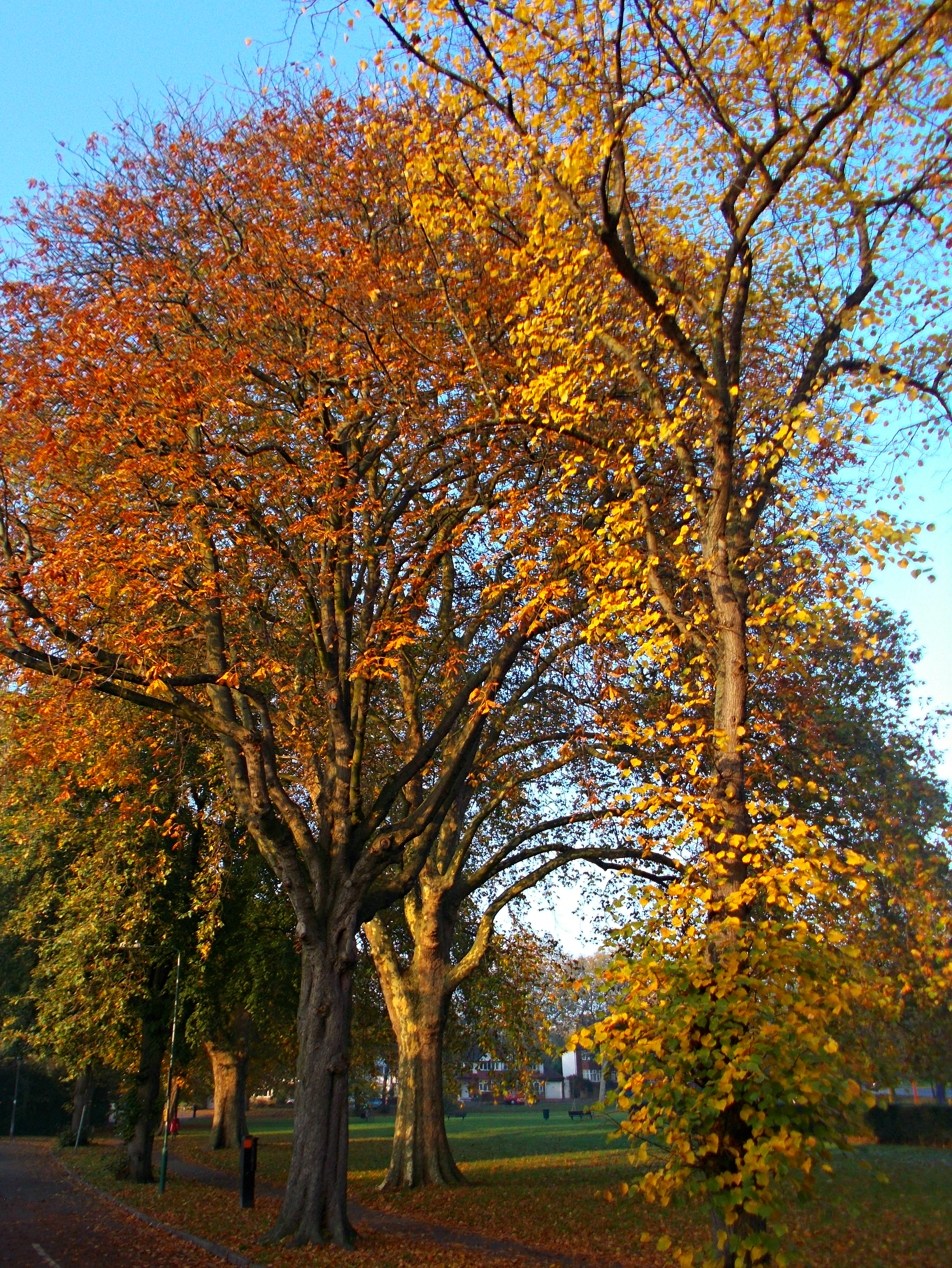
Sutton Green in the Autumn

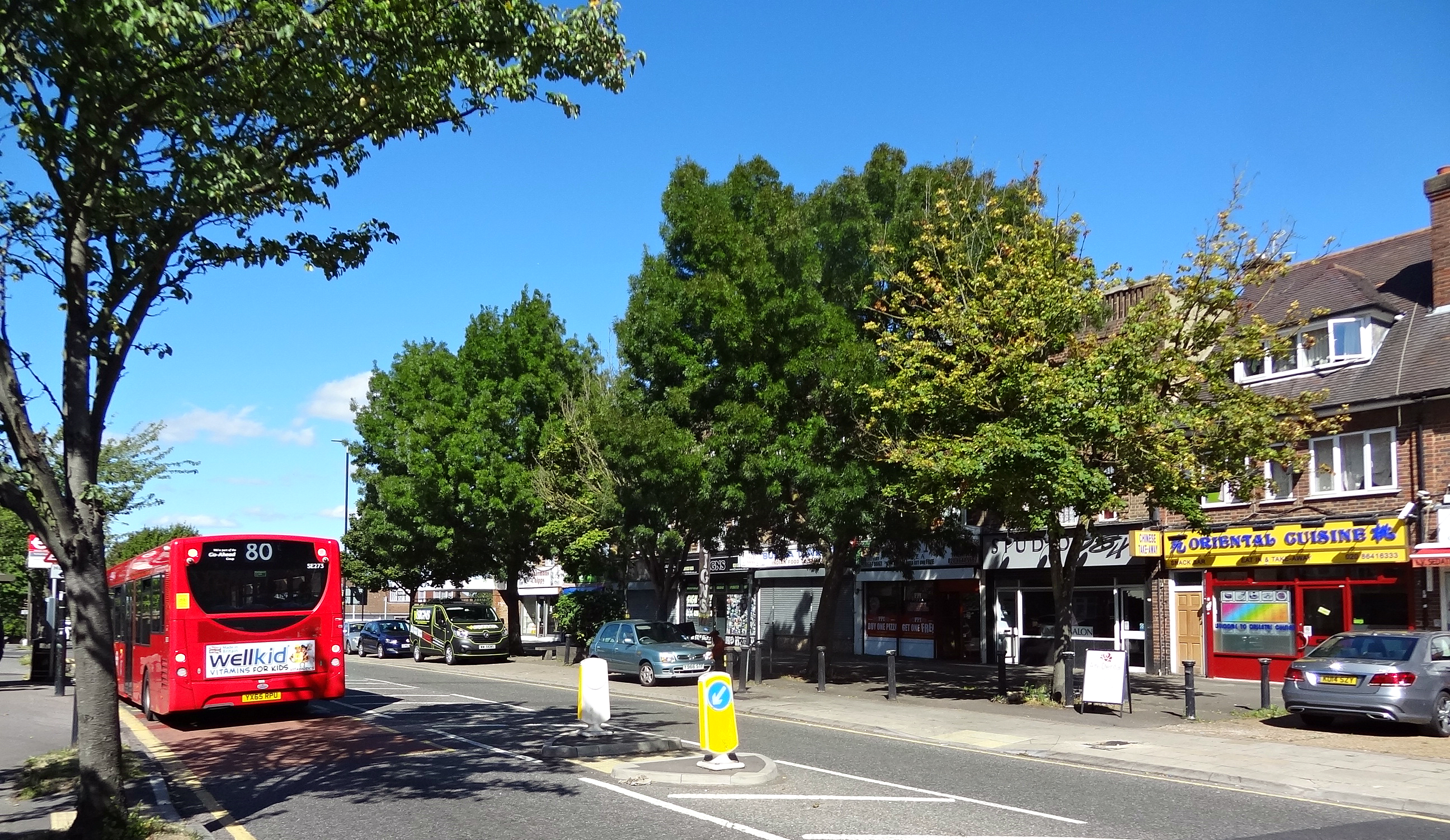
Sutton Common Road in 2016

Sutton Common is home to Glenthorne High School and two large recreation grounds, Sutton Common Recreation Ground and Reigate Avenue Recreation Ground (the latter also known locally as "The Daisy Field"), as well as part of the smaller Hamilton Avenue Recreation Ground bordering North Cheam; the Pyl Brook courses through, rising about half a kilometre further east near to Stayton Road and Pylbrook Road. Sutton Common Park, adjoining the Recreation Ground, contains a wet marsh and wild area for conserving and studying local biodiversity.

The neighbourhood is a mixture of residential, commercial and industrial uses. The majority residential area comprises blocks of purpose built flats, inter-War and mid-20th century terraced and semi-detached housing, and a few surviving Victorian and Edwardian properties, mostly along Sutton Common Road and close to Sutton Green: the exact border with Benhilton is unclear. Sutton Common Road runs along a ridge between the Pyl Brook and the East Pyl Brook and some of the streets on either side of the slope, particularly in the area east of the A217, are connected by stepped footways and steep, narrow alleys.

Clusters of local shops can be found around the railway station and further west along Sutton Common Road, next to Glenthorne High School and near to the roundabout with Ridge Road and Forest Road, as well as at Stonceot Hill. The main public house in the area is The Plough, now a Harvester, at the junction of Sutton Common Road and Reigate Avenue. The large Kimpton Park industrial area can be accessed from the A217 and adjoins a Tesco Extra superstore.

The local area is served by Sutton Common railway station and local bus S3, from Belmont to Malden Manor railway station along Pylbrook Road and Dibdin Road; 80, which runs from Downview prison in Belmont to Reynolds Close, Hackbridge via Stayton Road, Tonfield Road and Stonecot Hill; bus routes 470, which runs from Sutton Station along part of Sutton Common Road towards St Helier and Colliers Wood. The 93 bus also passes through Stonecot Hill, running from North Cheam to Putney Bridge via Morden South and Morden. Cycle route 208 from Angel Hill to Wimbledon traverses Rosehill Park West and the Reigate Avenue (A217)and Sutton Common Recreation Grounds.

The Sutton Life Centre for young people is located on Alcorn Close next to the cemetery. 1st North Sutton Scout Group have their headquarters at Stayton Road.

The football team Sutton Common Rovers represent the area at football and play at Gander Green Lane, which is also the home of Sutton United. On 7 September 2016, the club announced plans for a new £1 million ground, to be built on part of the Reigate Avenue Recreation Ground.

210 (Sutton) Transport Squadron of 151 Regiment RLC is based at Stonecot Hill.

== Nearby places ==
- Sutton
- Benhilton
- Rosehill
- St Helier
- North Cheam
- Lower Morden
- Morden Park
- Morden
