= Little Woodcote =

Coordinates: 51.337598°N 0.159567°W

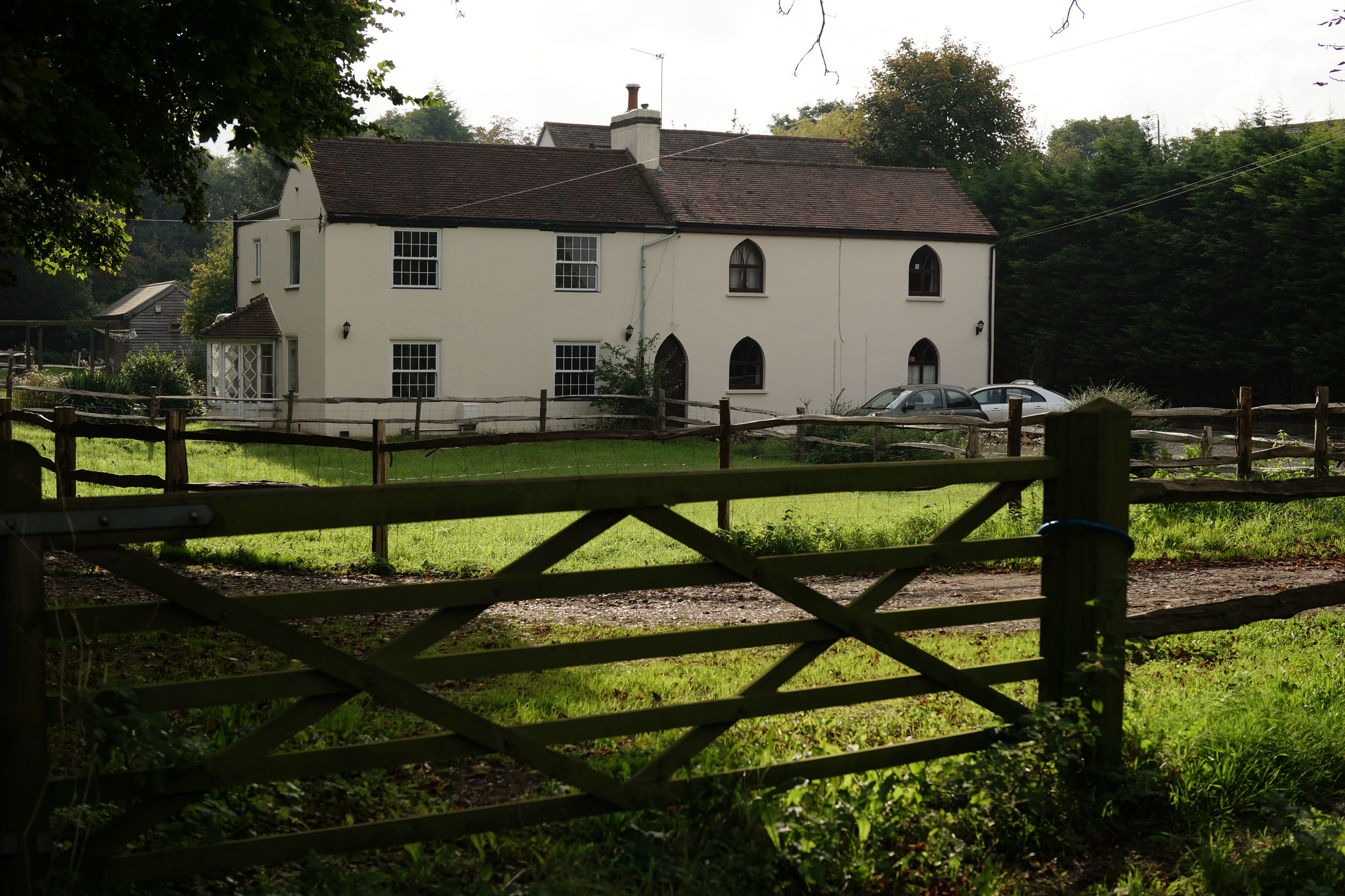
- A farmhouse at Little Woodcote

- Location within Greater London
- London borough: Sutton; Croydon
- Ceremonial county: Greater London
- Region: London
- Country: England
- Sovereign state: United Kingdom
- Post town: CARSHALTON
- Postcode district: SM5
- Post town: BANSTEAD
- Postcode district: SM7
- Dialling code: 020
- Police: Metropolitan
- Fire: London
- Ambulance: London
- UK Parliament: Carshalton & Wallington Croydon South
- London Assembly: Croydon and Sutton

Little Woodcote is an area in the boroughs of Sutton, and Croydon. It is located in the south-east of the borough south of Woodcote Green and Carshalton on the Hill. Nearby is Oaks Park. The area falls within the Carshalton South and Clockhouse Ward of Sutton Borough.

== Little Woodcote Estate ==
Little Woodcote Estate was created after the First World War to provide "Homes for Fit Heroes".

== Local Buses ==
Local bus routes include 127, 166, 463, S4 (operates on Mondays to Saturdays) and school bus routes 612, 627 and 633.
