= Glenthorne High School =

Location
- Sutton Common Road; Sutton, Greater London, SM3 9PS; England; 51.38077°N 0.20052°W

Information
- Type: Academy
- Motto: Achievement for all
- Established: 1933; 93 years ago
- Department for Education URN: 136914 Tables
- Ofsted: Reports
- Headteacher: Sarah Peacock
- Gender: Mixed
- Age: 11 to 18
- Enrolment: 1,758 as of November 2021
- Houses: Rollason, Turing, Morris, Seacole
- Website: www.glenthorne.sutton.sch.uk

Glenthorne High School is a non-selective mixed secondary school and sixth form located in the Sutton Common area of Sutton in the London Borough of Sutton, England.

== History ==
The school was first established in 1933 on Glastonbury Road in Sutton. It moved to the Sutton Common Road site in 1958, and at this time was called Sutton Common County Secondary Girls' School. The school changed its name to Glenthorne in 1982, and in 1993 it became coeducational. The school was converted to academy status in July 2011, and was previously a foundation school administered by Sutton London Borough Council. The schools continues to coordinate with Sutton London Borough Council for admissions.

== Academics ==
Glenthorne High School offers GCSEs, BTECs, OCR Nationals and vocational courses as programmes of study for pupils, while students in the sixth form have the option to study a range of A Levels and further BTECs. The school specialises in the arts and has dedicated resources and facilities to support the specialism.

The school librarian is Lucas Maxwell, who was named Librarian of the Year in 2017 by the School Library Association. Maxwell was also awarded a British Empire Medal in 2024 for his services to education.

== Documentary ==
The school and twenty-four of its Year 7 students were featured in the Channel 4 documentary The School That Tried To End Racism. The 11 and 12 year olds were aided to uncover and eradicate hidden racial biases as well as expand their knowledge of racism and white privilege through various social experiments. The documentary won the 2021 British Academy of Film and Television (BAFTA) Award for Reality and Constructed Factual.
