= Woodcote Green =

Coordinates: 51.348475°N 0.146687°W

- Location within Greater London
- London borough: Sutton
- Ceremonial county: Greater London
- Region: London
- Country: England
- Sovereign state: United Kingdom
- Postcode district: SM6
- Post town: Wallington
- Dialling code: 020
- Police: Metropolitan
- Fire: London
- Ambulance: London
- UK Parliament: Carshalton & Wallington
- London Assembly: Croydon and Sutton

Woodcote Green is an area in the London Borough of Sutton, located in the south-east of the borough south of Wallington. At the 2011 Census the population of the area was included in the Beddington South ward of Sutton Council.
