= Manor Park, Sutton =

Park in Sutton, London

Manor Park
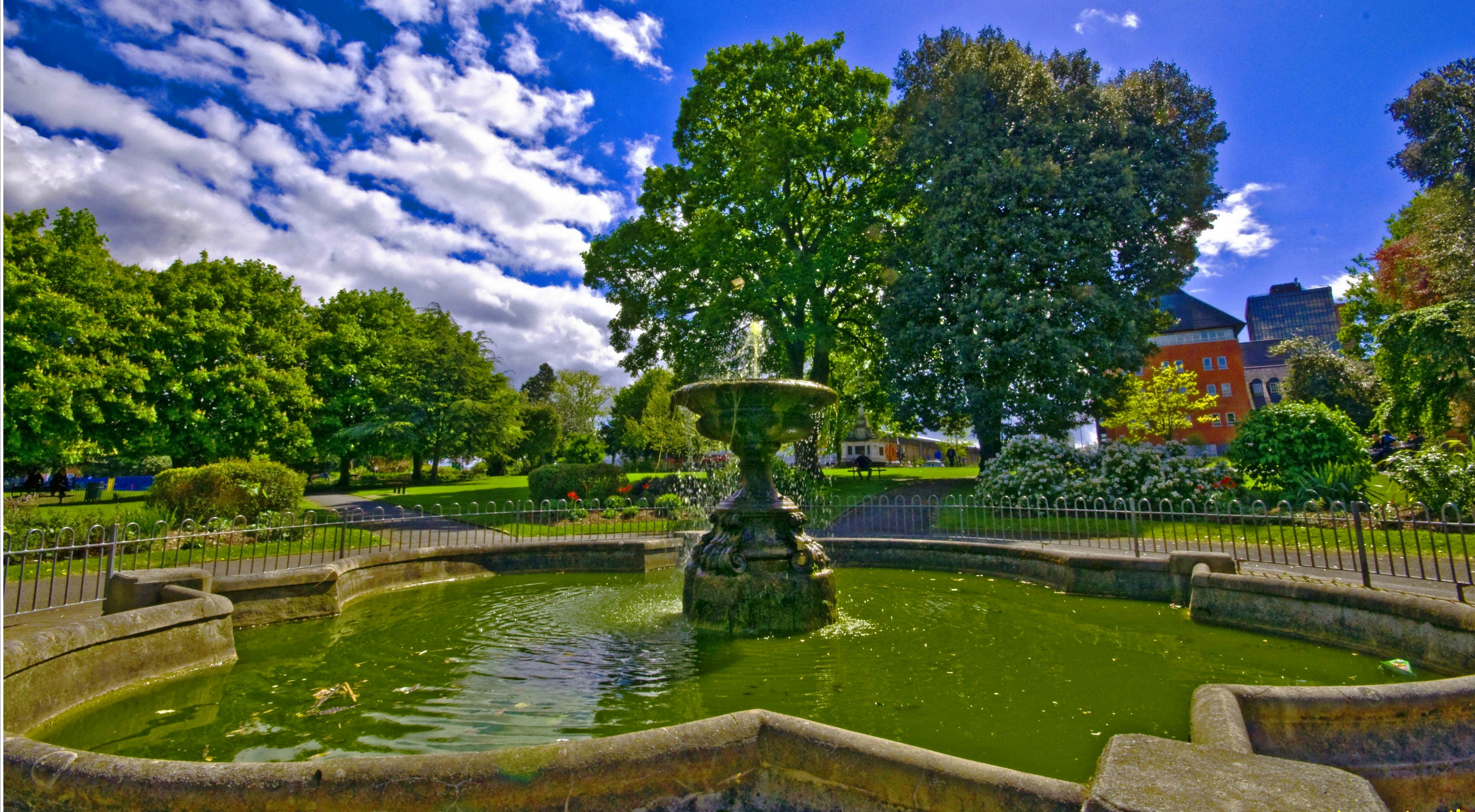
- Fountain in the centre of Manor Park

- Location within Greater London
- Type: Public park
- Location: Sutton, London Borough of Sutton, England
- Coordinates: 51°21′47″N 0°11′24″W
- Area: 2.33 hectares (5.8 acres)
- Created: 1914
- Operator: London Borough of Sutton
- Status: Open year round

Manor Park is a public park in the town of Sutton in Greater London. It was created in 1914 on a site in the town centre, opposite the police station. Its grounds include the Sutton War Memorial, which was added in 1921. It is bounded by Throwley Way to the west; Carshalton Road to the south; Manor Park Road to the east, and Greyhound Road to the north. Sutton High Street runs parallel to Throwley Way, fifty yards to the west.

In 2010 its new café of straw-bale construction was London's first environmentally friendly building to use this building method.

== History ==
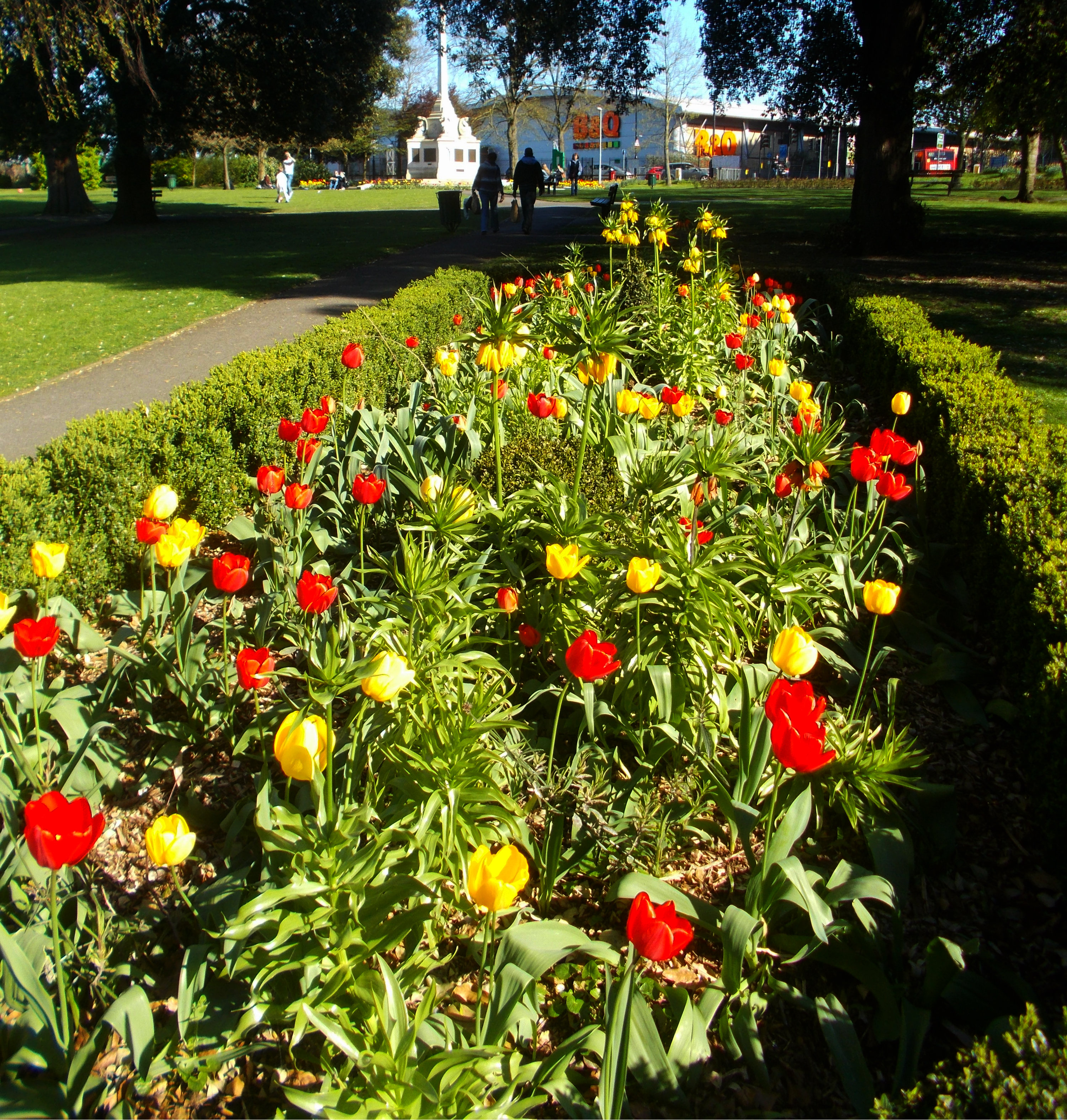
Flower bed of tulips in Manor Park

Manor Park occupies the former grounds of four large houses, three in Carshalton Road, and one in Manor Park Road, which was called Manor Park House. This house passed to the then Sutton Urban District Council (SUDC) in 1914, who created the park from its grounds, which had at the time become overgrown. The changeover was achieved without major alteration.

The park was opened by the Chairman of the SUDC on 25 May 1914. It was progressively expanded in size following the acquisition of further houses in 1921, 1924 and 1931.

=== Sutton War Memorial ===
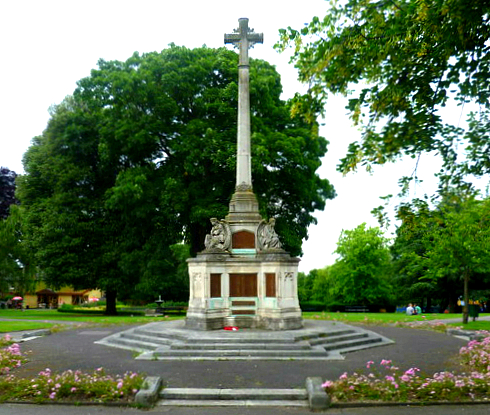
Sutton War Memorial

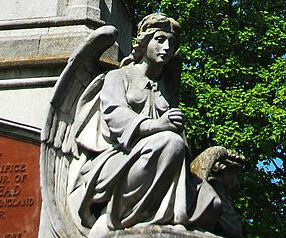
An angel on the memorial

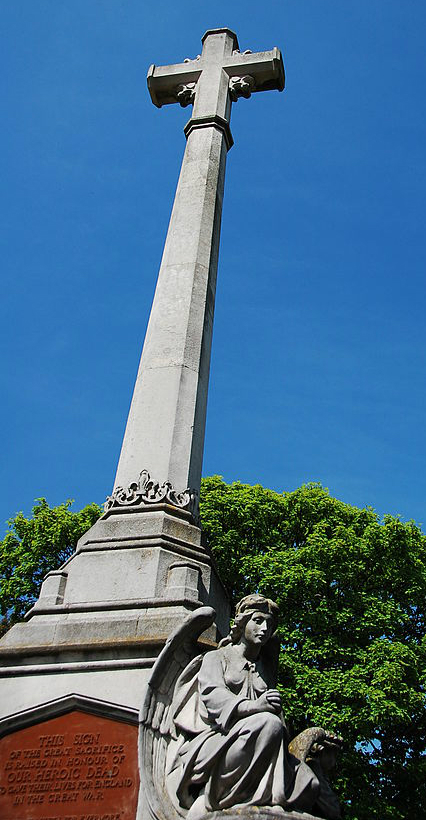
Sutton War Memorial

Manor park is also the site of the Sutton War Memorial. In 1921 the War Memorial Committee bought two houses adjacent to the park, and erected the war memorial in their place. Responsibility for maintaining the grounds of the memorial was taken on by the Council. The memorial was unveiled at a service in June 1921 by Sir Ralph Forster, a wealthy local resident whose son died in the war. It was designed by the architect JSW Burmester who lived in Grange Road, Sutton. The memorial, in portland stone, consists of a large ornamental cross on a plinth.

524 men who died in the First World War are commemorated on the memorial. As well as the plaques containing names of the fallen, it has four panels, one containing an inscription, and the other three containing the emblems representing the Army, Navy and Royal Air Force. There are also four angels on the plinth overlooking the park. The inscription reads:

This sign of the great sacrifice is raised in honour of OUR HEROIC DEAD, who gave their lives for England in the Great War. Their name liveth for evermore.

=== Water fountain ===
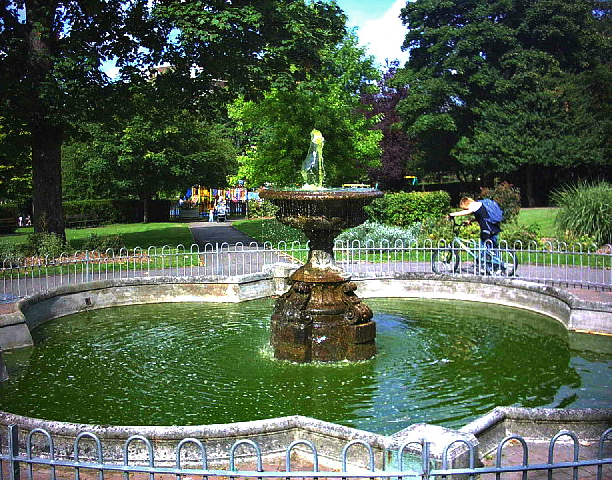
The fountain in Manor Park (summer)

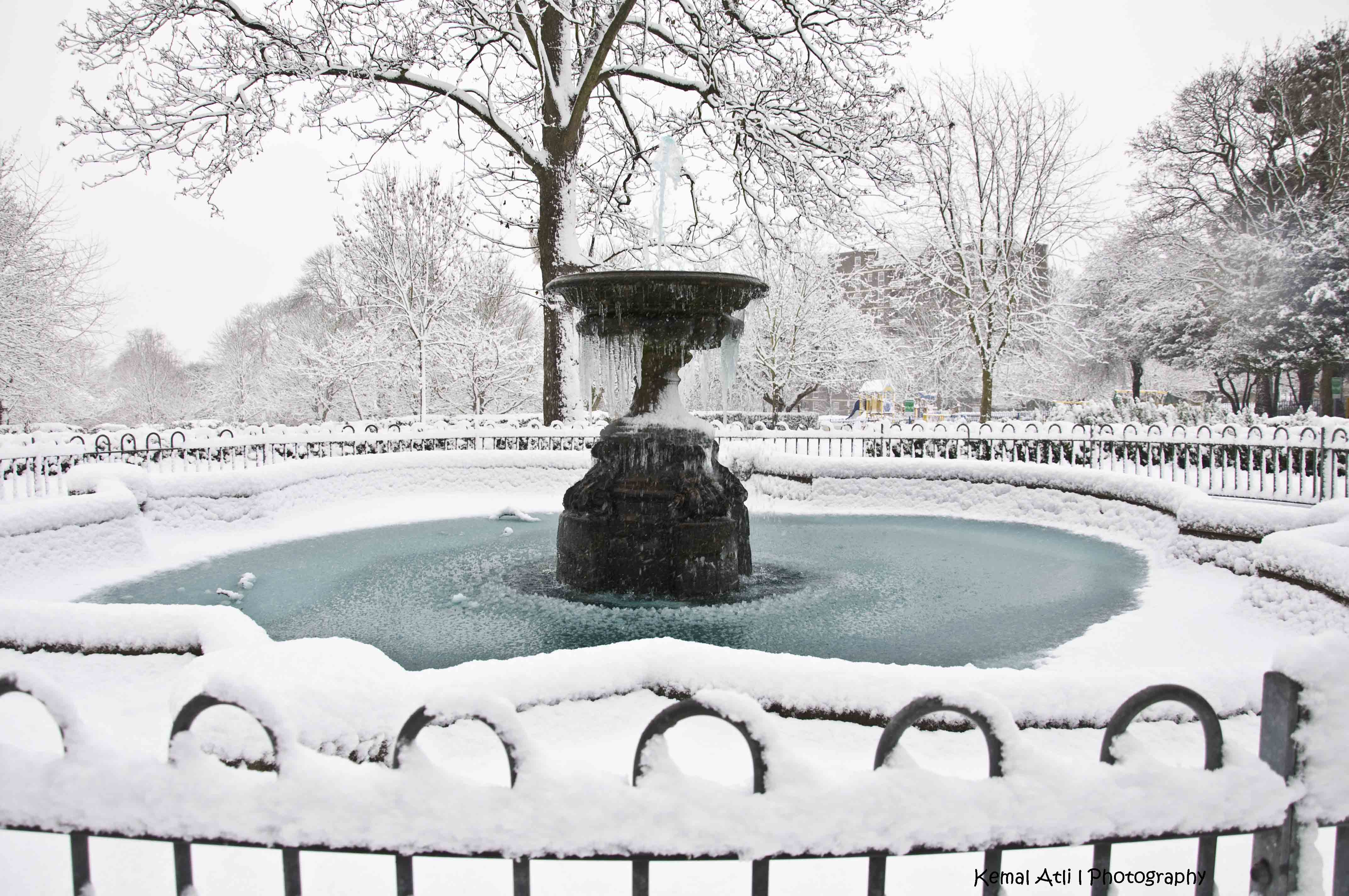
The fountain in Manor Park (winter)

The park's iconic water fountain was installed in 1924 to 1925, when it was donated by the chairman of the SUDC, Councillor Charles Yates. This was one of a series of donations made to the park from people in the locality. A plaque on the pool surround gives recognition to this donation.

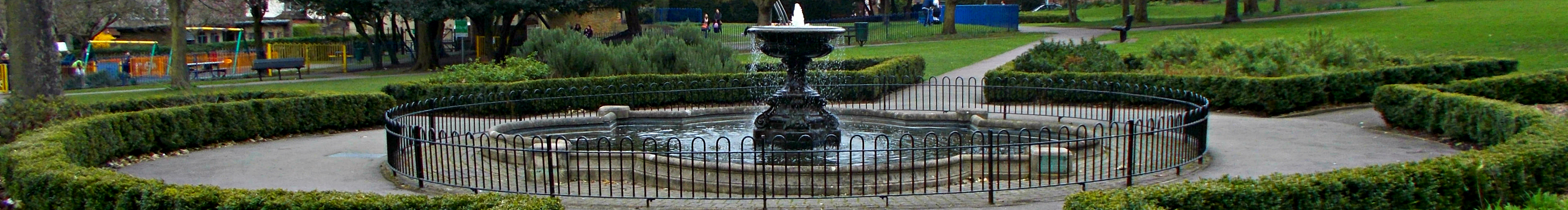
Manor Park fountain

== Straw-bale café ==
The current Manor Park Café opened in October 2010. This eco-friendly, thirty-seat café has a range of environmental features, including its straw-bale construction. It was erected using UK produced straw-bales and natural sustainable materials, giving the building a potential lifespan of over 200 years. It was designed by Amazonails Architectura designers, and constructed by a mixed team of builders. It was London's first energy-efficient building to use this method of construction.
