= SM postcode area =

Postcode area within the United Kingdom

Sutton
- Postcode area
- Coordinates: 51.363°N 0.186°W
- Country: United Kingdom
- Postcode area: SM
- Postcode area name: Sutton
- Post towns: 5
- Postcode districts: 7
- Postcode sectors: 29
- Postcodes (live): 4,350
- Postcodes (total): 6,638
- Statistics as at May 2020

The SM postcode area, also known as the Sutton & Morden postcode area, is a group of seven postcode districts in England, within five post towns. These cover part of south-west London, as well as a small part of north-east Surrey.

The main sorting office is in Sutton. Outgoing mail is sorted at Croydon Mail Centre in CR postcode area.

The area includes almost all of the London Borough of Sutton. Most of SM4 covers the southern part of the London Borough of Merton (emulates Morden). The southern bulk of SM7 and parts of SM2 respectively cover Banstead and adjoining Cuddington Croft (also called Howell Hill) and the Vale of Holmesdale village-named detached-home streets in (East) Ewell all of which will be in East Surrey when its Council first takes effect, from April 2027. This complex part of East Ewell lies in Cuddington, Surrey, a dated and largely unknown place name locally.

== Coverage ==
The approximate coverage of the postcode districts:

Postcode district	Post town	Coverage	Local authority area(s)
SM1	SUTTON	Sutton, Rosehill, Parts of The Wrythe and Carshalton, Benhilton and Erskine Village, the eastern part of Sutton Common	L.B. of Sutton
SM2	SUTTON	Belmont, South Sutton, South Cheam, East Ewell (eastern half of)	L.B. of Sutton / Epsom and Ewell / Reigate and Banstead
SM3	SUTTON	The western part of Sutton Common, North Cheam, Cheam village, Stonecot Hill	L.B. of Sutton / Epsom and Ewell
SM4	MORDEN	Morden, Morden Park, Lower Morden, Cannon Hill, St. Helier (North), Rosehill	L.B.s of Merton & Sutton
SM5	CARSHALTON	Carshalton, Carshalton Beeches, Carshalton on the Hill, The Wrythe, Rosehill, St. Helier (South), Little Woodcote	L.B. of Sutton
SM6	WALLINGTON	Wallington, Beddington, Hackbridge, Roundshaw	L.B. of Sutton
SM7	BANSTEAD	Banstead (including Nork), Woodmansterne,	Reigate and Banstead, L.B. of Sutton

== Map ==
SM postcode area map, showing postcode districts in red and post towns in grey text, with links to nearby CR, KT and SW postcode areas.

== See also ==
- Postcode Address File
- List of postcode areas in the United Kingdom
