= Mobile Life Centre =

Swedish research institute

- Established: April 2007
- Research type: Ubiquitous computing, Human-Computer Interaction
- Location: Kista, Sweden
- Affiliations: Stockholm University, SICS
- Website: Official Website

The Mobile Life Centre at Stockholm University in Kista, Sweden, conducts research in mobile services and ubiquitous computing. The centre focuses on researching consumer-oriented mobile and ubiquitous services, spanning all areas from entertainment and socialisation to work and society. The centre joins forces with local research organisations such as SICS and The Interactive Institute. It has major partners from the IT and telecom industries, including Ericsson Research, TeliaSonera, Sony Ericsson, and Microsoft Research. Partnerships in the public sector include Stockholm Municipality and Kista Science City. The Mobile Life Centre is one of the 19 VINN Excellence Centres selected by Vinnova (the Swedish Government Agency for Innovation Systems).

== Funding ==
The centre received funding from Vinnova on a 10-year grant, beginning in 2007.

== See also ==
- List of ubiquitous computing research centers
- Mobile Interaction
