= Roundshaw Downs =

Natural area in London, England

Coordinates: 51.350°N 0.126°W

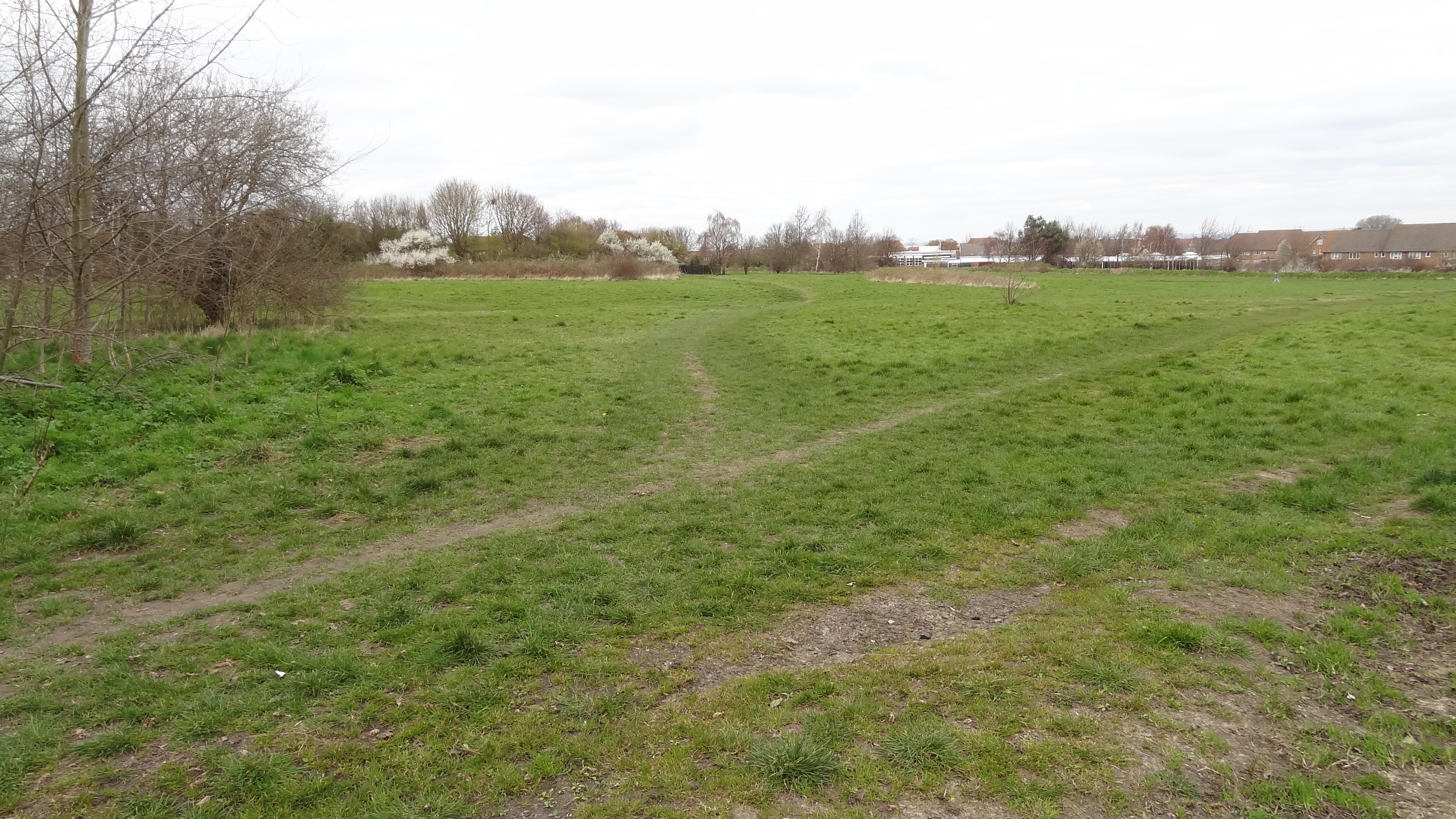
Grassland

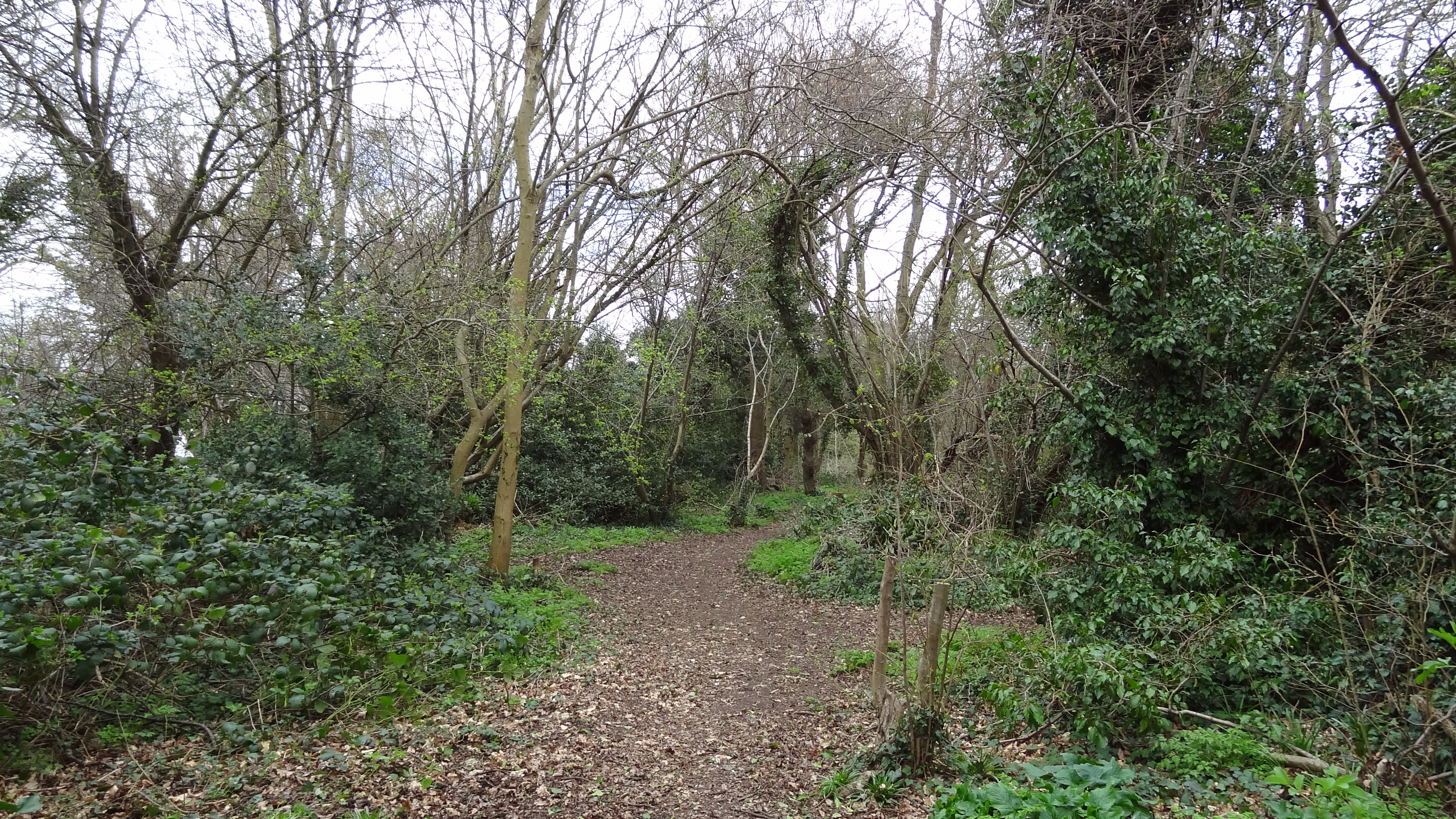
Woodland

Roundshaw Downs is a 52.7-hectare (130-acre) Site of Metropolitan Importance for Nature Conservation Roundshaw in the London Boroughs of Sutton and Croydon. An area of 19.6 hectares in Sutton is also a local nature reserve. In the nineteenth century the area was farmland, and in the first half of the twentieth it was Croydon Airport.

Most of the site is a mixture of chalk and neutral grassland. Areas of unimproved chalk grassland have species typical of this habitat such as common quaking grass, wild carrot and bird's-foot-trefoil. A grassland flower species is greater yellow rattle, which is nationally protected, and Sutton and Croydon are its national strongholds. The wasp spider Argiope bruennichi builds web in the grasslands. Birds include kestrels and skylarks. the latter a Red List species due to its sharp decline in Britain.

The site also has areas of woodland, which have great spotted woodpeckers, blackcap and chiffchaff. There are common whitethroats in scrub areas.

There is access from Plough Lane.
