= The Life Centre =

Special school in Trinidad and Tobago

The Life Centre is a special school located in Digeo Martin in Trinidad and Tobago. It caters to pupils with low functioning autism. The director is Suzy Deverteuil.
