= Sutton Life Centre =

Community centre in London, England

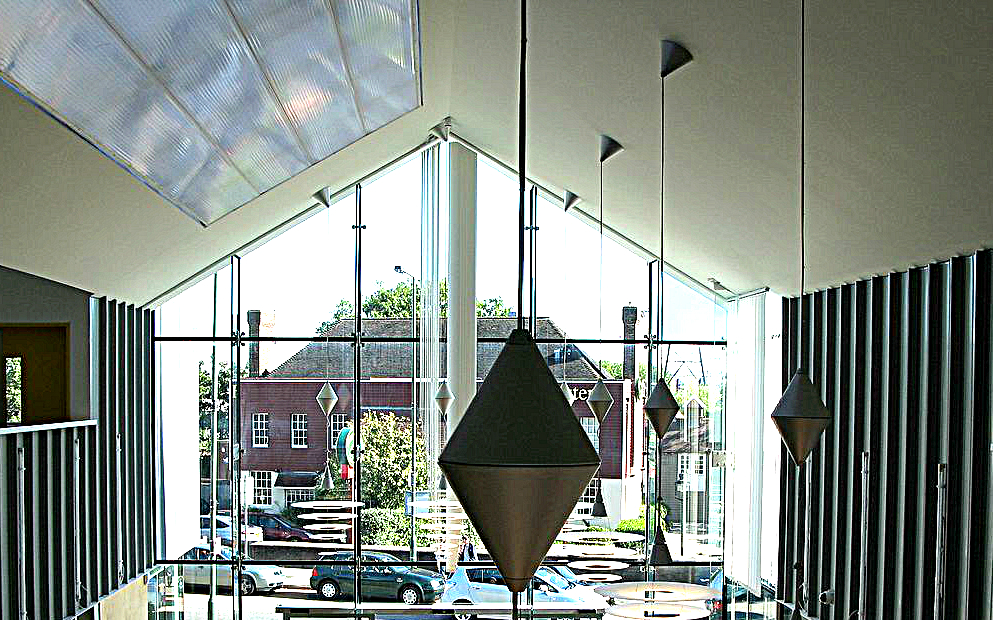
- Interior of the Sutton Life Centre
- Interactive map of the Sutton Life Centre area

General information
- Location: Sutton, Greater London, 24 Alcorn Close, Sutton, SM3 9PX, England
- Coordinates: 51°22′44″N 0°12′6″W
- Opened: 27 October 2010
- Cost: £8 million
- Client: London Borough of Sutton

Design and construction
- Architecture firm: Curl la Tourelle Architects

Website
- http://www.suttonlifecentre.org

The Sutton Life Centre is a community centre in Sutton, South London. It is an £8 million facility that uses audiovisual equipment to make young people more "street smart" and better able to deal with the dangers and risks they face in life. It was opened on 27 October 2010 by the then Deputy Prime Minister Nick Clegg.

== Features ==
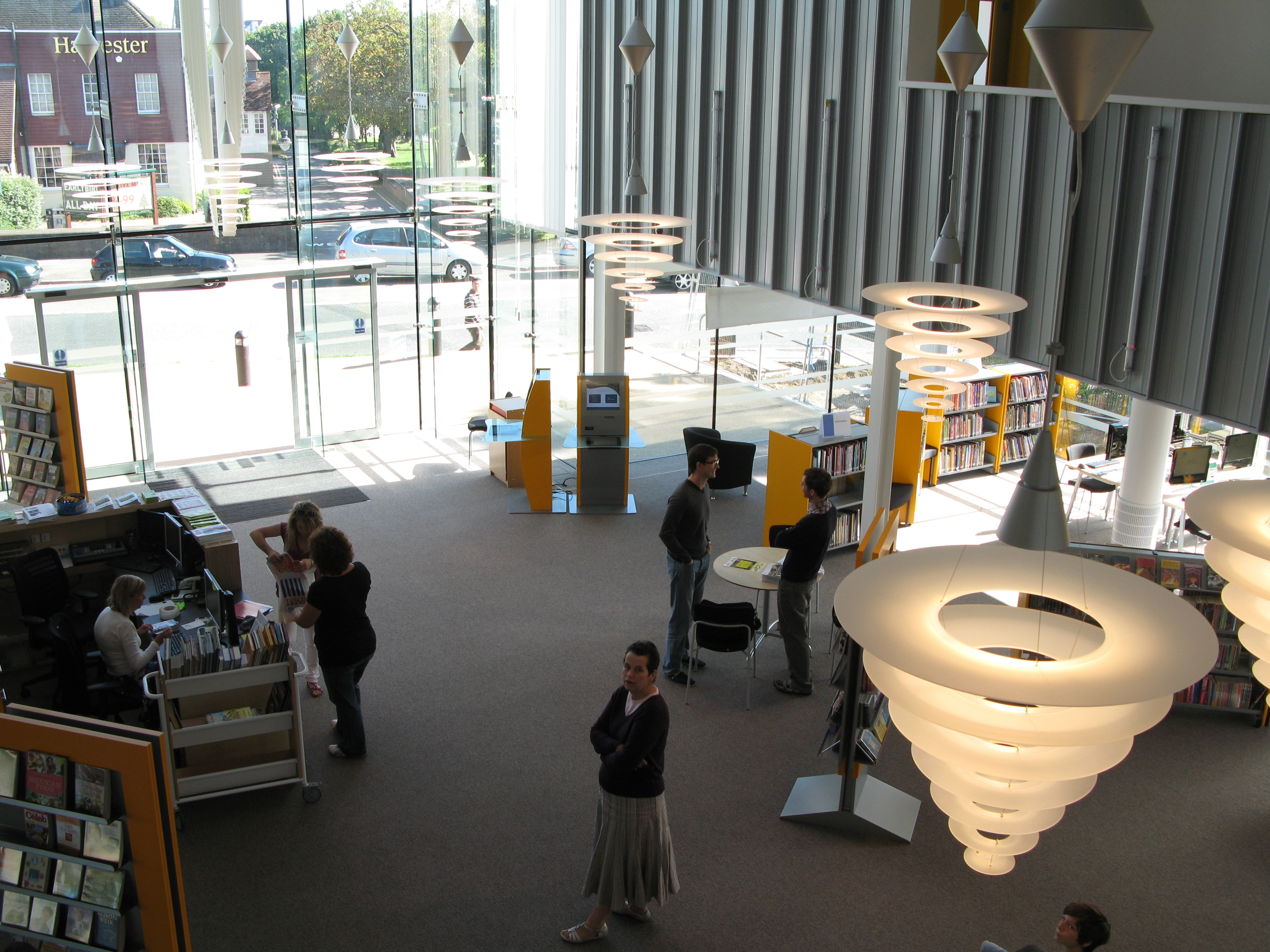
Building interior

Sutton Life Centre is a community and education centre in South London, which houses a blend of facilities under one roof, including an educational experience, a library, café, climbing wall, eco garden, sports pitch, and youth club. There are a number of spaces which are available to hire including meeting rooms, events spaces and an IT suite equipped with 12 Apple Mac computers.

The library is designed to be more like a High Street bookshop than a traditional library. It also offers longer opening hours and a self-service facility for borrowing books.

The centre's educational facilities support PSHE (Personal, Social, Health and Economic) studies for pupils in Key Stages 2 and 3. They provide an immersive virtual world through the use of surround sound, lighting effects and interactive features. Pupils are taught about topics such as citizenship, personal safety and the environment. They will experience a range of real-life scenarios which help young people to deal with them in the outside world.

== The Life Skills Zone ==
The Life Skills Zone is divided into four distinct areas.

The Street Experience has a film set feel, and is designed to look like a real street, complete with shop facades. Topics covered include bullying, alcohol, smoking, drugs, peer pressure, knife crime and gang culture.

The Transport Experience is designed to look like a railway station, and covers topics to do with public transport, including platform safety, respecting others, robbery, personal safety, littering and graffiti.

The Home Experience is a fully fitted apartment with four rooms. Pupils will make their way through a kitchen, dining room, living room and bedroom to learn about keeping safe in the home. Topics covered include nutrition, domestic violence, fire safety, cyberbullying and internet safety.

The Virtual Experience is a 360° white room theatre which delivers fully immersive videos about urban hazards and the environment. Topics covered include exploring derelict buildings, trespassing on the railway, arson, waste, recycling, climate change and energy efficiency.

== Safety Centre Alliance ==
Sutton Life Centre is a member of the Safety Centre Alliance which was designed as a forum to help support permanent UK safety centres through development and networking between members. There are a number of safety centres across the UK which deliver educational experiences on safety to children.

== Energy Efficiency ==
Renewable energy on site provides for half of the building's requirement, and it was given an award of excellence by BREEAM for its use of sustainable energy. The centre was included in the 2014 Open House London programme.

== Awards ==
The centre was instrumental in the Safer Sutton Partnership Service, a joint venture between the London Borough of Sutton and the Metropolitan Police, winning the national Safer Community Award from the Suzy Lamplugh Trust in 2010. Sarah Haddon of the Trust said:

The Life Skills Zone of the centre has particular emphasis on improving personal safety, especially for young people. We see tremendous value in this resource and applaud Sutton Borough Council for its imaginative approach to the issues.
