= Rosehill, London =

Coordinates: 51.3824°N 0.1916°W

Rosehill
- Location within Greater London
- OS grid reference: TQ2666
- London borough: Sutton
- Ceremonial county: Greater London
- Region: London
- Country: England
- Sovereign state: United Kingdom
- Post town: SUTTON
- Postcode district: SM1
- Post town: MORDEN
- Postcode district: SM4
- Post town: CARSHALTON
- Postcode district: SM5
- Dialling code: 020
- Police: Metropolitan
- Fire: London
- Ambulance: London
- UK Parliament: Carshalton & Wallington Sutton and Cheam
- London Assembly: Croydon and Sutton

Rosehill is a suburb of Sutton in South London, England. It lends its name to the Rose Hill roundabout, which connects the A217, A297 and B278. It is 9 miles (14+1/2 km) southwest of Charing Cross. At the 2011 Census the population of the suburb was included in the Sutton North ward of the London Borough of Sutton.

The area surrounding Rosehill is notably green: there are two large green spaces to the southeast and southwest, Rosehill Park East and Rosehill Park West, the latter housing the Sutton Tennis Academy; a park to the west, Thomas Wall Park, named after the local benefactor; and a park to the east opposite St Helier Hospital, called the St. Helier Open Space. It is also residential in character, with two large sets of flats immediately north and south of the roundabout. The northern block of flats is in an Art Deco style, and dates from the 1930s; the southern development was built by Bellway Homes and marketed as luxury apartments circa 2003.

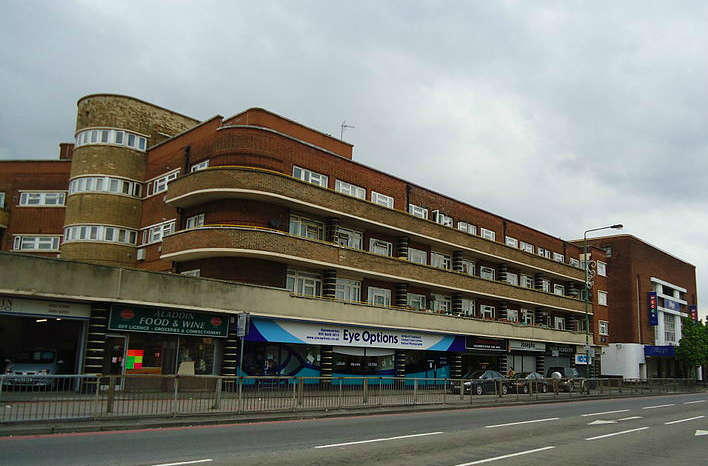
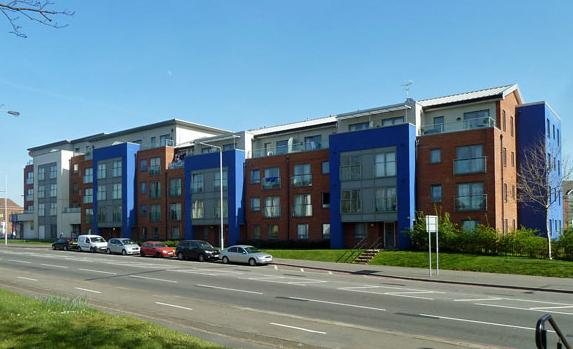
The two sets of flats.

== History ==
In early Surrey, an enclosure was usually a farm, and Oldfields Farm was located on the southern slope of Rosehill; it was a "south" enclosure because it lay south of the Roman road Stane Street, which is now the modern A24. It was this farm which lends itself to the origin of the name Sutton, originally Sudtone, formed from Old English 'sūth' and 'tūn', meaning "the south enclosure". It appears in a survey of 1496 as "Eldeseldes" and Rose Hill as Fern Hill. Oldfields Farm and another farm to the north, Rosehill Farm (later Rose Hill House), survived until after the First World War when both were demolished to make way for the St. Helier estate.

Rosehill was the site of Sutton's northernmost toll-house and gate on the London to Brighton turnpike road from 1758 until 1882. A milestone dating from 1745 and inscribed "Royal Exchange XI Miles. Whitehall X Miles.", originally built to mark the route from London to Banstead Downs, can be found on the southern slope of Rose Hill on the border with Benhilton.

== Economy ==
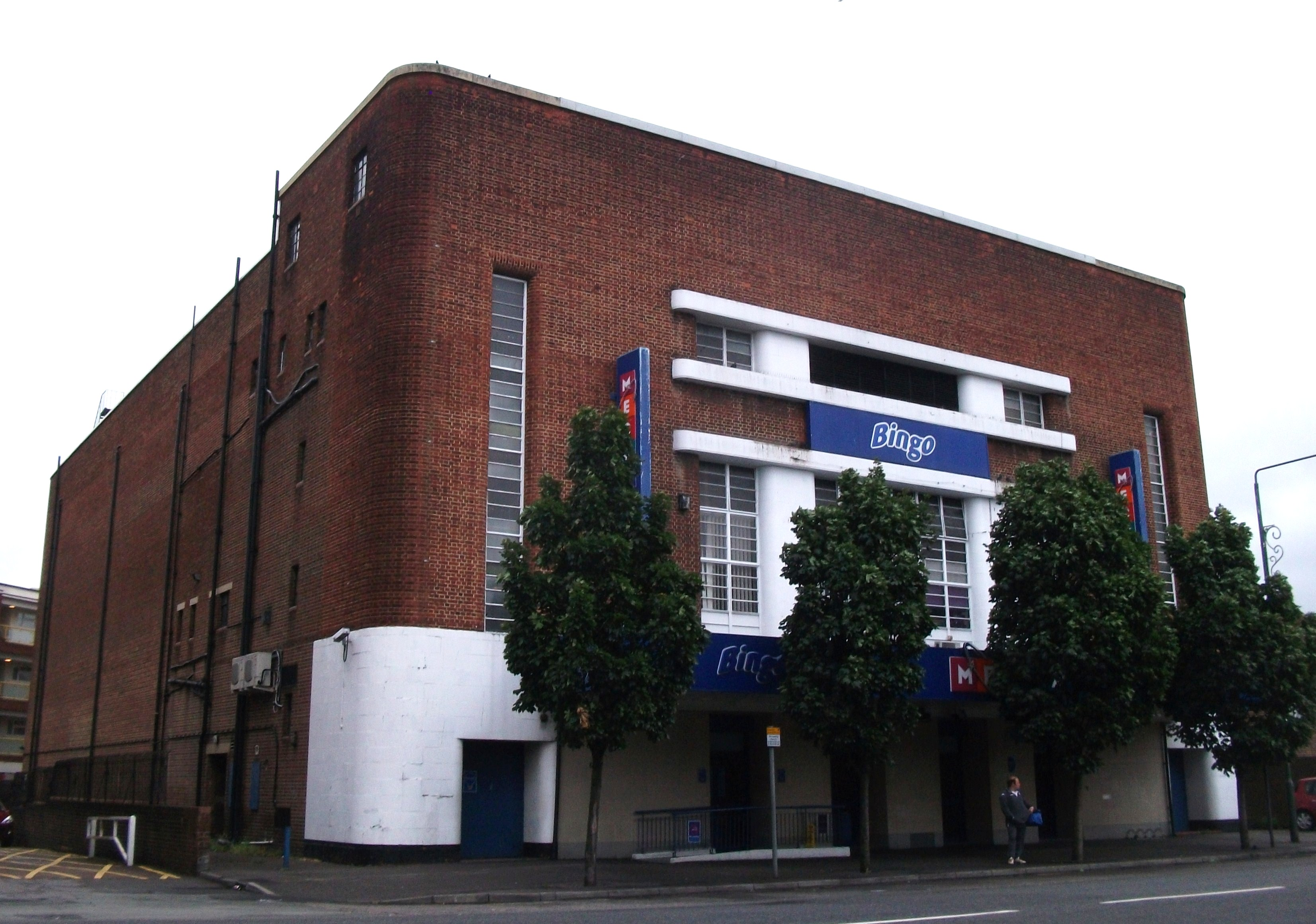
The Grade II listed art deco former Gaumont Cinema

Rosehill's small retail area contains a range of shops; there is a focus on food, in the form of both restaurants and supermarkets. The parade of shops known as "The Market" stands on its own in the southern block of flats. A Grade II listed Mecca Bingo hall stands adjacent to the northern block, and is a good surviving example of a 1930s art deco former cinema. The Market also includes a new Lidl supermarket.

== Transport ==
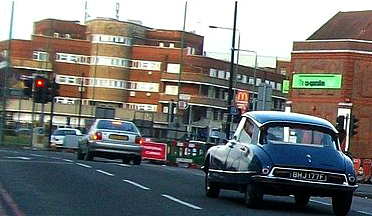
Traffic approaching the main roundabout

Rosehill is well served by public transport, being served by bus routes 151, 154, 157, 164, 280, S2 and N44; S1 is available from St Helier Hospital.

Rosehill does not have its own named railway station, but St Helier railway station and Sutton Common railway station are within walking distance, and Morden tube station and Sutton railway station are easily accessible by bus.
