= Sutton Ecology Centre Grounds =

Nature reserve in Carshalton, London, England

Coordinates: 51.3661°N 0.1656°W

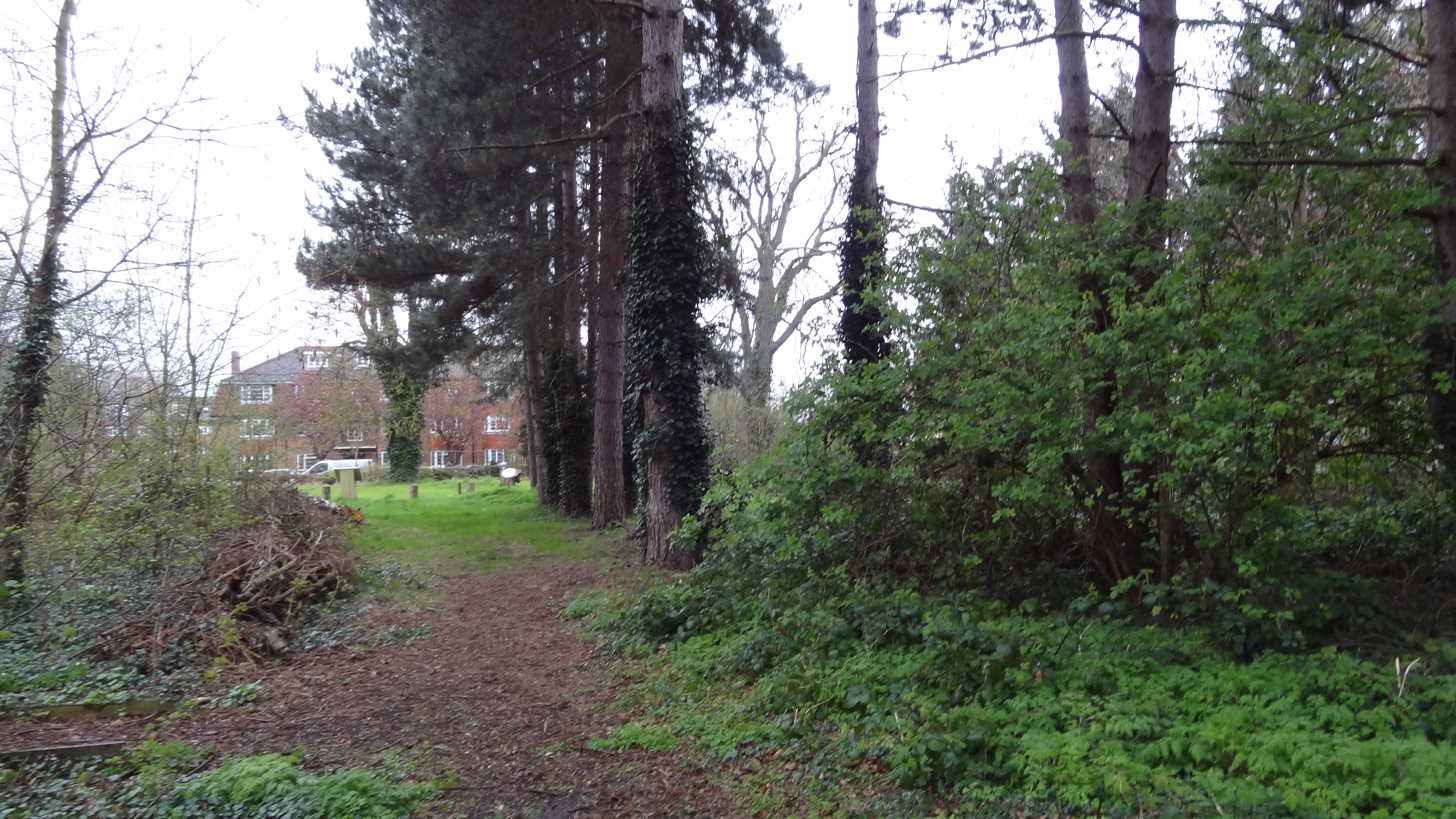

Sutton Ecology Centre Grounds is a 1.3 hectare Local Nature Reserve and Site of Borough Importance for Nature Conservation, Grade 1, in Carshalton in the London Borough of Sutton. It is owned by Sutton Council and managed by the Council together with the Friends of Sutton Ecology Centre.

The area was recorded as an orchard called Cook's Orchard from 1590. In the eighteenth century it was the kitchen garden for Stone Court, which was demolished in about 1800. The grounds also include The Old Rectory, built in the early eighteenth century. The Ecology Centre opened in 1989.

Habitats include ponds, woodland, meadows, marshlands. There are also small demonstration gardens. In the south is the old course of the River Wandle, which is now dry most of the time, but still has yellow flag iris. Margaret's Pool has a number of species of dragonfly and damselfly, and the trees surrounding it are sycamore and ash.

There is access from Festival Walk.
