= Austenasia =

Micronation in the United Kingdom

Coordinates: 51°22′53.2″N 0°10′18.5″W

Empire of Austenasia
- Micronation (unrecognized entity)
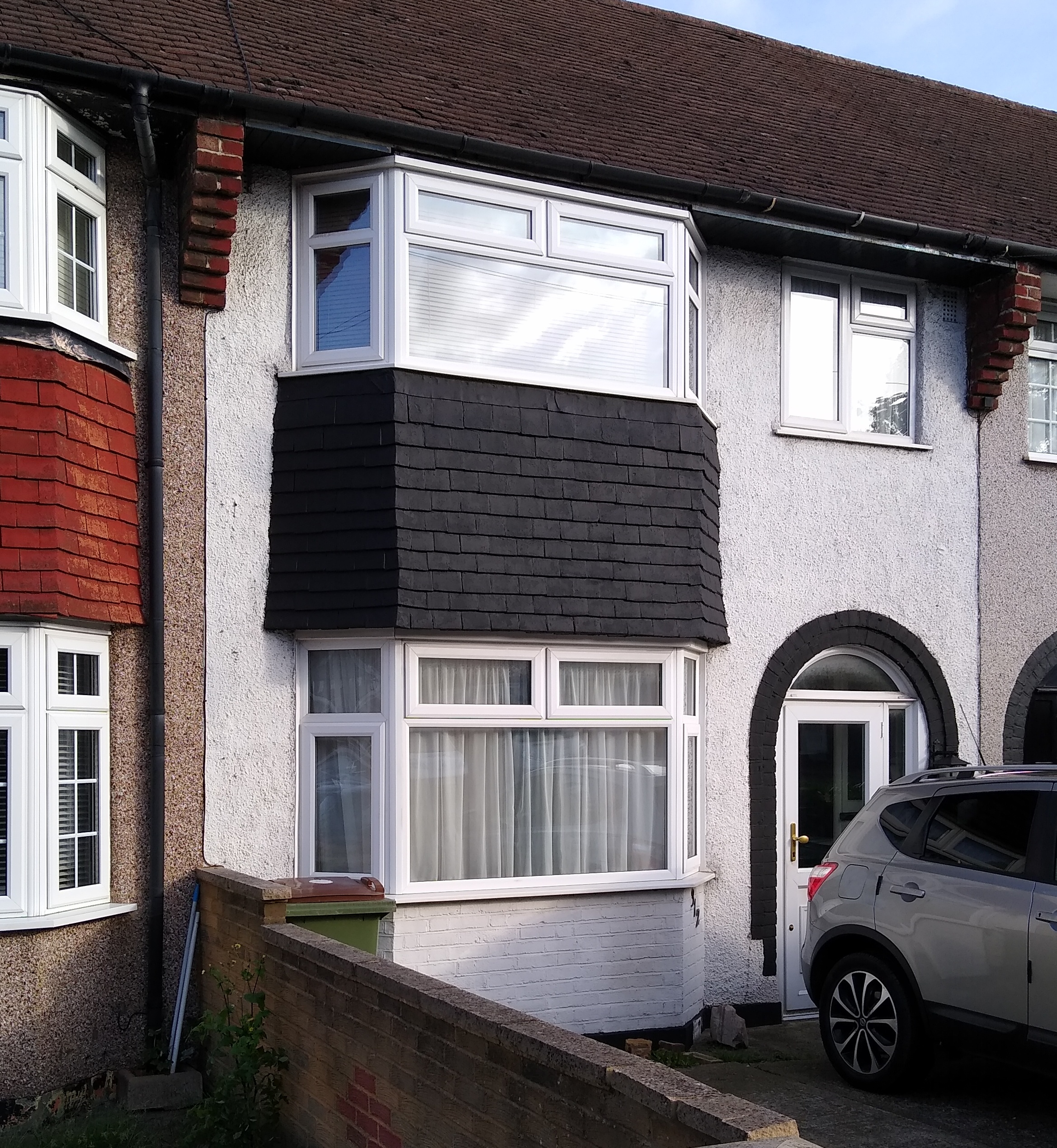
- Wrythe, the capital of Austenasia

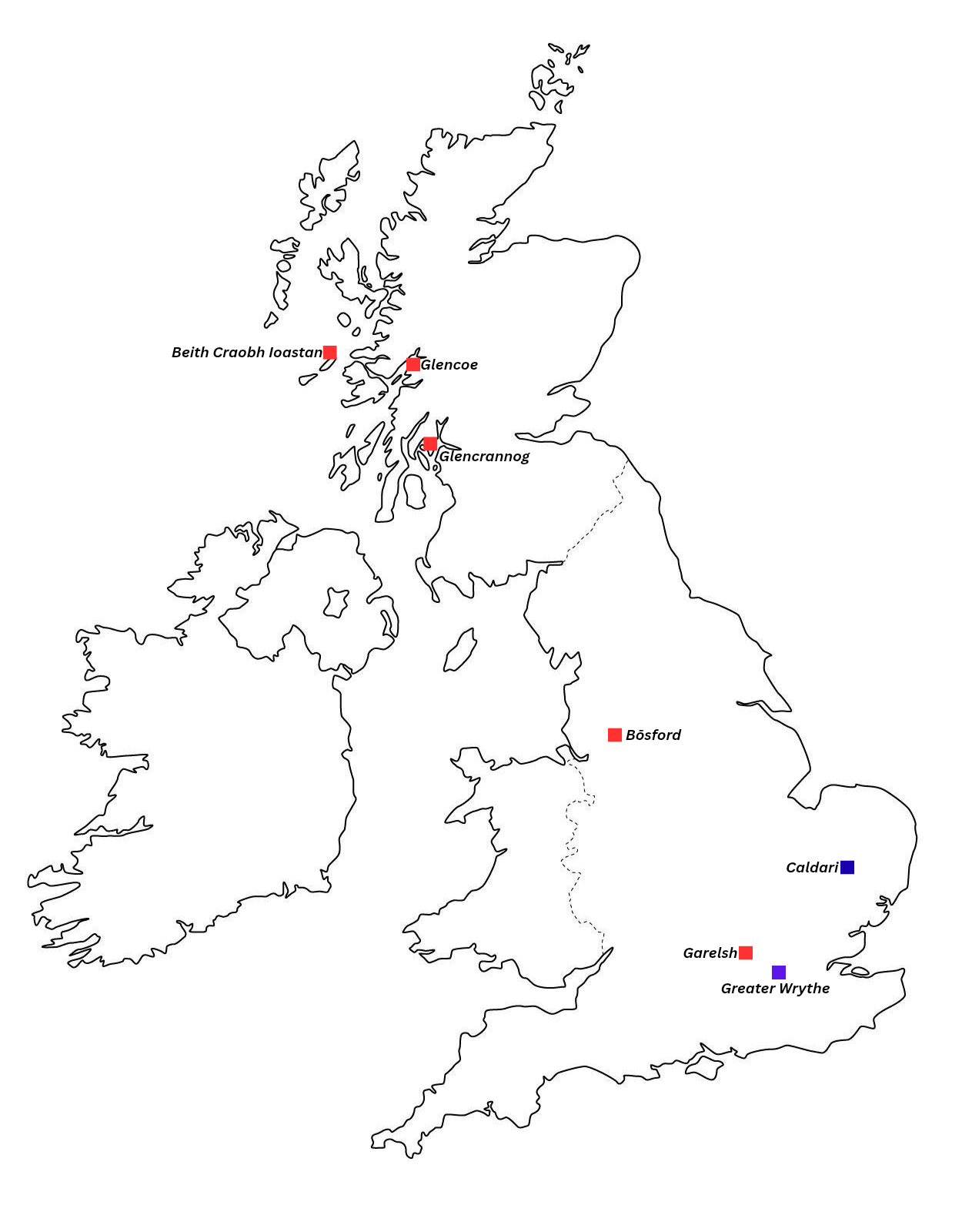
- British claims of Austenasia
- Claimed by: Jonathan and Terry Austen
- Dates claimed: 20 September 2008–present
- Website austenasia.org

The Empire of Austenasia is a micronation founded in 2008 in the United Kingdom. Operating under a constitutional monarchy, it consists of dozens of properties that have declared themselves independent under the leadership of a house in the London Borough of Sutton.

Drawing from the medieval idea of Translatio imperii, Austenasia claims to be a successor of the Roman Empire (specifically its later Christian phase) and has increasingly adopted Roman-themed elements such as Consuls and a Senate. Christianity was declared Austenasia's official religion in 2017.

== History ==
Austenasia was founded on 20 September 2008 by Jonathan Austen (born 1994), a student, and his father, Terry Austen (born 1961), a security guard turned gardener. After sending a declaration of independence for their house in Carshalton to their local Member of Parliament, Tom Brake, Terry was named Emperor and Jonathan was named Prime Minister. Terry abdicated in February 2010, and was succeeded by Emperor Esmond III, who, after a "civil war" and various internal disputes, was replaced by a new leader, Declan MacDonagh, in December of that year. Having initially received no reply to their declaration of independence, Jonathan met with Tom Brake MP in May 2011, who contacted Foreign Secretary William Hague to enquire on Jonathan's behalf about the criteria by which the UK recognises new states.

Flag of Austenasia.

Jonathan then became emperor after Declan abdicated in January 2013 for personal reasons, and began a program of expansion, which has seen people from across the world join the micronation by claiming properties which they live in or regularly visit. In April 2024, Jonathan withdrew from a leadership position, handing over responsibility for running the micronation to a Prince Regent, Aggelos I.

The micronation has been featured in several local and international publications, and has a certain amount of fame in Carshalton as a local "quirk". The micronation produced and sold commemorative coins in 2018 to celebrate its tenth anniversary.

== Geography ==
Austenasia claims several properties around the world, variously classified as "cities", "towns", "territories" or "crown dependencies". Wrythe, the micronation's capital city, consists of a suburban house in the London Borough of Sutton. Several other British houses are also claimed, and other territorial claims include part of a university campus in Australia and a holiday home in the Hebrides. The micronation also has claims in the United States, Turkey, India, Algeria, Poland and other nations.

== See also ==
- List of micronations
