= Grove Park (Sutton) =

Public park in Carshalton, London, England

Coordinates: 51.3667°N 0.1625°W

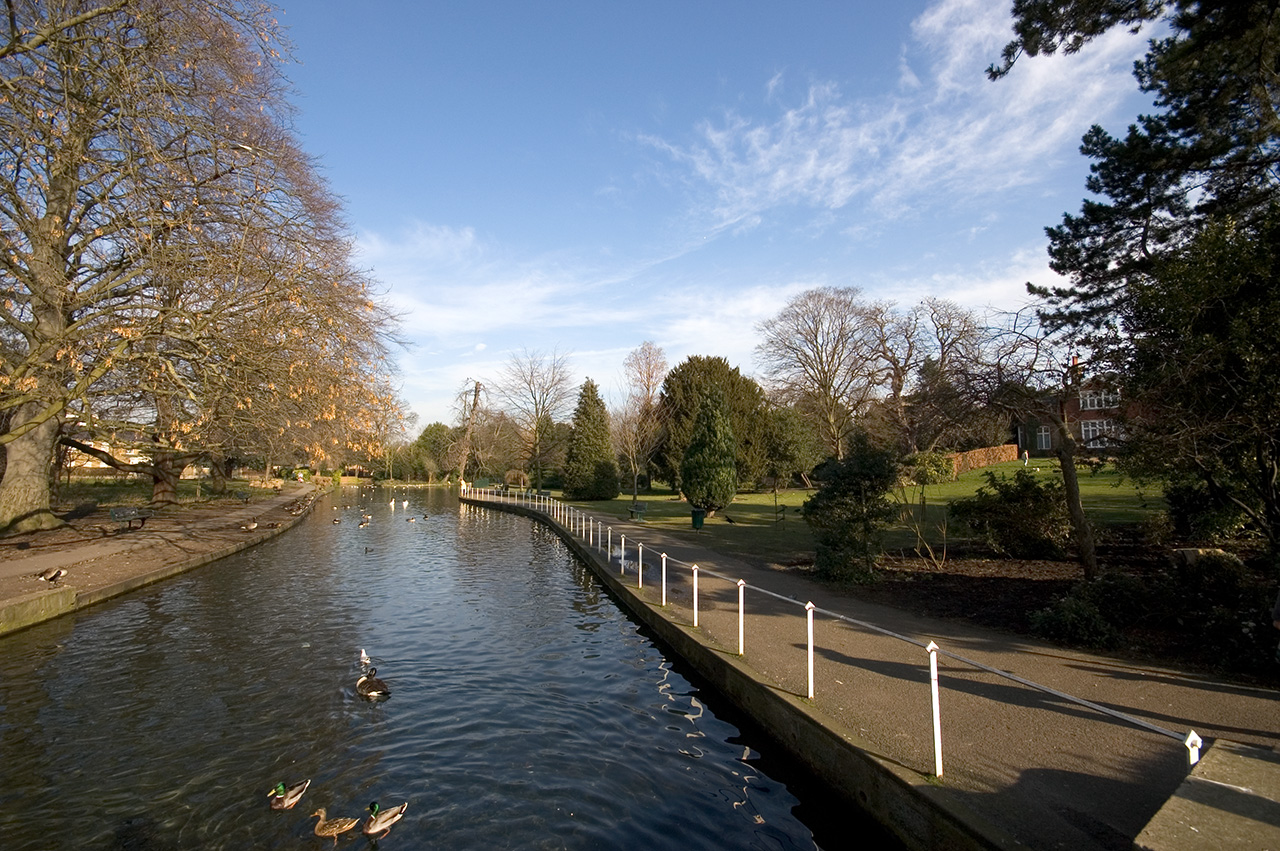
Grove Park, Carshalton. View north from the Portland stone bridge, showing the river Wandle passing through an artificial channel. The Grove house can just be seen to the right.

The Grove Park, or The Grove is a public park in Carshalton in the London Borough of Sutton. It is situated close to Carshalton Village in the area approximately bounded by the High Street, North Street and Mill Lane. The southwest corner of the park abuts one of Carshalton's ponds (Lower Pond) from where water flows through the park as the river Wandle.

== History ==
The park land was in mediaeval times part of the manor of Stone Court, then consisting mainly of meadows. The manor house was situated at the corner of North Street and Mill Lane. The original Tudor house was re-built in about 1710; recently (2005) there was an archaeological investigation into the remains of this building. In the early 19th century a new house called The Grove was built on the other side of the river on higher ground and is the large house seen today. The remaining outbuildings of Stone Court were converted to what are now education department offices. The Grove, including the ornamental gardens, was bought by Carshalton Urban District Council in 1924 and the park was opened to the public several years later.

== Features of interest ==
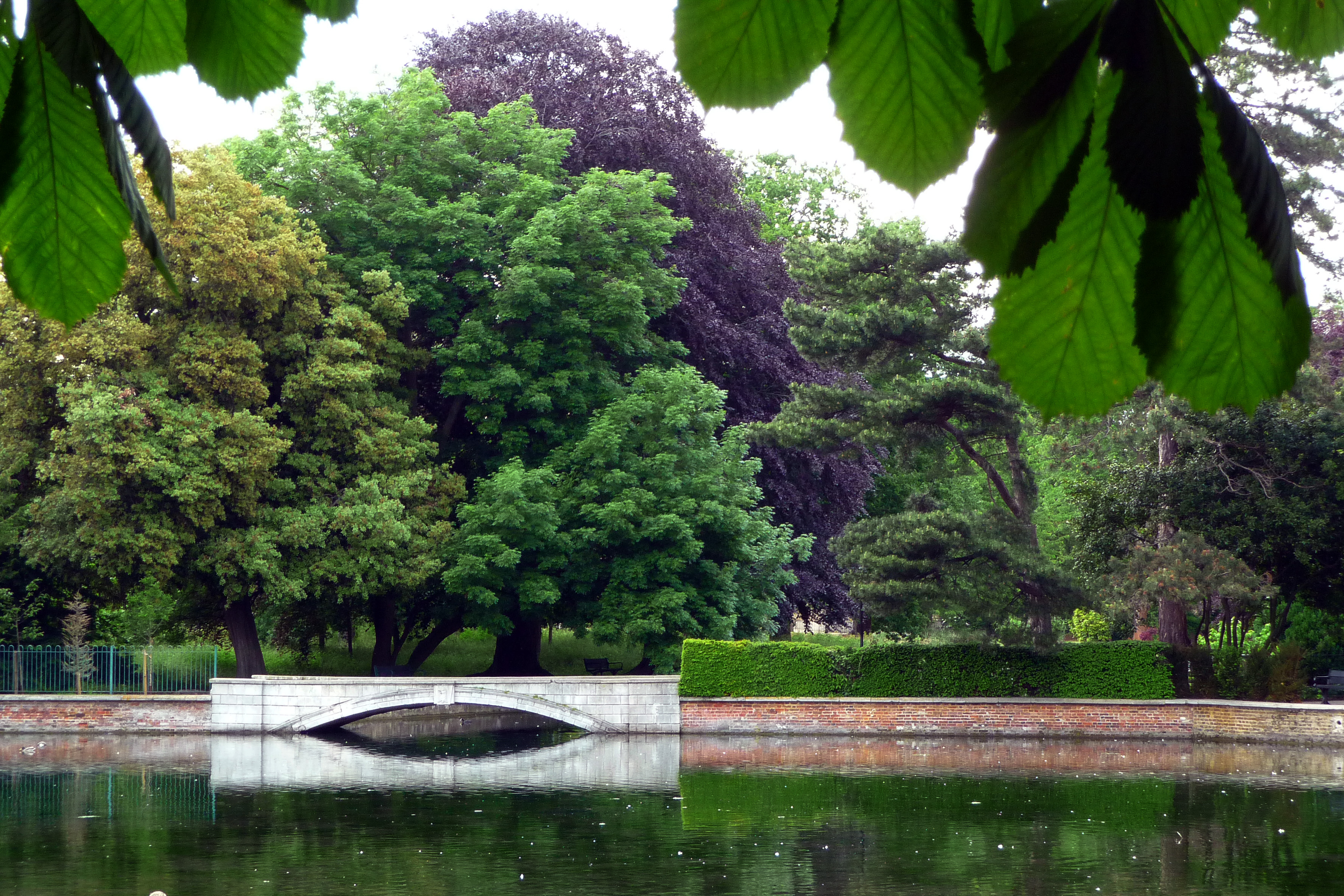
The Leoni Bridge

=== The Leoni Bridge ===
Where Grove Park meets the Lower Pond there is a white Portland stone bridge. This is sometimes referred to as the Leoni Bridge as it is conjectured that the Venetian architect Giacomo Leoni designed it. Leoni had been commissioned to design a new mansion for Carshalton Park during the early 18th century, but the mansion itself was never constructed.

=== The Grove House ===
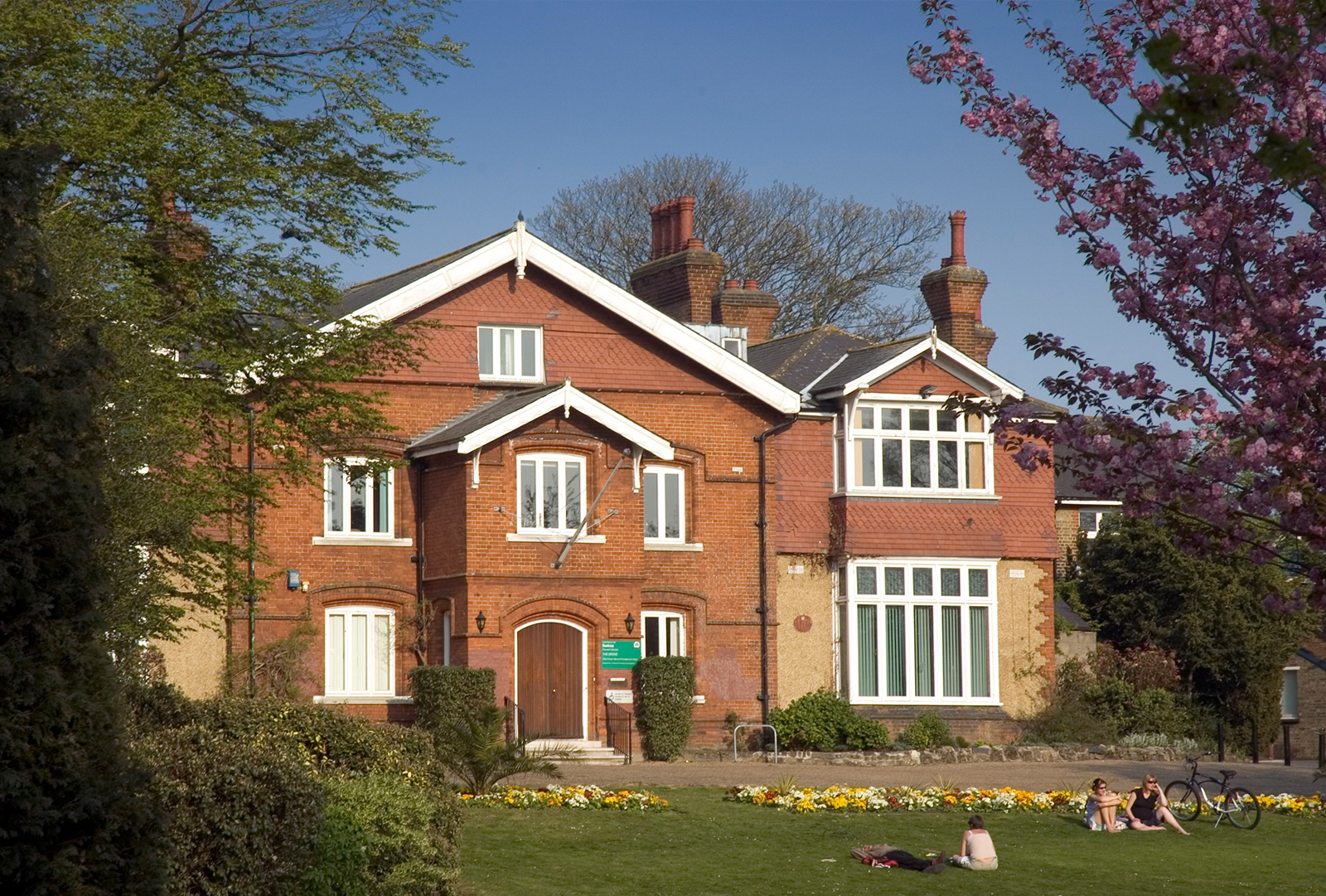
The Grove House

The house's early history is obscure, but it is shown on an 1847 map and so precedes this date. The building is now occupied by departments of the London Borough of Sutton.

=== Upper Mill ===
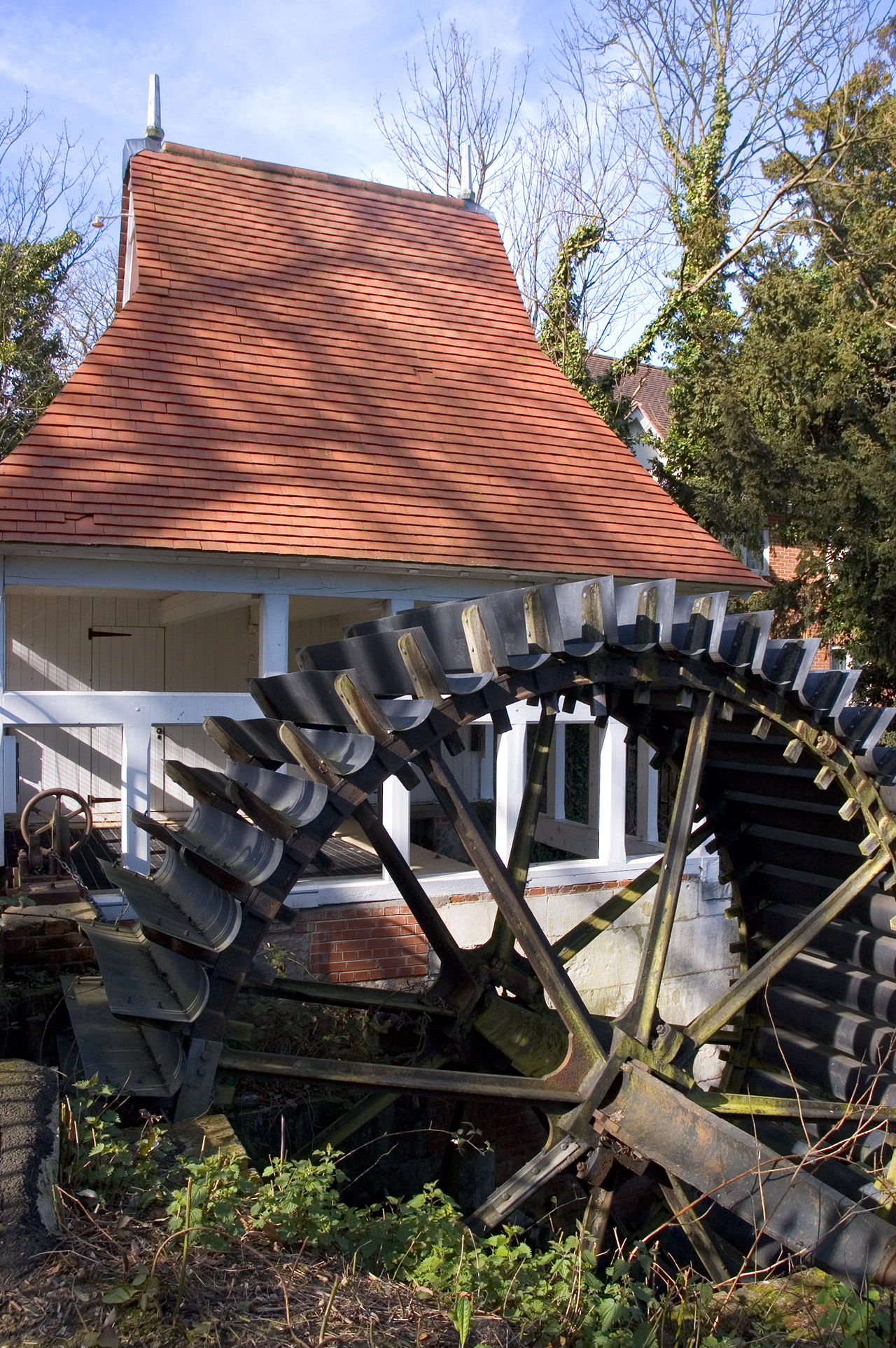
Upper Mill

It is likely that a watermill existed here from Anglo-Saxon times, although much of the current structure is a recent restoration (2004) carried out after a fire.

=== The Cascade ===
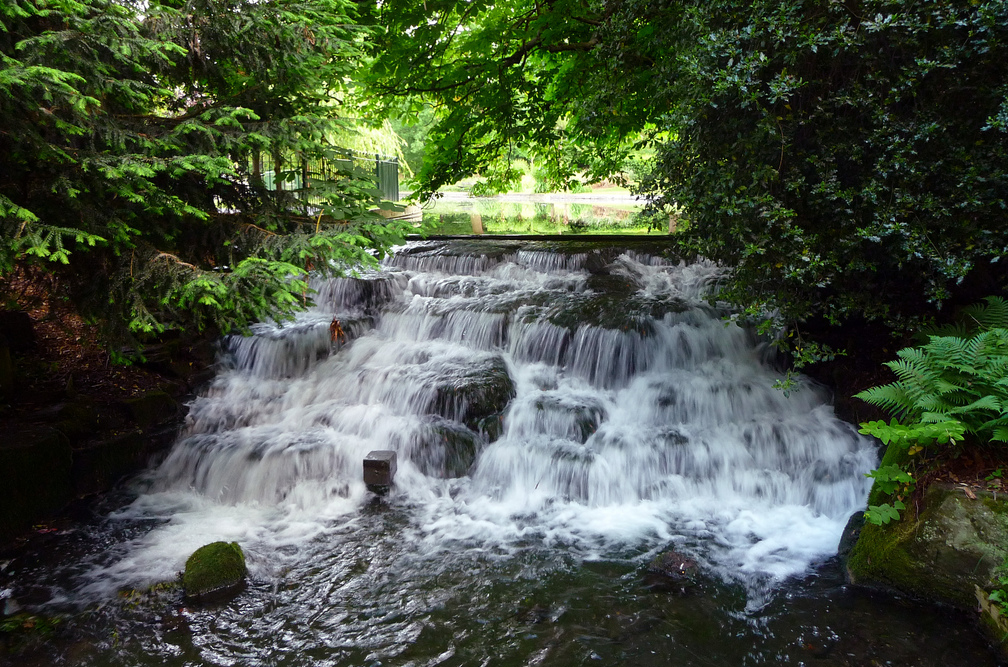
Grove Park Cascade

The cascade is near the footbridge towards the Stone Court corner of the park. The 1.5m fall is now ornamental in design and was reconstructed in the 1960s. The original purpose was to create a head of water to power Upper Mill, which is nearby.

== Recreation ==
To the east of The Grove House there are recreation grounds extending as far as the Westcroft Leisure Centre. There is an enclosed children's playground, miniature golf, cafeteria, ball court, bowling green and other facilities.

== Transport ==
The park is a short walk from Carshalton railway station, turning left on exit. The park is also on the route of Transport for London buses 127 and 157, alighting at the Carshalton Ponds stop.

== See also ==
- Carshalton Park
- Oaks Park
