= Carshalton Park =

Public park in London, England

Coordinates: 51°21.6954′N 0°9.6636′W

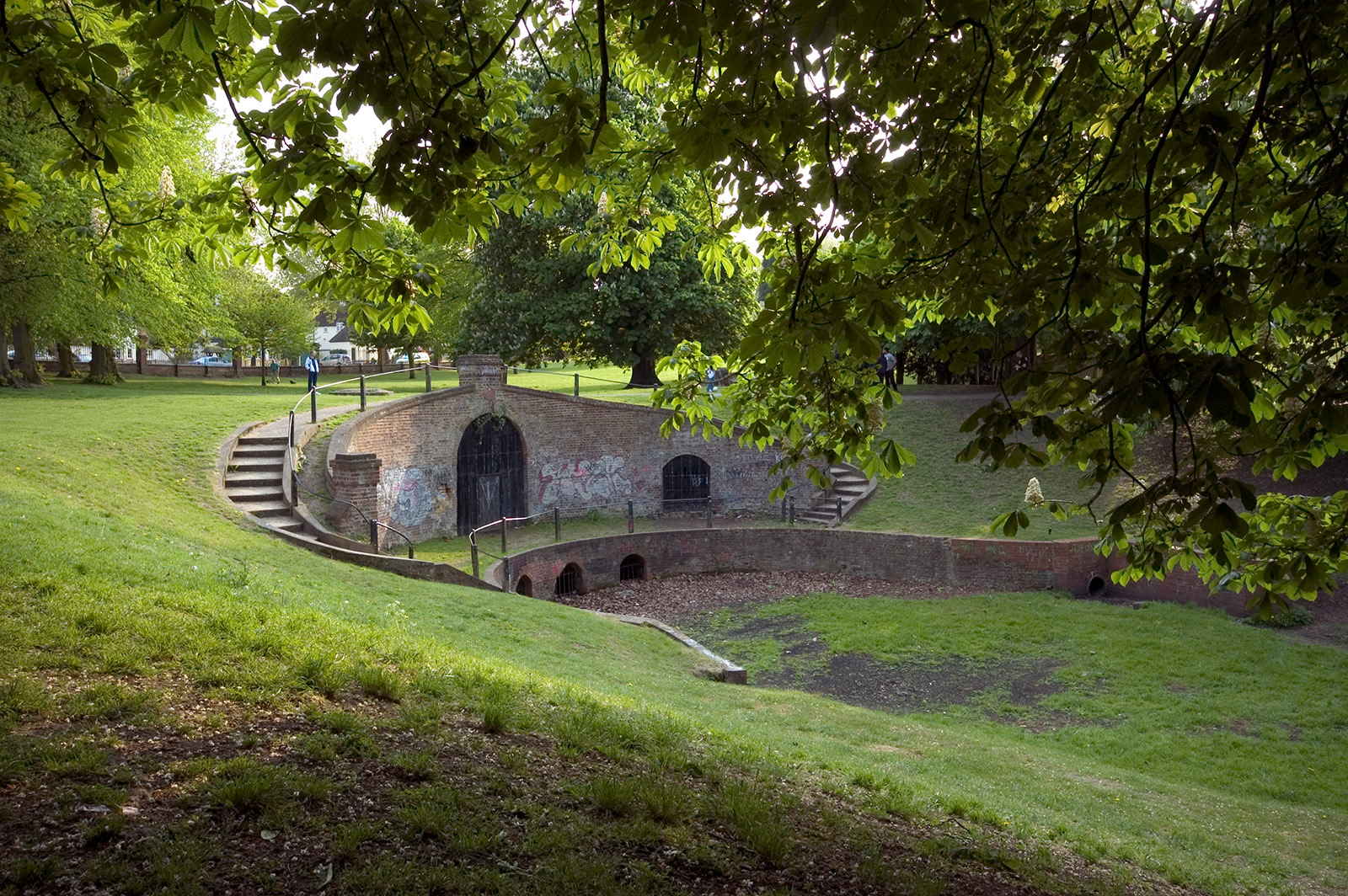
The Grotto, now in a state of disrepair and the canal dry

Carshalton Park is a public park in Carshalton, in the London Borough of Sutton. It is situated south of the High Street, in the area bounded by Ruskin Road, Ashcombe Road, Woodstock Road and The Park. Carshalton Park and some of the surrounding houses, are within a conservation area.

== History ==
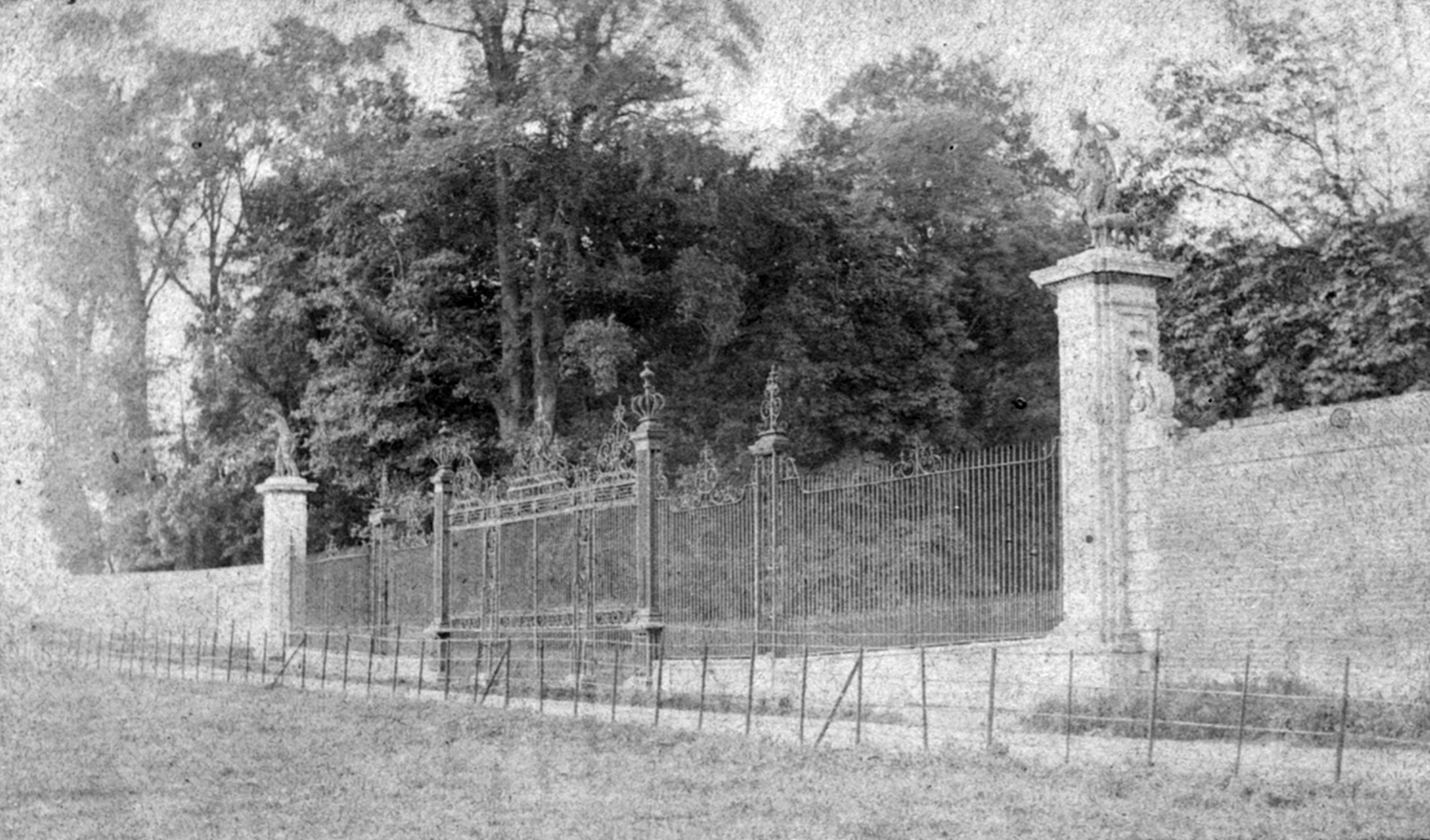
Carshalton Gates

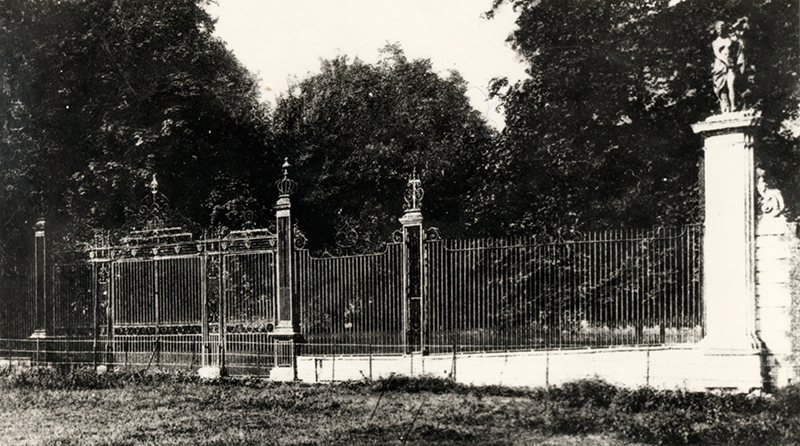
Carshalton Park Gates

The park today occupies an area of 9.28 hectares, which is about one tenth of its original size. It began to be sold off for housing development in 1892. The northern boundary previously extended as far as the High Street, with the Orangery building situated in The Square once being within the parkland.

There were deer in this park up until 1898. Plans in the early 18th century to build a new mansion, or palace, in the park involved the Venetian architect Giacomo Leoni who was chosen to design the building and carry out landscaping. Only the Orangery was built, although architectural drawings for the mansion were published. The gates made for the park in 1711 are now installed on the Gold Coast of Long Island at the site of a former estate which was turned into a public park, the Planting Fields Arboretum State Historic Park, New York.

== Features of interest ==
=== "Hog Pit" pond ===
Hog Pit is directly in front of today's main north entrance to the park. The origin of this substantial earthwork is unknown but reference to Hoggpytte can be found in medieval records for the year 1444. It is recorded that in the late 18th century Hog Pit was used as a water reservoir for mill power. Despite still often being called a pond, it is now dry and forms a simple amphitheatre.

=== The Grotto ===
The Grotto is situated in the south-east corner of the park. It was built in about 1724 as one of the first features of the ambitious designs for building and landscaping in the park. A canal, now dry, extends north from the grotto and continues into Carshalton Place. The structure is now in a state of disrepair and access into its interior is normally prevented by locked gates. It originally had an ornamental iron gate and a marble pavement and roof covered with shells. A branch of the River Wandle used to rise in a subterranean chalk chamber beneath the Grotto, and the river flowed through the centre of the park past the mansion house. In early 2014, following months of heavy rain, the river again flowed from the grotto for a time.

=== Air Raid Shelter ===
In January 2012, a forgotten World War II air raid shelter was discovered that protected hundreds of people from German bombs. The shelter, which apparently had space for up to 1,000 people, was discovered after a hole appeared in the ground in the Park. It was found by a council worker in just his second week in the council parks department. Satellite images and old council minutes were used to verify the find and surmise that the shelter was built to help keep people in the nearby cottage hospital safe. Carshalton was hit a number of times by German Luftwaffe bombers during the war and also suffered a number of V1 rocket strikes.

== Recreation ==
Carshalton Park has three tennis courts, a netball court, a basketball court and a children's playground.

== Events ==
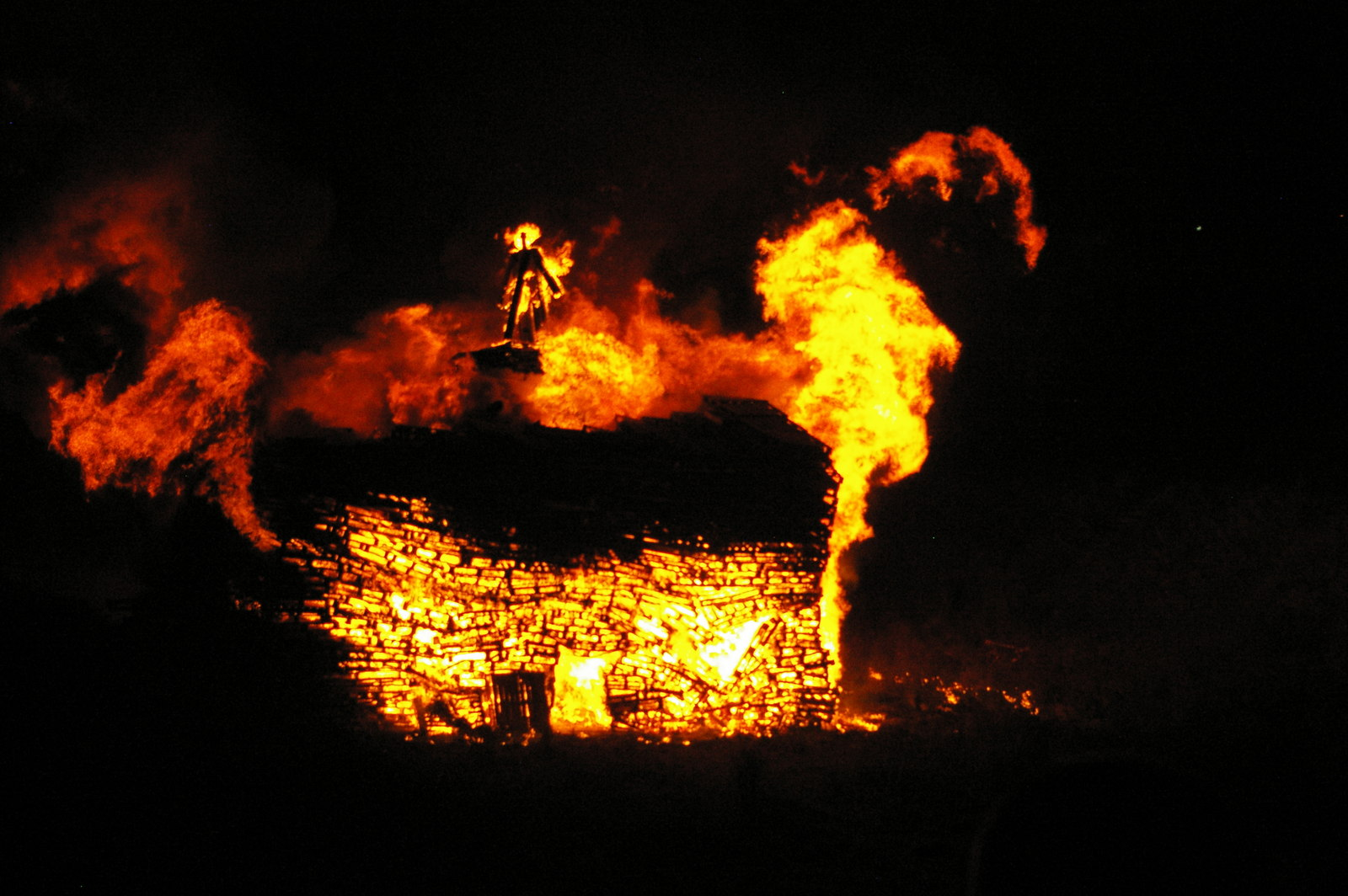
2011 bonfire

An annual charity fireworks event is held in the park for Bonfire Night. Organised by Wallington and Carshalton Round Table, the event is on the first Saturday in November. Carshalton Fireworks was first organised in 1957 and has run every year until the present day. It is currently one of the largest charity fireworks display in the South-East of England attracting crowds of up to 15,000 spectators from the local community.

Carshalton Carnival, which is jointly organised by the Wallington and Carshalton Round Table and Rotary Club, it is held in the park, on the second Saturday in June.

"The Environmental Fair" run by EcoLocal, a local charity, takes place on the August Bank Holiday Monday.

== Transport ==
Three railway stations are within walking distance of Carshalton Park. They are, in order of proximity, Carshalton Beeches railway station, Wallington railway station and Carshalton railway station. Refer to the map below for directions.

Four bus routes stop on Carshalton High Street, approximately 0.3 miles from the Park.

== See also ==
- Grove Park
- Oaks Park
