= Roger Bowles =

English cricketer

Personal information
- Full name: Roger Andrew Bowles
- Born: 1 February 1936 (age 90); Carshalton, Surrey, England
- Batting: Right-handed
- Bowling: Leg break googly

Domestic team information
- Years: Team
- 1957: Oxford University

Career statistics
Competition	First-class
Matches	3
Runs scored	92
Batting average	15.33
100s/50s	–/–
Top score	43
Catches/stumpings	–/–
- Source: Cricinfo, 4 January 2020

Roger Andrew Bowles (born 1 February 1936) is an English former first-class cricketer.

Born at Carshalton in February 1936, Bowles attended Brasenose College, Oxford. While studying at Oxford, he made three appearances in first-class cricket for Oxford University in 1957, against Worcestershire, the Free Foresters and Leicestershire. He scored a total of 92 runs at an average of 15.33 in these three matches, with a high score of 43.
