= David Mitchell (cricketer) =

English cricketer

Personal information
- Full name: David Alexander Mitchell
- Born: 20 February 1980 (age 46); Carshalton, Surrey, England
- Batting: Left-handed
- Bowling: Right-arm medium-fast

Domestic team information
- Years: Team
- 2002: Devon

Career statistics
Competition	List A
Matches	1
Runs scored	10
Batting average	10.00
100s/50s	–/–
Top score	10
Balls bowled	12
Wickets	–
Bowling average	–
5 wickets in innings	–
10 wickets in match	–
Best bowling	–
Catches/stumpings	–/–
- Source: Cricinfo, 30 January 2011

David Alexander Mitchell (born 20 February 1980) is a former English cricketer. Mitchell is a left-handed batsman who bowls right-arm medium-fast. He was born at Carshalton, Surrey.

Mitchell played a single List A match for Devon in the 2nd round of the 2003 Cheltenham & Gloucester Trophy against Cumberland which was played in 2002 at The Maer Ground in Exmouth. He scored 10 runs in the match before being dismissed by Marcus Sharp. With the ball he bowled two wicketless overs.
