= Carshalton =

Town in south London, England

Coordinates: 51.3686°N 0.1617°W

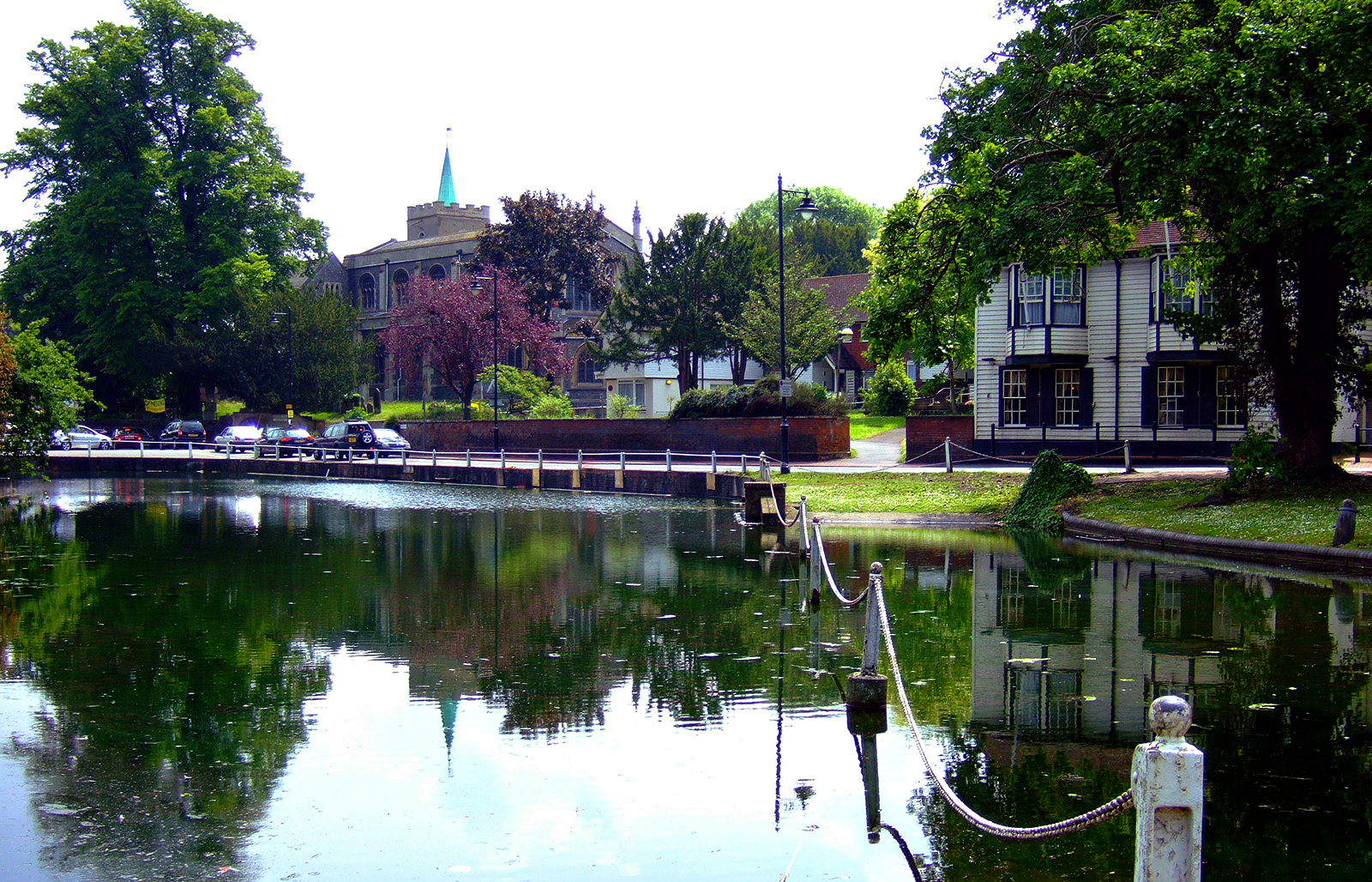
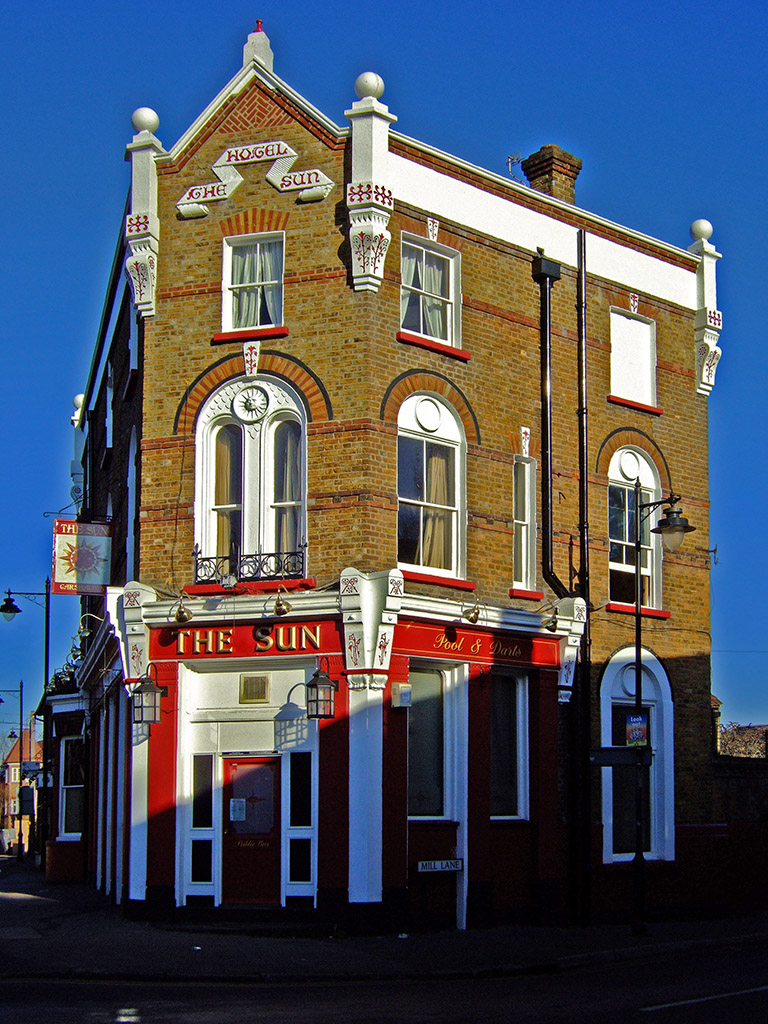
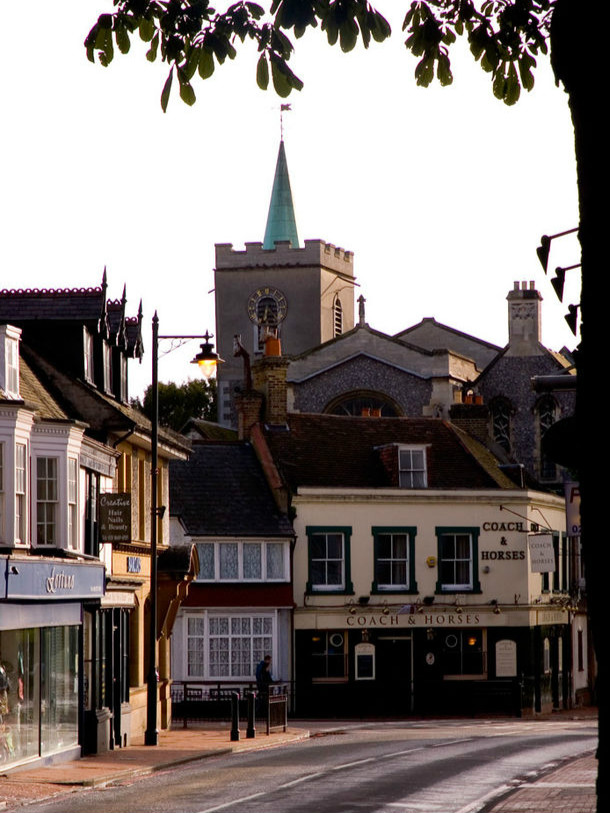
- Top to bottom, left to right: the Upper Pond in Carshalton Village; the Sun public house in the conservation area; High Street, with All Saints Church in the distance; the Leoni Bridge and the Grove.

- Location within Greater London
- Population: 29,917 (2011 Census. 3 Wards)
- OS grid reference: TQ275645
- London borough: Sutton
- Ceremonial county: Greater London
- Region: London
- Country: England
- Sovereign state: United Kingdom
- Post town: CARSHALTON
- Postcode district: SM5
- Dialling code: 020
- Police: Metropolitan
- Fire: London
- Ambulance: London
- UK Parliament: Carshalton and Wallington
- London Assembly: Croydon and Sutton

Carshalton (/kɑːrˈʃɔːltənˌ-ˈʃɒl-/ (Note: Also before the 20th century commonly pronounced /keɪsˈhɔːtən/, kays-HAWT-ən) kar-SHAWL-tən, -SHOL-) is a town, with a historic village centre, in south London, England, within the London Borough of Sutton. It is situated around 9.5 miles (15.3 km) southwest of Charing Cross and around 1.2 miles (1.9 km) east of Sutton town centre, in the valley of the River Wandle, one of the sources of which is Carshalton Ponds in the south of the village. Prior to the creation of Greater London in 1965, Carshalton was in the administrative county of Surrey.

Carshalton consists of a number of neighbourhoods. The main focal point, Carshalton Village, is visually scenic and picturesque. At its centre it has two adjoining ponds, which are overlooked by the Grade II listed All Saints Church on the south side and the Victorian Grove Park on the north side. The Grade II listed Honeywood Museum sits on the west side, a few yards from the water. There are a number of other listed buildings, as well as three conservation areas, including one in the village. In addition to Honeywood Museum, there are several other cultural features in Carshalton, including the Charles Cryer Theatre and an art gallery in Oaks Park. It is also home to the Sutton Ecology Centre, and every year an environmental fair is held in Carshalton Park to the south of the village.

Carshalton is part of the Carshalton and Wallington parliamentary constituency formed in 1983. Tom Brake (Liberal Democrat) was its MP from 1997 to 2019, and Elliot Colburn (Conservative) was the MP from 2019 to 2024. As of 2024, Bobby Dean (Liberal Democrat) is the current MP. Carshalton is part of the Carshalton Central and Carshalton South & Clockhouse wards for elections to Sutton London Borough Council.

The combined population of the five wards comprising Carshalton was 45,525 at the 2001 census. A majority of the population of Carshalton is in the ABC1 social group. In the 2011 Census the wards had been merged into 3 with a total population of 29,917.

== History ==
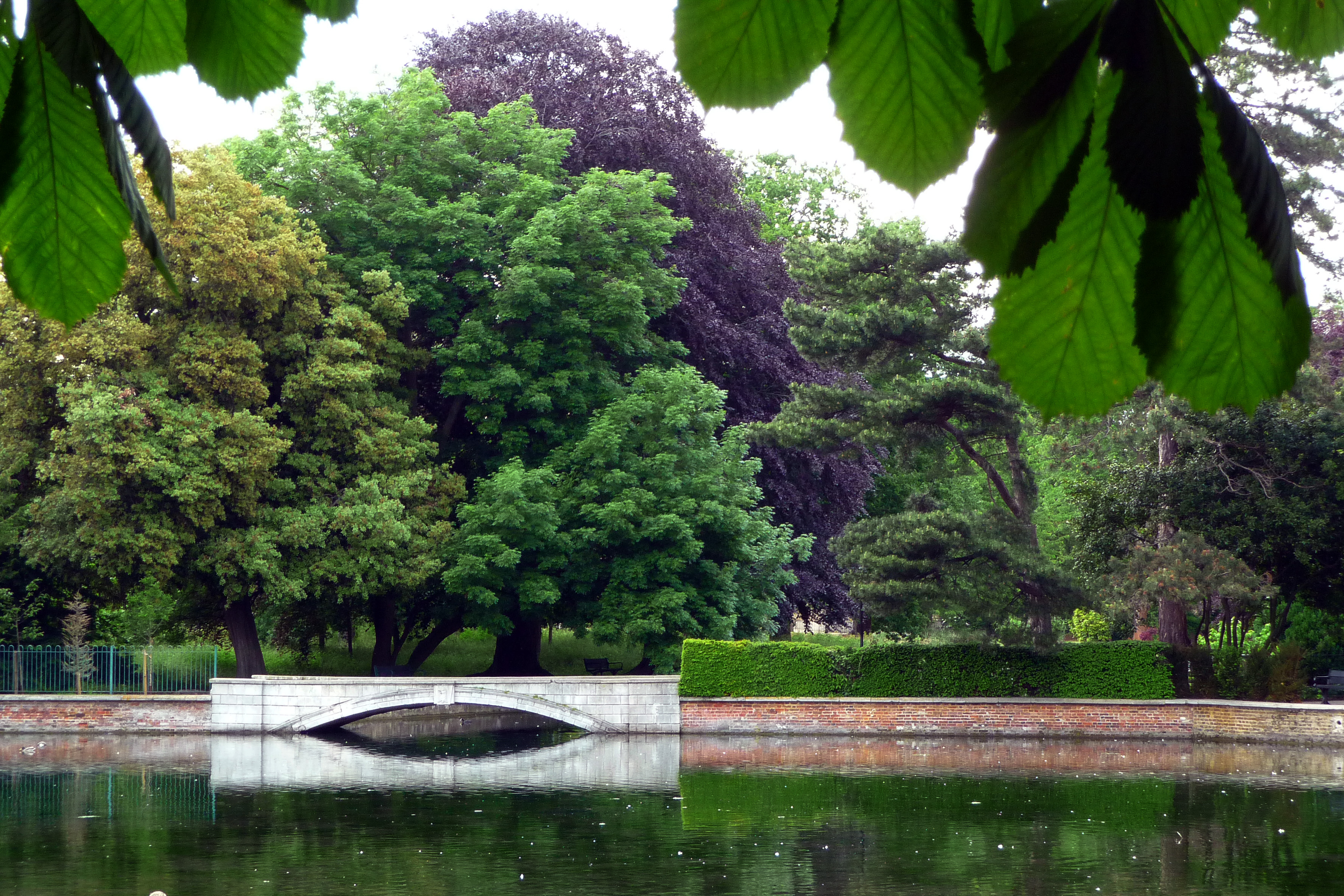
Looking across Lower Pond to the Leoni Bridge and The Grove

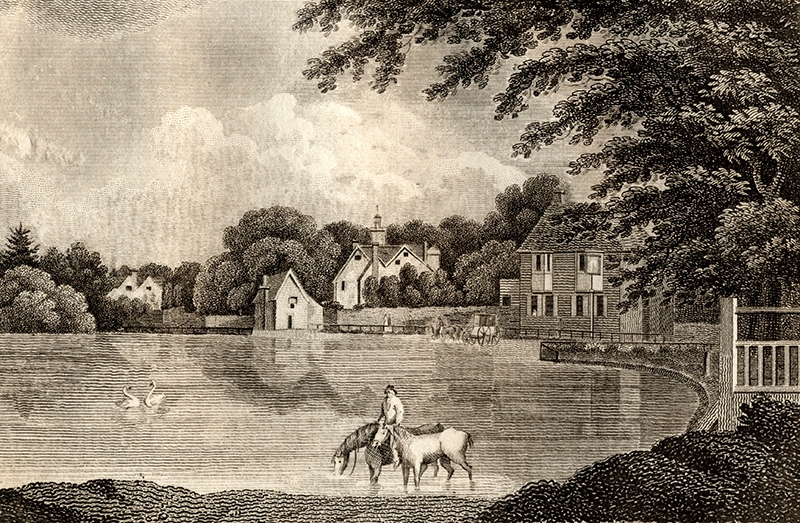
Carshalton Pond, 1806, before division into two ponds

To the south of the area now known as Carshalton, remains of artefacts dating from the Neolithic to the Iron Age have been found, suggesting that this was an early place of habitation. Prior to the Norman Conquest it is recorded that there were five manors in this location owned by five freemen.

The village lay within the Anglo-Saxon administrative division of Wallington hundred.

Carshalton appears in Domesday Book as Aultone. It was held by Goisfrid (Geoffrey) de Mandeville. Its domesday assets were: 3½ hides; 1 church, 10 ploughs, 1 mill worth £1 15s 0d, 22 acres (89,000 m^{2}) of meadow, woodland worth 2 hogs. It rendered £15 10s 0d.

In the Domesday era there was a church and a water mill in Carshalton, which was then still made up of a number of hamlets dotted around the area, as opposed to a single compact village.

In the Middle Ages the land in the village was generally farmed in the form of a number of open fields, divided into strips. The number of strips which each land owner possessed was based roughly on his wealth. There was also an area of open downland in the south of the parish for grazing sheep.

Carshalton was known for its springs; these may have given the place its name Cars – Aul – ton. Aul means well or spring. A ton is a farm which was in some way enclosed. The meaning of the Cars element is uncertain but early spellings (Kersaulton and Cresaulton) may indicate connection with a cross or perhaps cress, watercress having been grown locally.

In his book History of the Worthies of England, the 17th-century historian Thomas Fuller refers to Carshalton for its walnuts and trout.

Land was primarily put to arable use and the river Wandle gave rise to manufacturing using water power. A water mill to grind corn was mentioned in the Domesday Book. By the end of the 18th century, it was recorded that there were several mills for the production of paper and parchment, leather, snuff, log-wood and seed oil. There were also bleaching grounds for calico.

There were timber-framed houses from the end of the Middle Ages, and brick and wooden weather boarded houses from the 17th, 18th and 19th centuries. By the middle of the 19th century, Carshalton's population was 2,411, making it, at the time, the largest village in what was to become the London Borough of Sutton. It had a very varied character with houses for the wealthy at one extreme and tenements in back yards at the other. In 1847 a railway line was laid from Croydon to Epsom through Carshalton, but the first station was built in fields south of Wallington. A station in the village itself was not established until 1868 when the Sutton to Mitcham Line was constructed. The development of Carshalton got into its stride in the early 1890s when the Carshalton Park Estate was sold for housing development.

Carshalton is mentioned in the following historic Surrey folk-rhyme:

"Sutton for mutton,
Carshalton for beeves,
Epsom for whores,
and Ewell for thieves."

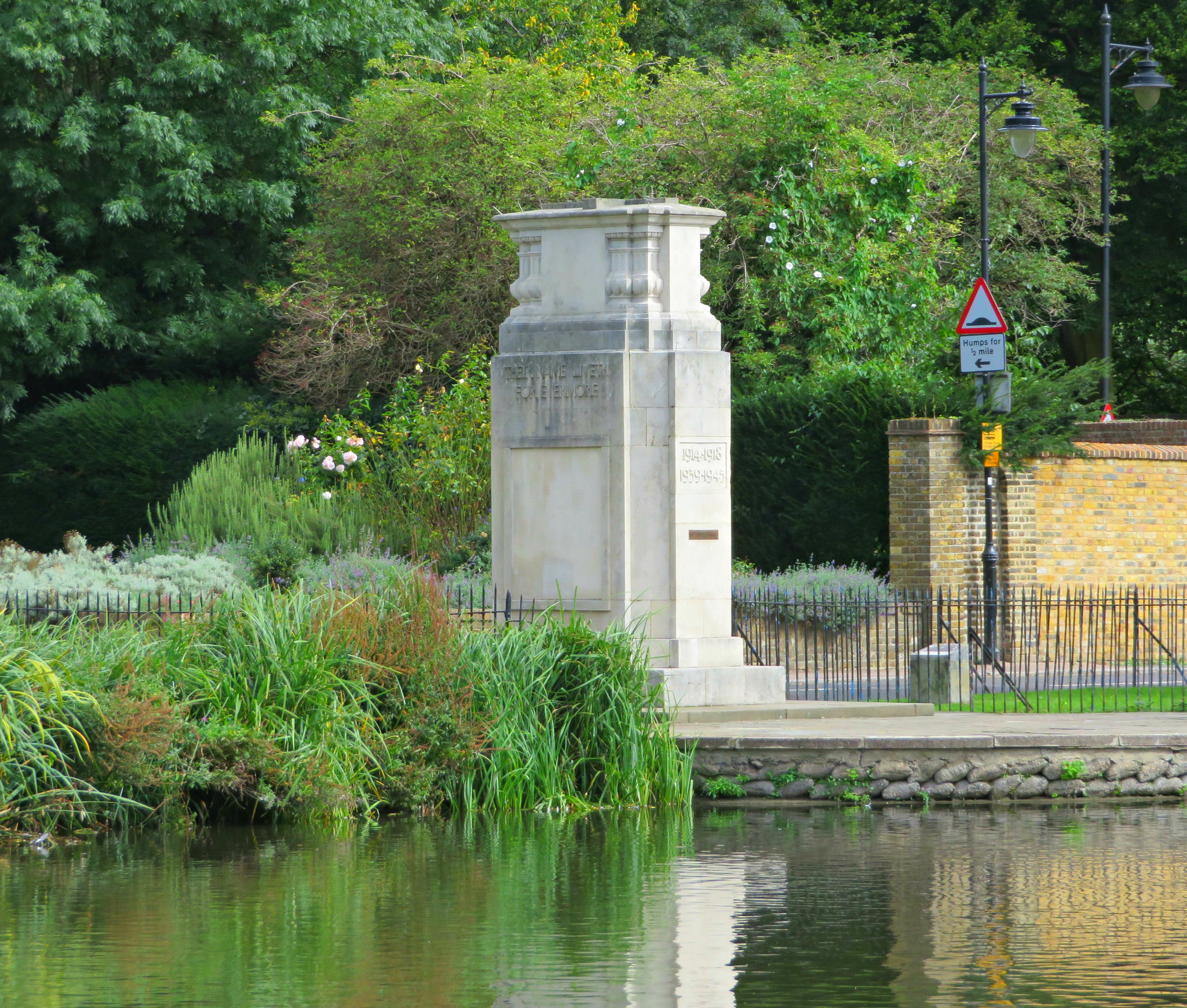
Carshalton War Memorial

During the Victorian era and into the early 20th century, Carshalton was known for its lavender fields (also see below under "Landmarks"), but the increasing land demand for residential building put an end to commercial growing.

The Commonwealth War Graves Commission lists 78 civilian casualties in Carshalton during World War II.

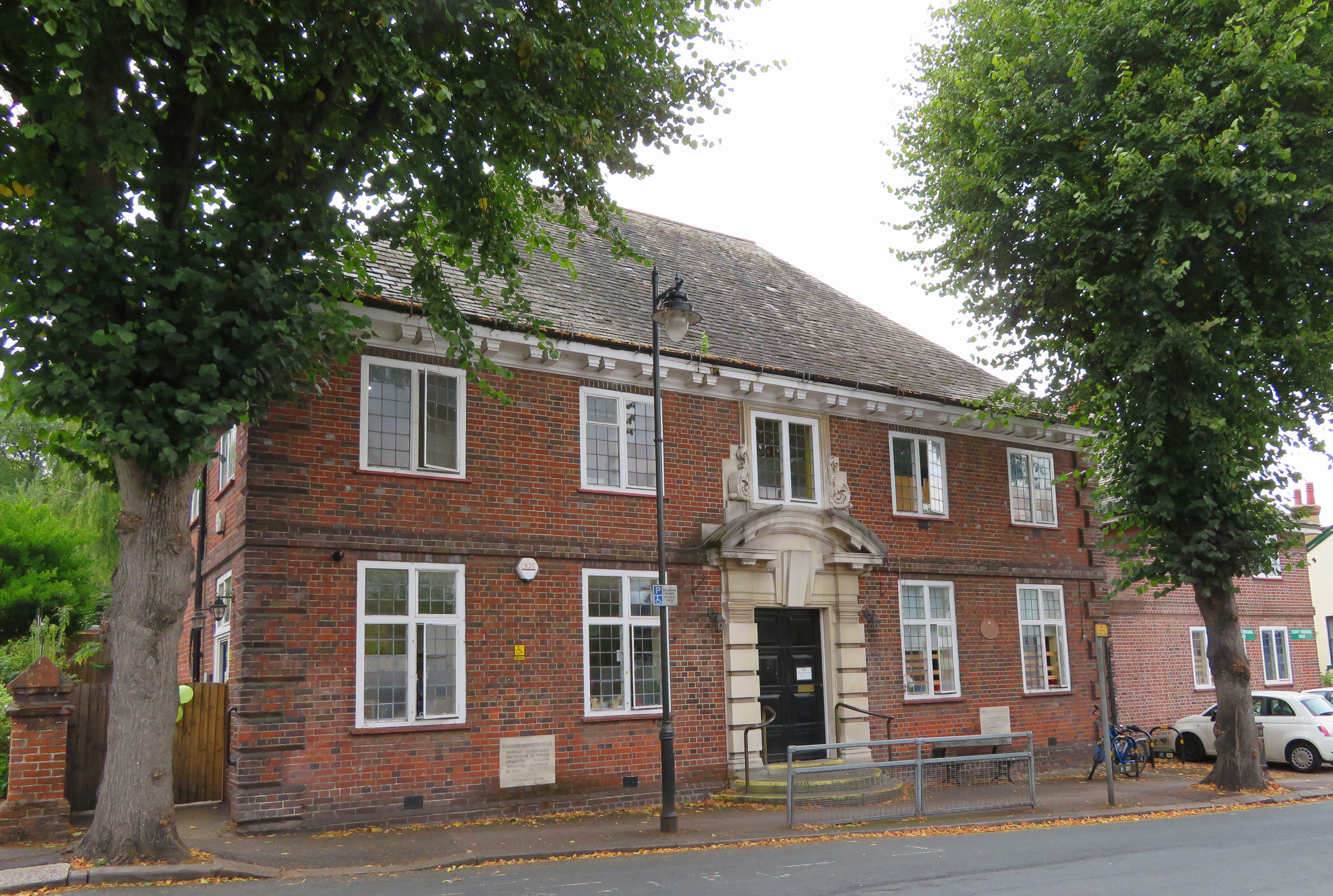
Carshalton Council Offices, later converted for use as the public library

Carshalton formed part of the Carshalton Urban District from 1894 to 1965; the UDC was based at the Carshalton Council Offices in The Square until the 1920s when it moved to The Grove.

== Geography ==
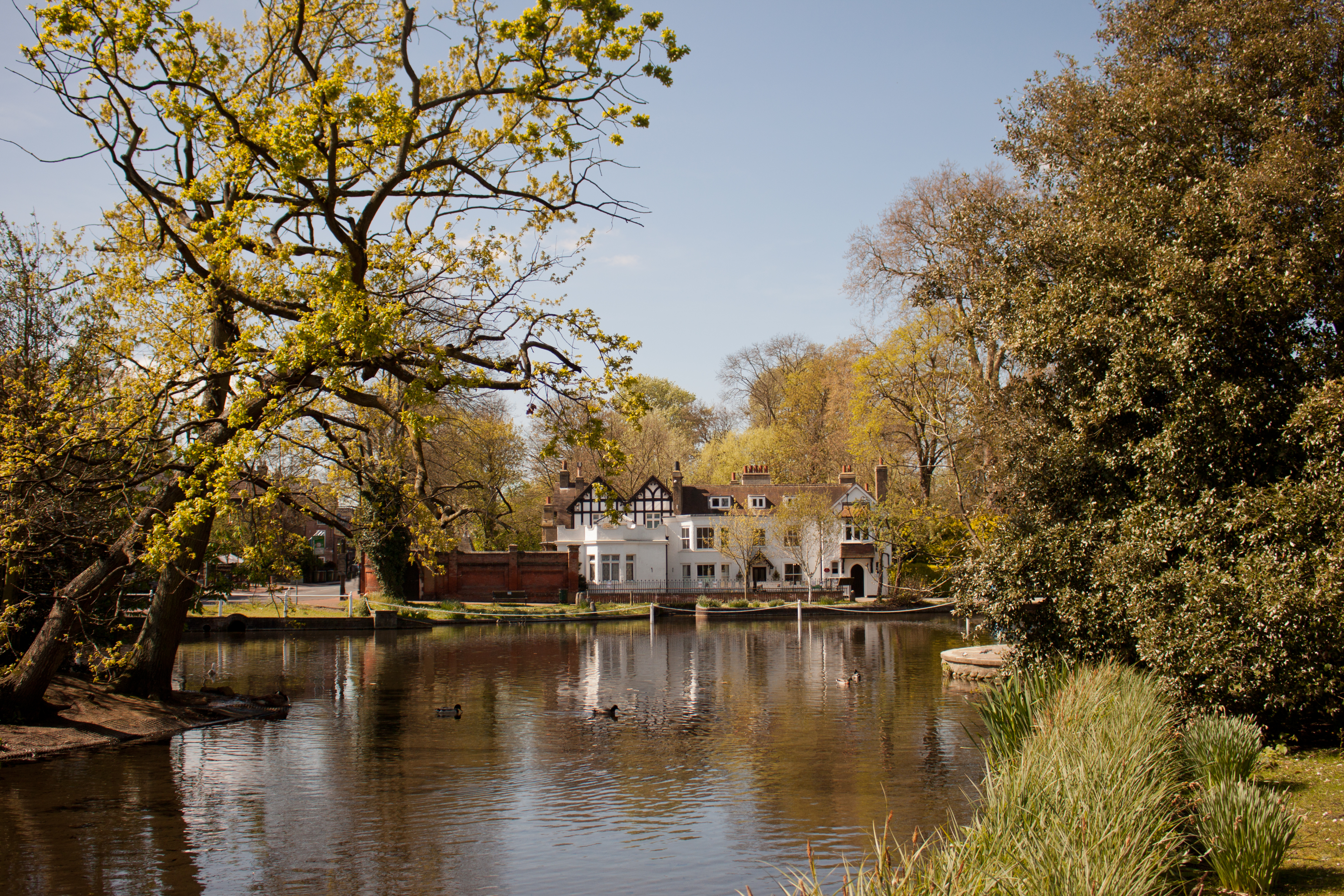
The western pond ("Upper Pond") in Carshalton Village

Central Carshalton, around the ponds and High Street, retains a village character, although the busy A232 runs through the area. There are a number of buildings and open spaces protected by the Carshalton Village Conservation Area. given the status by the London Borough of Sutton. In 1993 its boundary was extended to include parts of Mill Lane and parts of The Square and Talbot Road, containing the All Saints Church Rectory. The Conservation Area contains many of the Listed and Locally Listed Buildings which contribute to the historical significance of the area, and is widely considered to contain some of the finest historical architecture and road layout within the Borough. An example is Stone Court, an early 19th-century building with a gate house, situated on the northern edge of Grove Park. The Sun public house, is a fine example of Victorian decorative brickwork, and makes a positive contribution to the Conservation Area.

The Conservation Area also comprises open parkland of historical importance, including the grounds of Carshalton House Estate (which contains St. Philomena's Catholic School, St Mary's Junior School, St Mary's Infants School and the Water Tower) and The Grove Park (which contains The Grove).

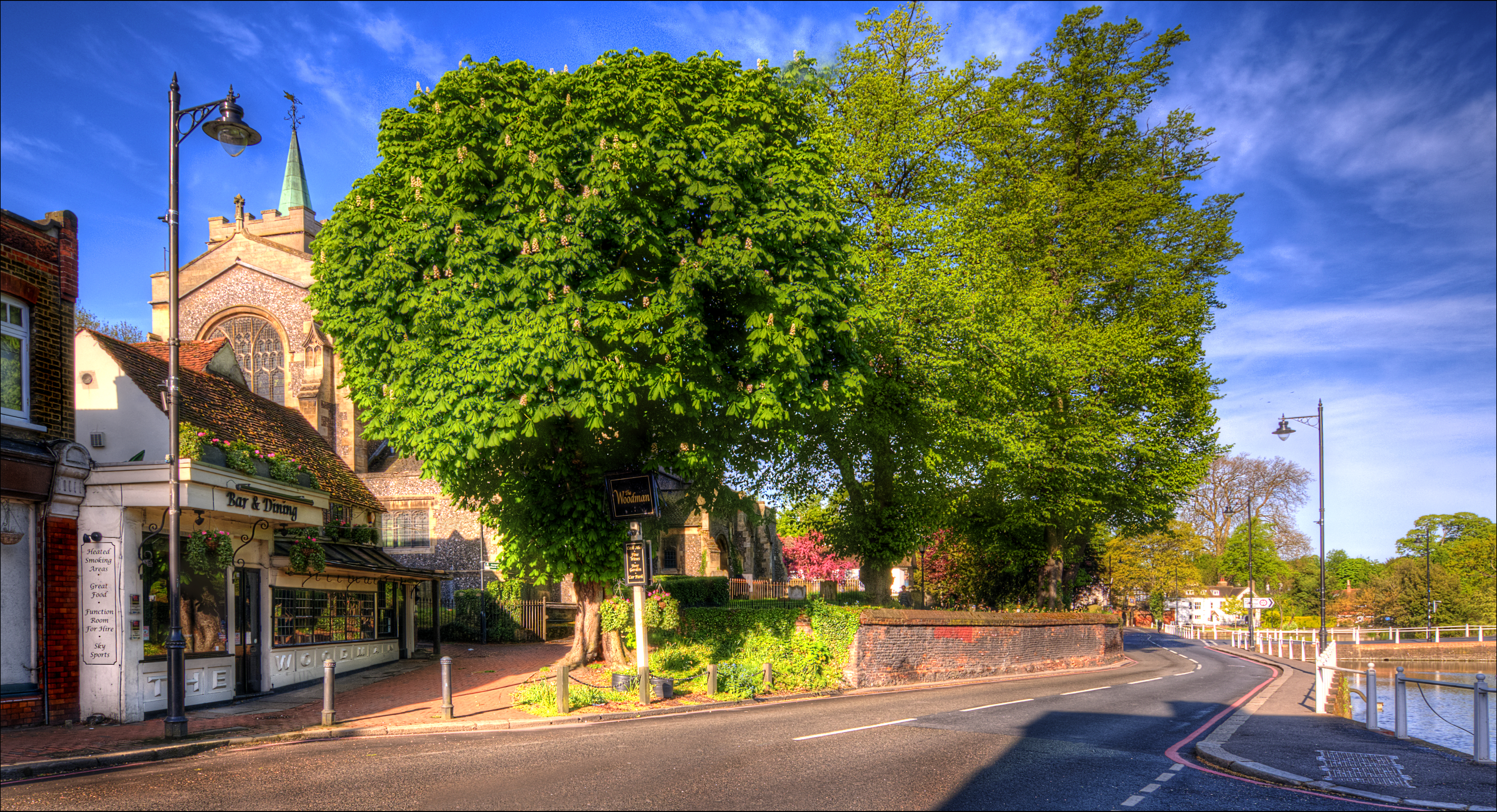
All Saints' Church behind the Woodman pub

Other conservation areas in Carshalton are the Wrythe Green Conservation Area and the Park Hill Conservation Area.

Sutton is centred 1.2 miles (1.9 km) west of the village centre of Carshalton, its east–west central street can be considered a continuation of Carshalton's own main street, an almost straight A-road route to Orpington via Croydon, beginning in Ewell.

Carshalton-on-the-Hill is the residential area on the high chalk upland ground to the south of Carshalton Park from Boundary Road in the east, Crichton Road/Queen Mary's Avenue/Diamond Jubilee Way in the west and the smallholdings of Little Woodcote to the south. In the heart of Carshalton-on-the-Hill is Stanley Park (which is often used as a term to describe the area).

Carshalton Beeches is the area to the west of Carshalton-on-the-Hill. It is centred 0.6 miles (0.97 km) south-west of Carshalton village centre, on the crossroads of Banstead Road and Downside Road/Waverley Way. It grew up around the railway station which was named after Beeches Avenue, a street near to its location; which, in turn, is named after the beech trees which line it.

The Wrythe lies between Carshalton village to the south and St Helier to the north-west. Its name is thought to derive from the rye that was once grown in this area, or from the Anglo-Saxon word rithe which means a small stream. During the time of the Roman occupation of the British Isles, a small spring was situated near the green, now adjacent to a BP garage. Roman activity in the area is confirmed by the fact that there was once a Roman Villa built in Beddington, just a couple of miles away, and a number of roads in the vicinity of Roman origin. The spring has since disappeared under ground and the culvert it feeds flows into the Wandle near Hackbridge.

== Landmarks ==
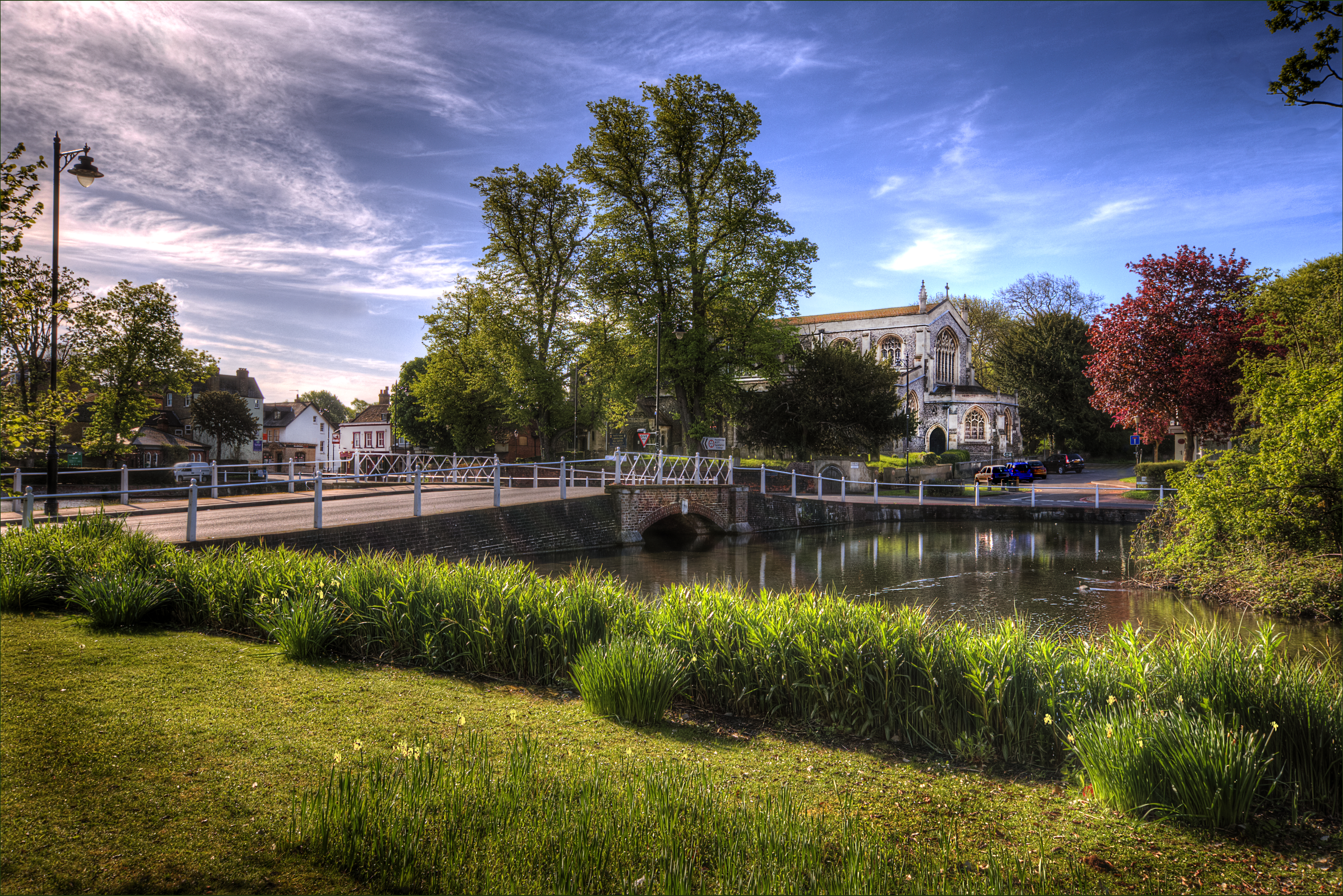
Looking across Upper Pond towards All Saints Church

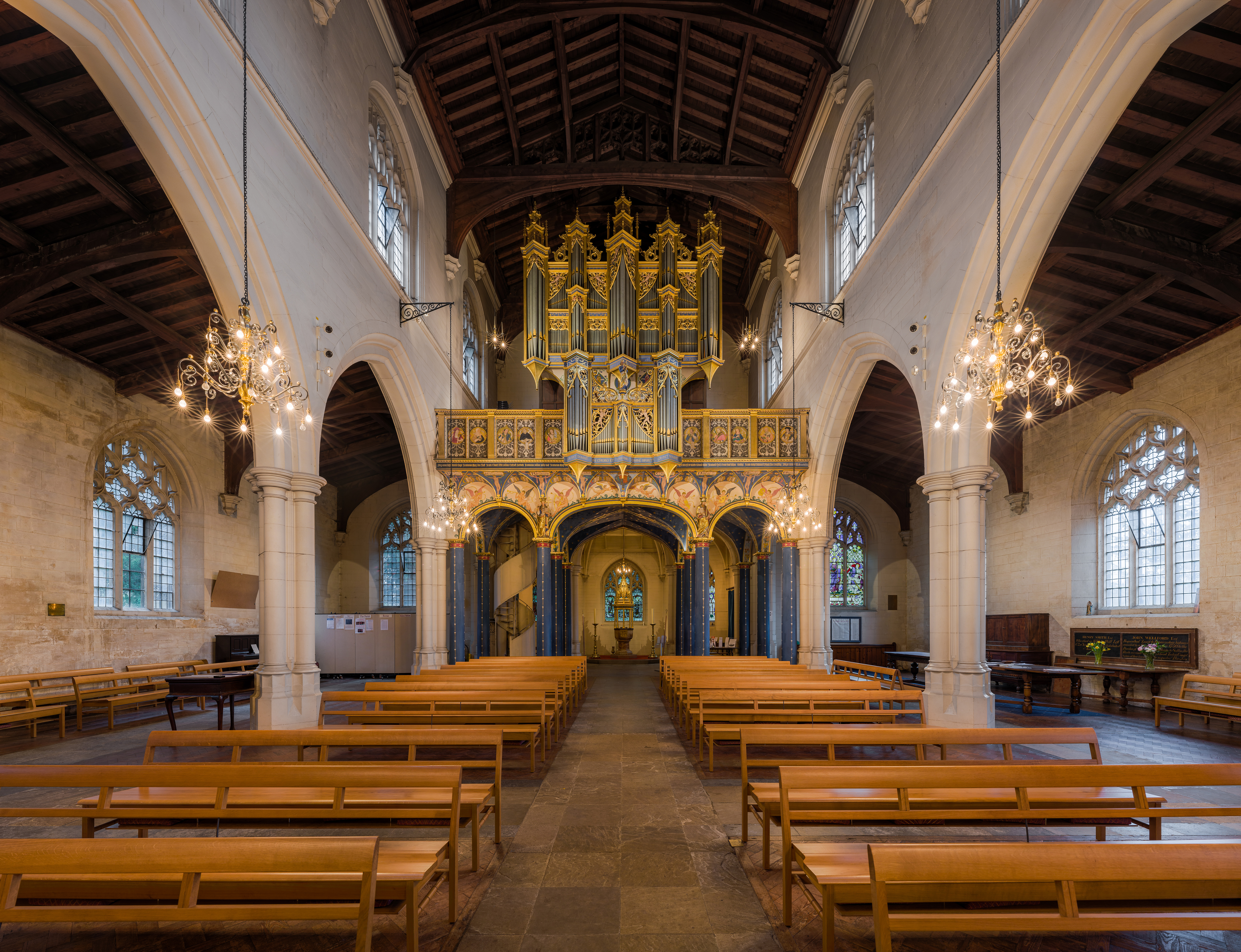
All Saints Church interior

=== All Saints Church ===
The Grade II* listed Anglican parish church of All Saints is located at the west end of Carshalton High Street, opposite Carshalton Ponds. A church has stood on this site since at least Norman times and probably much longer. The current church contains 12th century work; the tower is the oldest part of the building and is thought to date back to before the Norman Conquest. The church has been much extended over the centuries: the north side, which most visitors see first, is a Victorian facade constructed mostly of dark flint; but the south side is earlier, and shows signs of the many alterations that have been made. The most significant change to the building was in 1891 when a new nave and north aisle were added. The dramatic west end gallery, which accommodates the large three manual Willis Organ, was designed by the Anglo-catholic architect Ninian Comper.

Just outside the churchyard wall is a spring locally known as "Anne Boleyn's Well". It is popularly said to have received this name because it appeared when Anne Boleyn's horse kicked a stone and a spring of water appeared. But the more likely explanation is that the name is a corruption of "Boulogne". The Counts of Boulogne owned land here in the 12th century and there may have been a chapel dedicated to Our Lady of Boulogne near the well.

=== Strawberry Lodge ===
Constructed in 1685, Strawberry Lodge is one of Carshalton's oldest buildings. It was built by Josias Dewye who was described in records at the time as a 'clothworker and citizen of London'. In the late 17th century Josias moved from Chilworth to Carshalton to run a Gunpowder Mill on the River Wandle and decided to make his home nearby at the lodge.

Located on the corner of Strawberry Lane and Mill Lane, Strawberry Lodge is owned by Carshalton Baptist Church. Besides being a place of worship it is also used during the week as a conference and training centre. During the 1990s the site was renovated by the Baptist Church supported by the London Borough of Sutton.

=== Lavender Fields ===
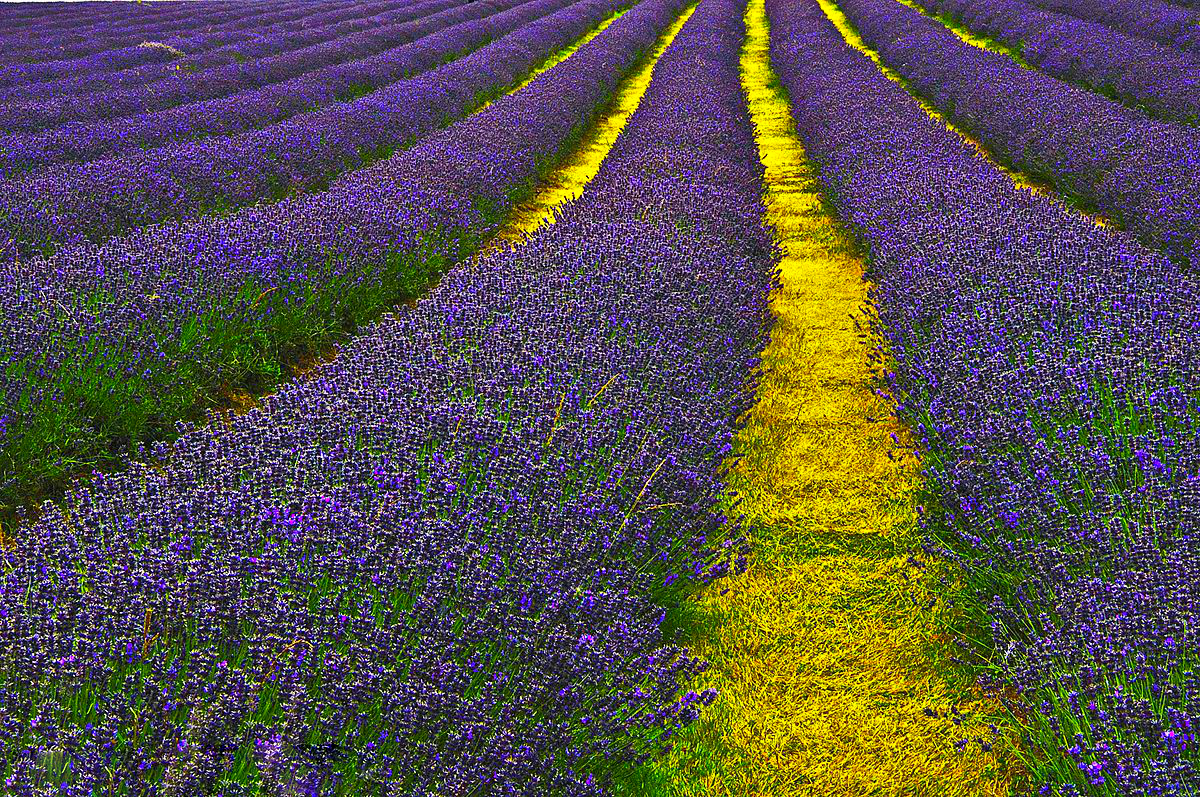
Lavender field in the south of Carshalton

There are two historic lavender fields. One, at Oaks Way, Carshalton Beeches is a not-for-profit community project that manages three acres of lavender. The other, a 25-acre commercial site in Croydon Lane called Mayfield, is popular with tourists. It is located just within the Carshalton South and Clockhouse ward within the London Borough of Sutton. This area was once famous as the "Lavender Capital of the World". From the 18th to the early 20th centuries the North Downs of Surrey, with its chalky free-draining soil, ideal for lavender growing, were at the centre of worldwide production of lavender. It was a very prosperous part of the local agriculture. Blue fields could be seen all over Mitcham, Croydon, Wallington, Banstead, Carshalton and Sutton. The scale of the operation can be understood from the fact that the Daily News in 1914 was able to state:

At Carshalton Beeches in every direction the low hill sides of the farm beyond Beeches Halt are swept with the bloomy pastel tint of the lavender flowers.

=== Carshalton House Water Tower ===
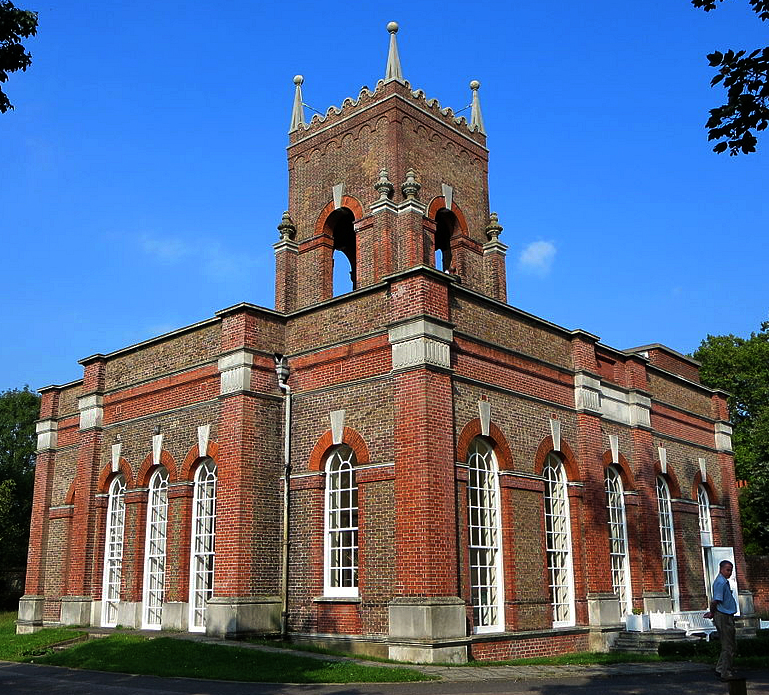
Water Tower, Carshalton House

The Grade II* listed Water Tower (or Bagnio as it was known at the time) was built in the early 18th century, primarily to house a water driven pump supplying water to Carshalton House (now St Philomena's School) and the fountains in its gardens. It was planned as a multi-purpose building, and also contains an orangery, a saloon and a bathroom which retains original Delft tiles. The Water Tower is also surrounded by a garden, which features an 18th-century Hermitage, which was restored in the early 1990s, as well as the rustic-style "Folly Bridge".

=== Little Holland House ===
Little Holland House in Carshalton Beeches was the home of the artist and designer Frank Dickinson (1874–1961). Dickinson's Arts and Crafts style interior was influenced by the writings of John Ruskin and William Morris. The house contains many of his art works. Dickinson built his house between 1902 and 1904, and achieved a unique blend of traditional and Art Nouveau, which has featured in several recent TV series on architectural history. Inside the Grade II listed interior are his hand-made furniture, paintings, interior decoration, carvings and metalwork. Dickinson named his house as a homage to George Frederick Watts, the Victorian artist, sculptor and social campaigner, whose ideals he greatly admired.

The House is now open to members of the public on the first Sunday of every month, plus the Sunday and Monday of Bank Holiday weekends, between 11am and 5pm. Admission is free.

=== The Orangery ===
The Orangery in The Square was built in the second half of the 18th century in Carshalton Park (the section of which between here and Ruskin Road has since been built over). It is thought to have been built by one George Taylor, who owned plantations in the West Indies. By the late 19th century the Orangery was being used a stable. It is now used as office space, for the Environment Agency. It was renovated in 1987 by film actor Oliver Reed (and his son Mark) at his own expense.

=== The Oaks bakehouse ===
The late 19th century bakehouse in Oaks Park is all that remains of "The Oaks" mansion which burned down and was demolished in the 1950s. The original bread oven remains in situ. Blocks of burnt bricks from the ruins of the great house were used by local builders to construct garden walls for houses all along Woodmansterne Road, and may still be seen today.

=== Honeywood Museum ===
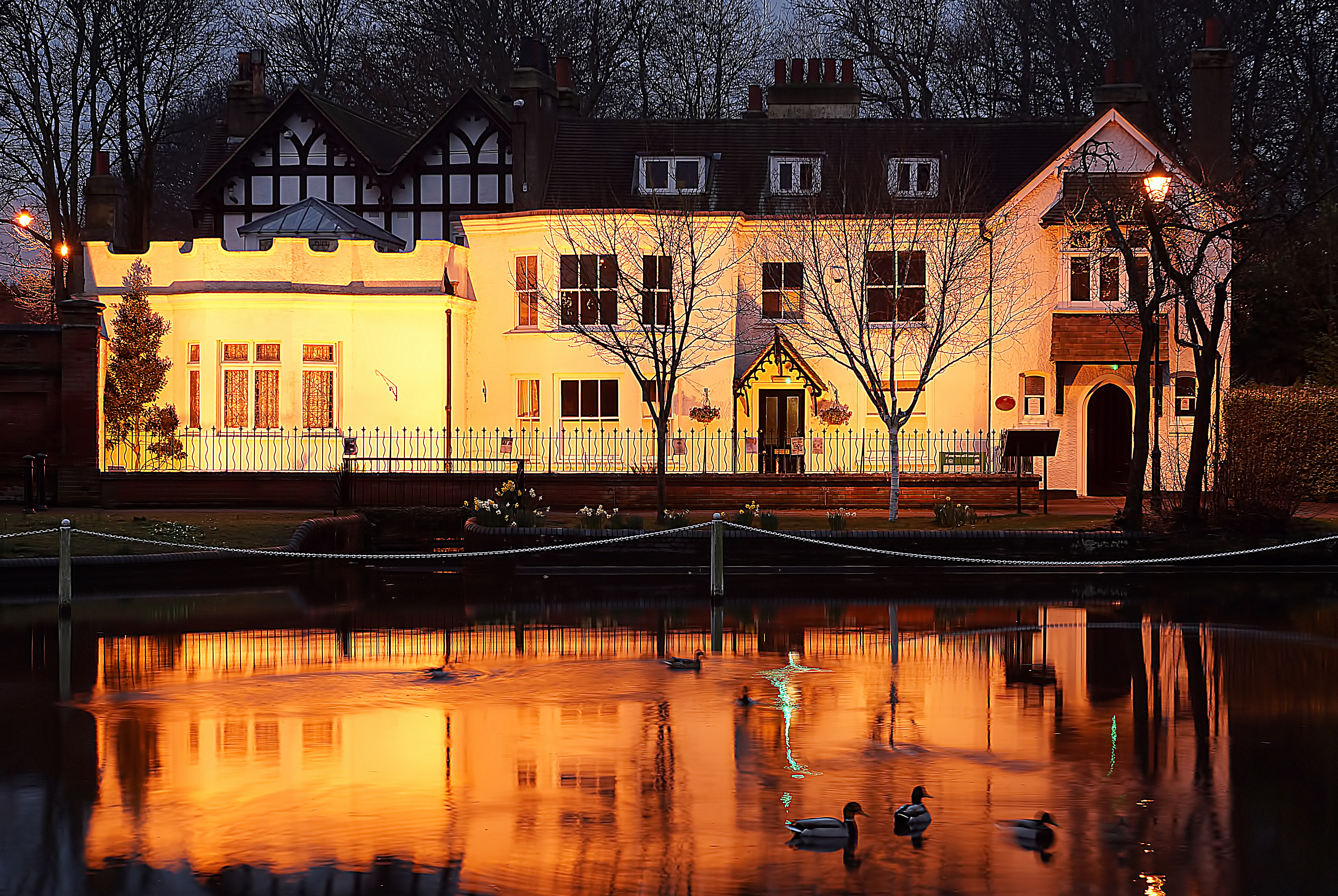
Honeywood House floodlit at night

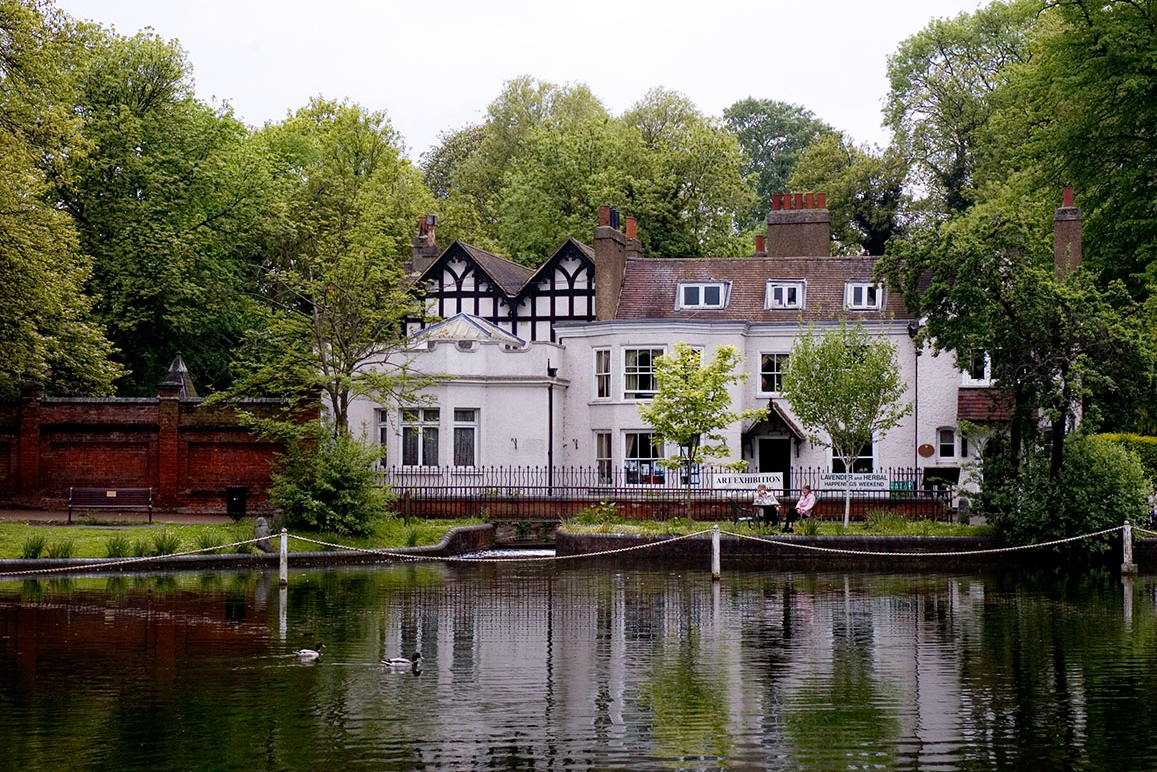
Honeywood House by day

Honeywood is a large Grade II listed house at the western end of the picturesque Carshalton Ponds. At its earliest, it dates from the 17th century but it has been much extended and restored since. In particular, during the period 1896 to 1903 when it was owned by one John Pattinson Kirk, a London merchant, a large Edwardian wing was added to the south side. The 17th century element lies behind the façade in the form of a flint and chalk chequer building. The house now plays host to the London Borough of Sutton's Museum, and has a local history collection, including objects that date back to the Bronze Age. There is a tea room and a shop.

The museum was refurbished, reopening in May 2012 with enhanced features. There are now expanded displays, including an interactive map, about the River Wandle and its influence on the life of the area, and a collection of Edwardian toys on display in the "Childhood Room". The interior was restored to its 1903 colour scheme, and the refurbishment also included a restoration of the Edwardian billiards room, its table and fittings, the drawing Room and the bathroom.

=== Sutton Ecology Centre ===
The Sutton Ecology Centre is located in the Carshalton Village part of Sutton borough. The Grounds are a 1.3 hectare Local Nature Reserve and Site of Borough Importance for Nature Conservation, Grade 1. It is owned by Sutton Council and managed by the Council together with Sutton Nature Conservation Volunteers – SNCV.

It is an area of mainly open space where visitors can find out about wildlife habitats, alternative energy, recycling, composting, and organic gardening. The centre's activities include running educational visits for schools and community groups, as well as events and volunteer days.

The history of the Ecology Centre is that the grounds were until the late eighties known as the "Lodgelands", named after the old gardens of The Lodge in Carshalton. They were used as a tree nursery until the early eighties, when they became surplus to requirements. After a prolonged public debate, it was agreed in 1987 to preserve the area as an open space for public use.

== Parks ==
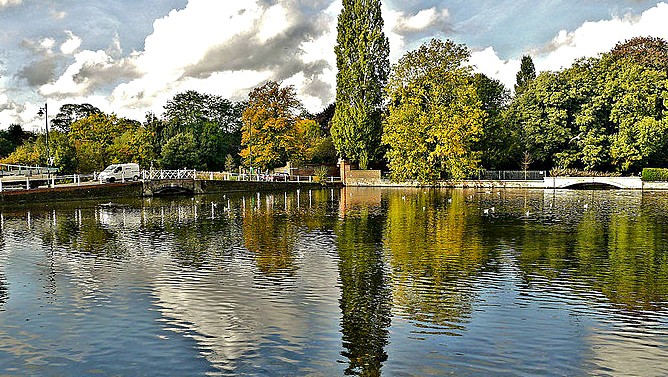
Looking across Lower Pond towards Grove Park

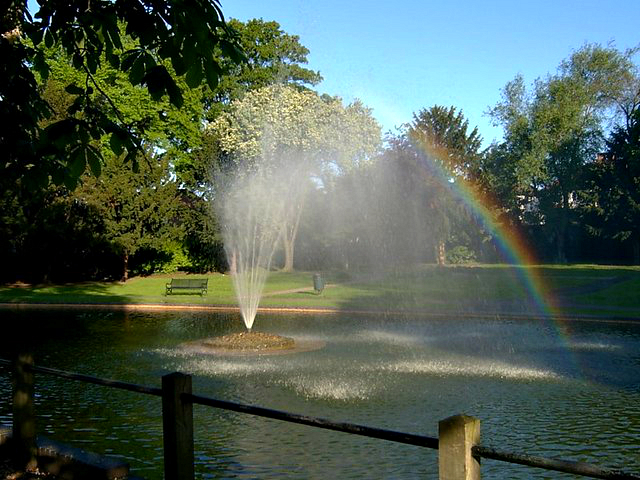
The fountain at Butter Hill

In common with the London Borough of Sutton as a whole, Carshalton has many green spaces, with three of its main public parks worthy of particular note.

=== Carshalton Park ===
The present day Carshalton Park is situated south of the High Street, in the area bounded by Ruskin Road, Ashcombe Road and Woodstock Road. The park and some of the surrounding houses lie within a conservation area. Although much reduced from its original size, it still offers features of historical significance and includes a grotto, the Hog Pit Pond, and a recently rediscovered air raid shelter. Hog Pit is now empty of water, and takes the form of an amphitheatre which is utilised as the main stage for the annual Environmental Fair, which the park plays host to.

=== Grove Park ===
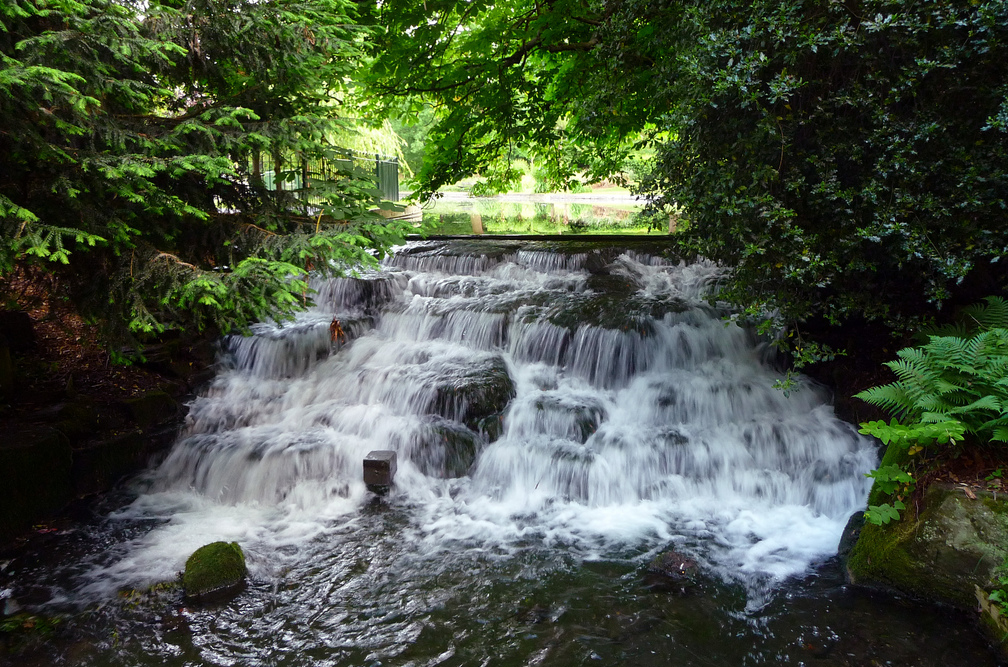
Grove Park Cascade

Grove Park, closest to the village centre, is the best example of a Victorian park in the Borough. It is situated in the area approximately bounded by the High Street, North Street and Mill Lane. The park land was in mediaeval times part of the manor of Stone Court, then consisting mainly of meadows. The manor house was situated at the corner of North Street and Mill Lane. The Grove, including the ornamental gardens, was bought by Carshalton Urban District Council in 1924 and the park was opened to the public a few years later.

The southwest corner of Grove Park lies next to one of Carshalton's ponds (Lower Pond), from whence the River Wandle flows through the park. Among its features of interest is the Leoni Bridge, situated where Grove Park meets the Lower Pond. It is made of white Portland stone. Its name derives from the conjecture that the Venetian architect Giacomo Leoni designed it. Leoni had been commissioned to design a new mansion for Carshalton Park during the early 18th century (although the mansion itself was never constructed). Grove Park also features Grove House, a large early nineteenth house, a watermill and a cascade. The cascade is near the footbridge leading to the Stone Court corner of the park. The 1.5-metre fall is now ornamental in design, but its original purpose was to create a head of water in order to provide power for the nearby "Upper Mill".

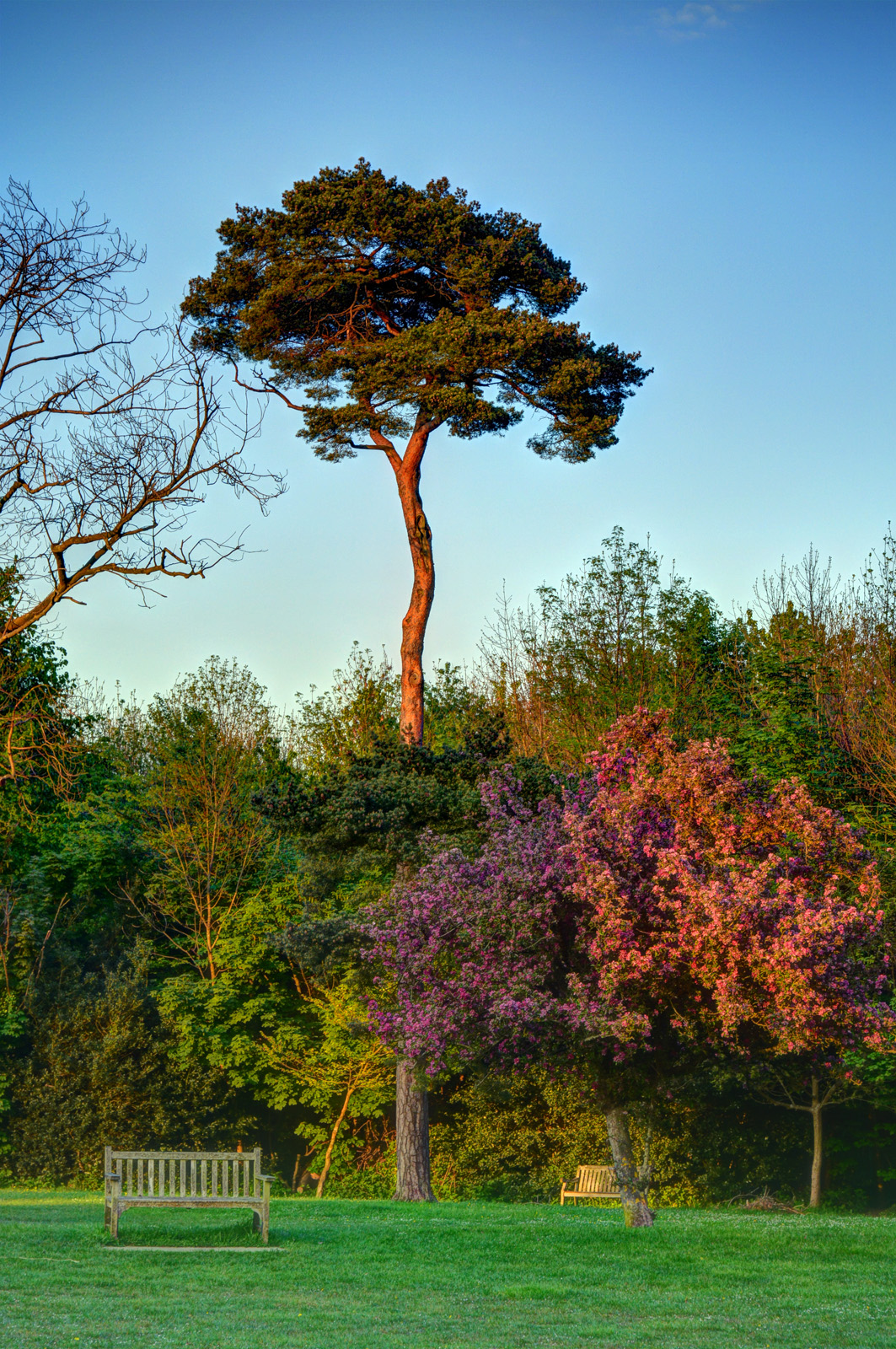
Oaks Park

=== Oaks Park ===
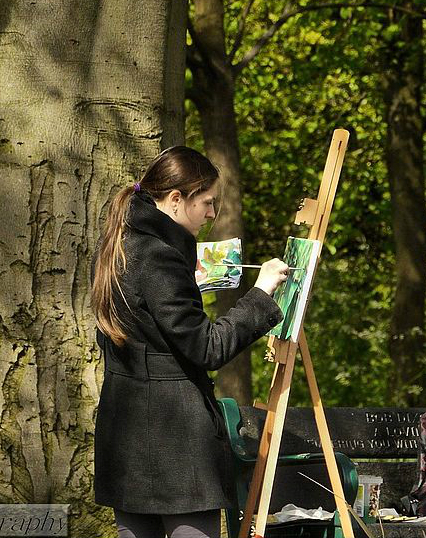
Artist at work in Carshalton

Oaks Park is a large park landscaped in a generally naturalistic style, providing downland walks. It is varied and includes formal horticulture, natural chalk meadows, woodlands and informal parkland. It was substantially laid out for the Earl of Derby nearly 250 years ago – in the 1770s – but its villa dates back further than that. The villa (for one Thomas Gosling) was built around 1750, in the era's fashionable landscape style, with trees forming a perimeter screen and placed in artful clumps to suggest a natural landscape. The house was partly rebuilt by Robert Taylor (architect) for John Burgoyne in 1775 and by Robert Adam for the 12th Earl of Derby in 1790. The villa's bakehouse, stable block and some outbuildings remain to this day.

The Oaks Park estate lent its name to the Oaks horse-race which was inaugurated by the Earl in 1779, and is run annually during the Derby meeting at Epsom Downs Racecourse, about 4 miles to the west. The original Oaks Race ran from Barrow Hedges, north of The Oaks and through Oaks Park before heading west to approximately the site of the current Epsom Downs Racecourse. Part of the off-road route still exists.

The modern day open space also hosts a public golf course and sports centre. The park itself contains a craft-centre and a café. There are also the Oaks Park Studios set in the 1770 stable block, where working artists display their paintings and other artwork.

== Events ==
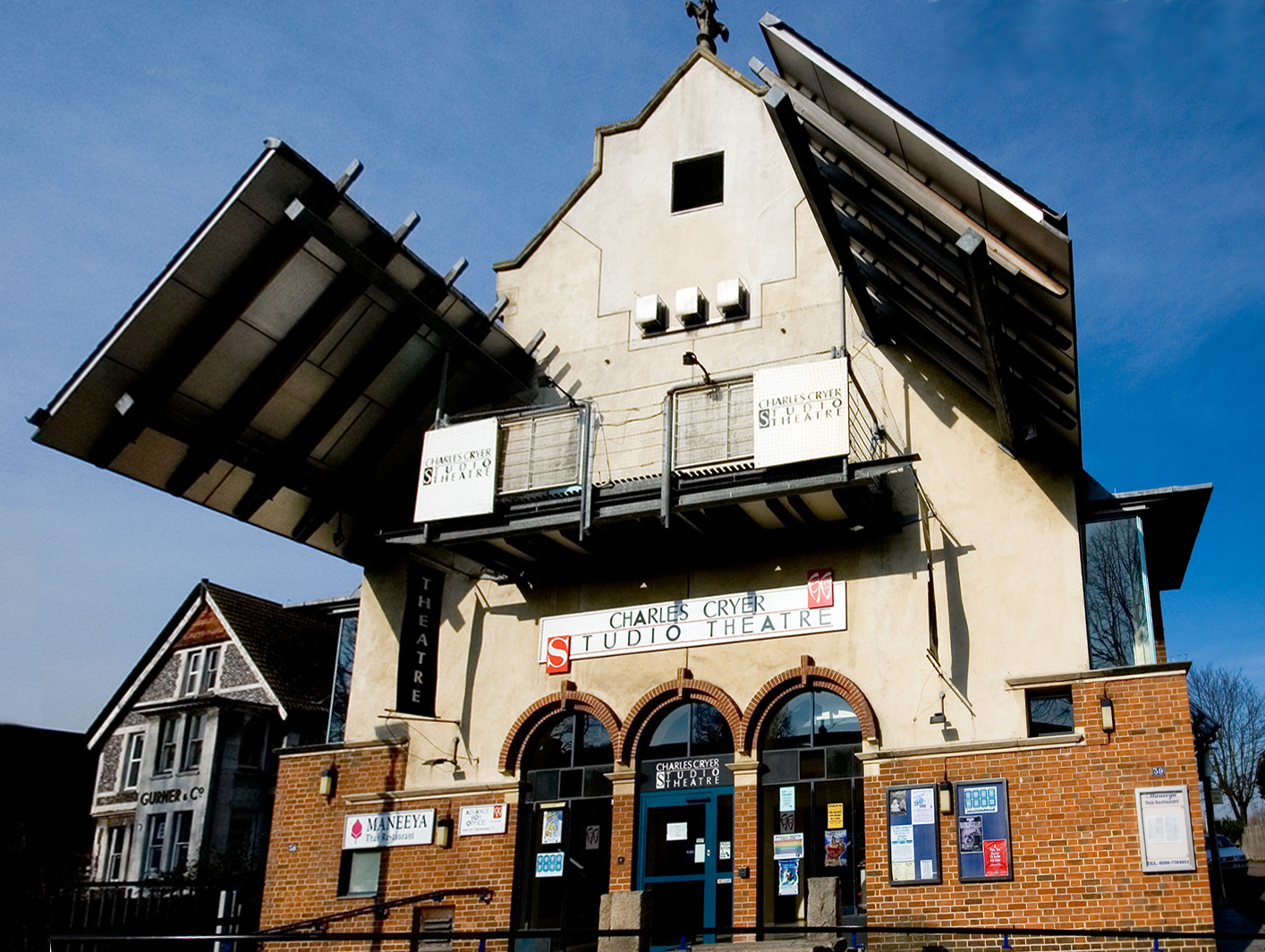
Charles Cryer Theatre

=== Charles Cryer Theatre ===
The Charles Cryer Theatre is situated on Carshalton High Street, within walking distance of Carshalton and Carshalton Beeches railway stations (Carshalton station is the nearer of the two). The theatre opened in the early 1990s on the site of a former public hall as part of the then "Arts in Carshalton" campaign coordinated by the local council. The theatre is named after the man who led the campaign to open the Secombe Theatre in neighbouring Sutton. As well as drama and musicals, productions include comedy and dance: past material has included Shakespeare and Chekov on the one hand and pantomime on the other, in order to balance popularity with quality. The theatre also serves as a concert venue for local bands and has played host to the local Rockshot festival. The theatre building also incorporates a Thai restaurant.

The theatre closed in 2016 and was subsequently put out to lease. At a meeting in October 2018, the local council announced that the theatre would be brought back into use, following a successful bid to run the venue (on a 25-year lease) by Cryer Arts Ltd. The company plans a range of events, including music, film and theatre.

=== Carshalton Environmental Fair ===
The Environmental Fair is held in Carshalton Park on August Bank Holiday Monday. It features over 100 stalls and showcases local sustainability initiatives. It also includes music, performing art, poetry, children's activities, campaign groups, local craft, interactive demonstrations, and a farmers' market. Music is performed from three stages and includes rock and folk. The main stage is a natural open-air amphitheatre. There is food and a bar with real ales. The fair attracts on average around 10,000 people. It is organised by EcoLocal with a team of volunteers.

=== Other events ===
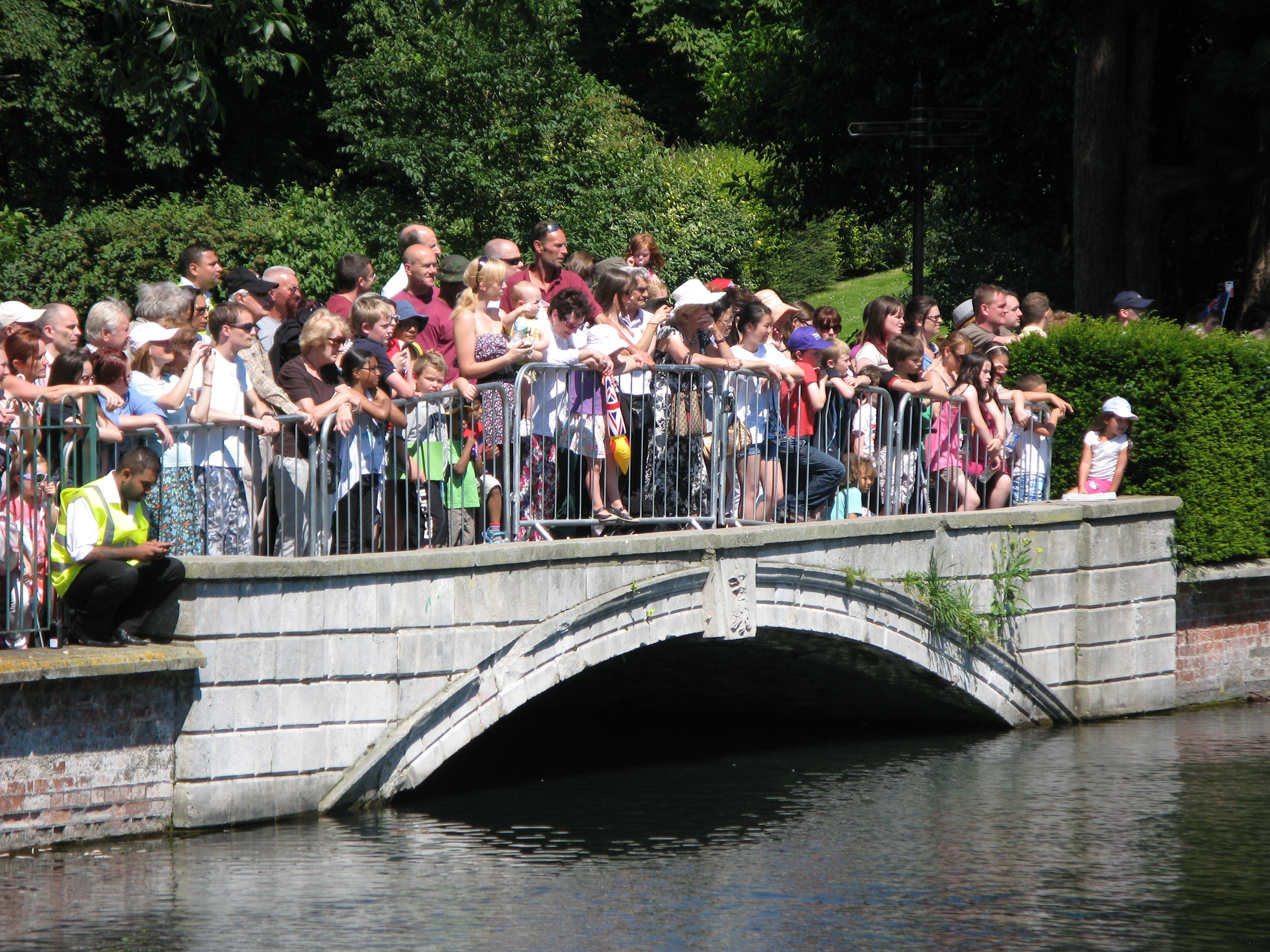
Spectators on the Leoni Bridge at the 2012 Olympic torch relay in Carshalton Village

Other annual events include the Carshalton Fireworks a charity fireworks display at Carshalton Park on the Saturday nearest to Guy Fawkes Night, a summer carnival on the second Saturday of June, a beer festival over the first Bank Holiday weekend in May, and Carshalton Charter fair held in September.

The Ecology Centre and Honeywood Museum also hold regular events and meetings.

The Methodist hall in Ruskin Road is home to the Ruskin Players and the Carshalton Choral Society, both of which perform at regular intervals throughout the year.

The annual Carshalton Lavender harvest weekend is held in July, at Stanley Park Allotments, Carshalton-on-the-Hill.

== Economy ==
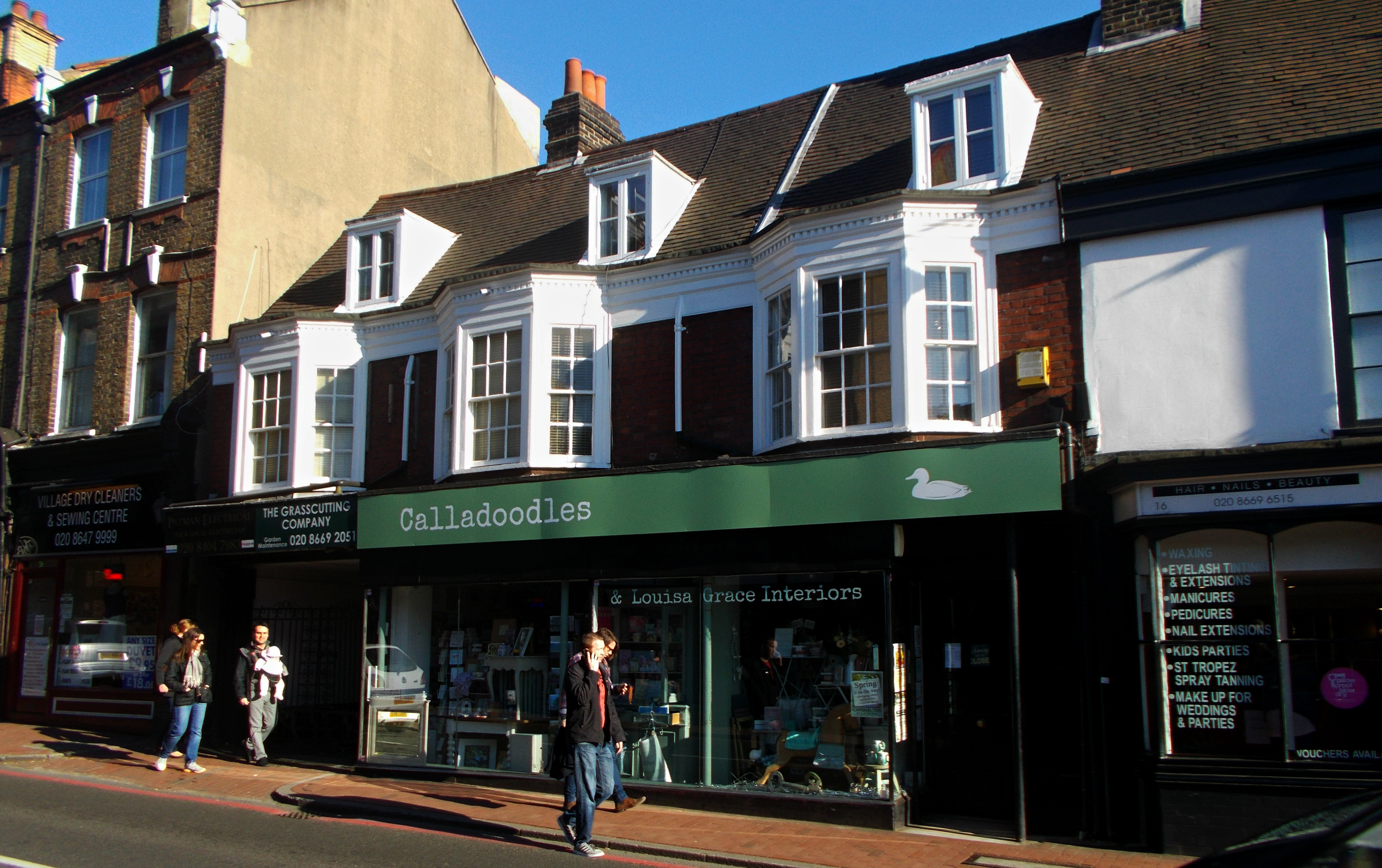
Niche shops in Carshalton High Street

A number of businesses and organisations are based in Carshalton, such as the Institute of Refrigeration.

Retailing also forms a significant part of the local economy. There are number of separate shopping areas, with the small network of streets in Carshalton Village the main one.

The Village contains a variety of mainly independent establishments, including an art gallery, gift stores, clock dealers, antique shops, niche shops, coffee houses, pubs and restaurants. In 2014 The Hope public house in West Street in Carshalton Village reached the Top Four of all pubs in the UK, according to CAMRA.

In Carshalton Beeches, half-a-mile to the south-east of the Village, there is a further shopping area, situated along a 300-yard stretch of the otherwise residential Beeches Avenue. Retail outlets in Beeches Avenue include an art gallery, a chocolatier, gift shops and hair and beauty salons.

== Transport ==
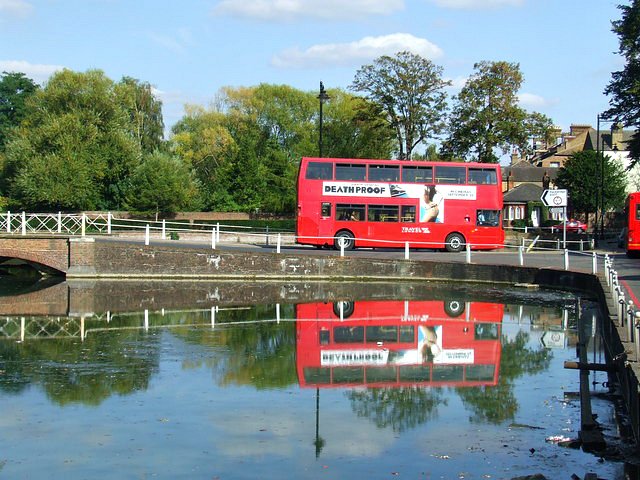
Bus crossing the Carshalton ponds

Carshalton has two railway stations: Carshalton and Carshalton Beeches. From 1847 to the opening of the current Carshalton in 1868 Wallington railway station was named Carshalton. Trains run from the current Carshalton to Victoria (in around 25 minutes), London Bridge and Thameslink stations including Blackfriars, Farringdon and Kings Cross St Pancras.

The closest London Underground station is Morden.

Bus services 127, 157, 407, 627 and SL7 also serve the High Street.

Carshalton is on a section of the National Cycle Network (Route 20). A leisure trail along the River Wandle from Wandsworth is available from the Sustrans website.

== Notable residents ==
The borough-related individuals particularly related to Carshalton are as follows:

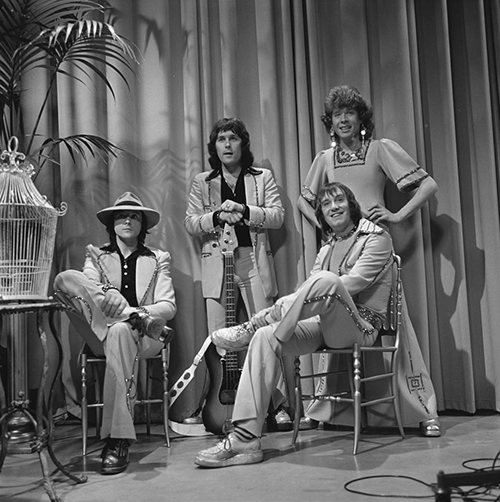
Les Gray and Rob Davis of Mud, standing, with fellow band members

- Harry Aikines-Aryeetey, athlete, attended Greenshaw High School
- Terry and Jonathan Austen, creators of the Empire of Austenasia (a micronation)
- Aggie Beever-Jones, footballer for Chelsea
- Mark Bridger, child murderer serving a whole life order.
- Jack Cork, footballer for Burnley FC
- Carl Cox, house and techno club DJ, spent his early life in Carshalton
- Pauline Boty, artist
- Roger Bowles, cricketer
- Paul Burstow, MP for Sutton and Cheam
- Rob Davis, lead guitarist of Mud
- Sir John Fellowes, 1st Baronet (1671–1724), of the South Sea Company
- Les Gray, lead vocalist of Mud
- Sir John Major, former Conservative Prime Minister
- David Mitchell, cricketer
- Dave Mount, drummer of Mud
- Dr John Radcliffe, royal physician and MP
- Sir Cliff Richard, singer and songwriter, attended Stanley Park Junior School
- Sir William Scawen, merchant who purchased Carshalton manor
- Joanna Rowsell Shand, Olympic gold medallist in pursuit cycling
- Tim Smith, musician, composer and leader of Cardiacs, and brother Jim Smith were born here
- Sarah Tullamore, actress and singer
- Alison Weir, novelist and historian
- Jack Rudoni, Coventry City footballer

== Education ==
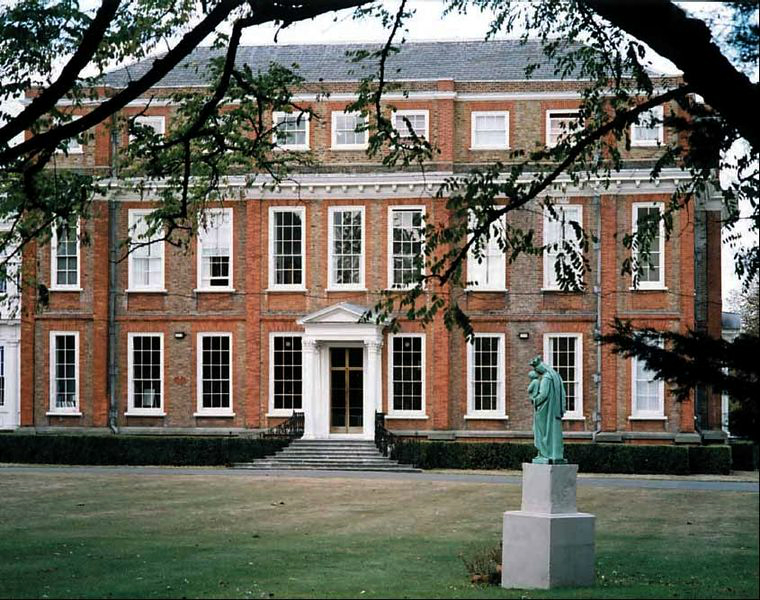
St Philomena's School

There are a number of primary schools and secondary schools as well as one college in Carshalton. These are listed below.

=== Primary schools ===
- All Saints, CofE, Carshalton Primary
- Barrow Hedges Primary
- Harris Junior Academy Carshalton
- Muschamp Primary
- Rushy Meadow
- St Mary's RC Junior School
- Stanley Park Infants
- Stanley Park Junior
- Victor Seymour Infants

=== Secondary schools ===
- St Philomena's School
- Carshalton High School for Girls
- Carshalton Boys Sports College
- Oaks Park High School

=== Further education ===
- Carshalton College

== Sport and leisure ==
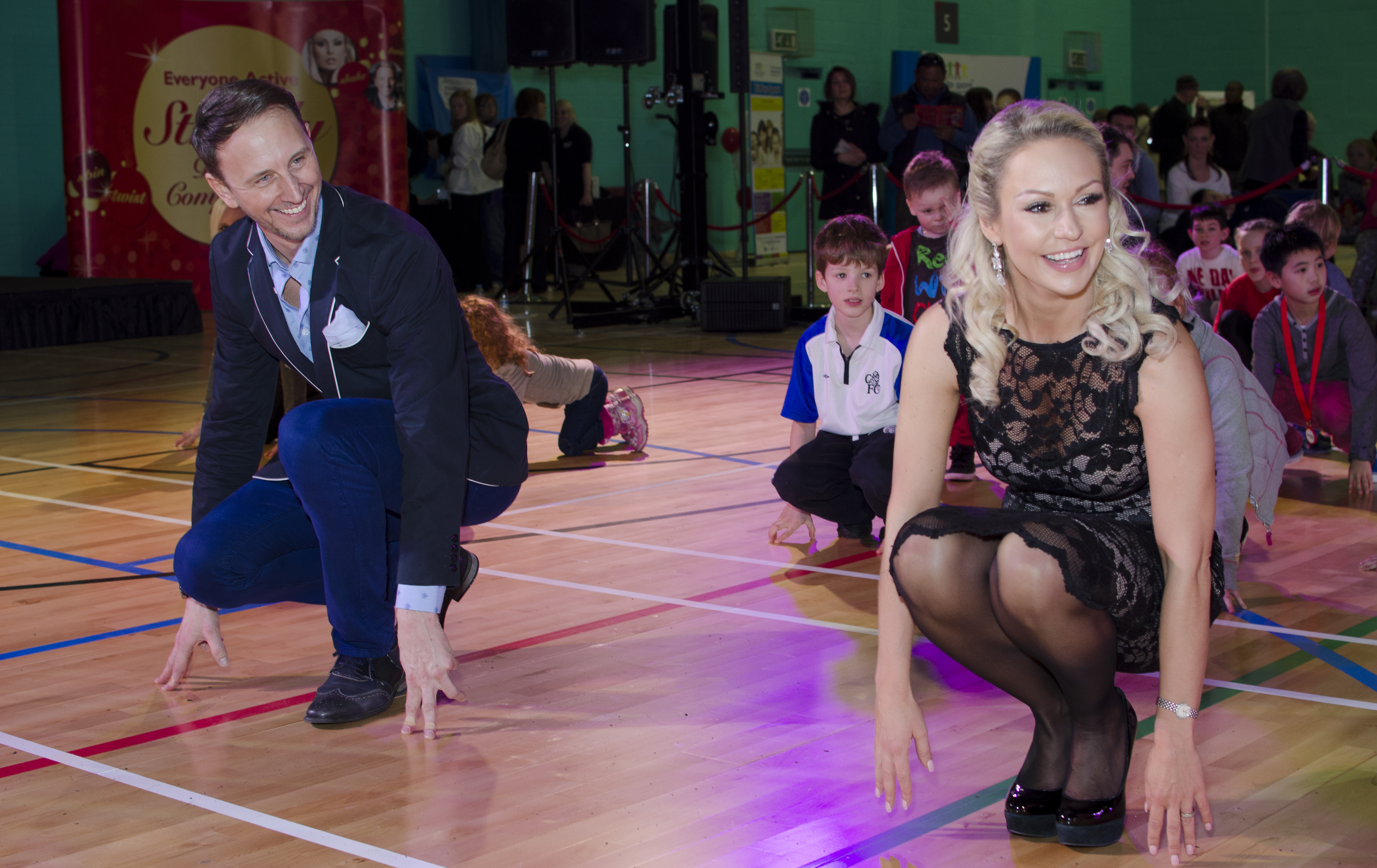
Ian Waite and Kristina Rihanoff get involved with the 'Everyone Active Strictly Come Dancing Competition' group warm up at the Grand Opening of the new Westcroft Leisure Centre

Carshalton has two football clubs: Carshalton Athletic F.C. (home ground at The War Memorial Sports Ground, Colston Avenue) and Carshalton FC (at Beddington Park).

At the Westcroft Leisure Centre in Grove Park, Carshalton, there are health and fitness facilities including two swimming pools one being a teaching pool. In 2012 Westcroft underwent a major renovation costing £11 million, bringing improved swimming facilities, dance and spinning studios and beauty treatment rooms. There are eight courts in the sports hall, providing facilities for activities including badminton, gymnastics, trampolining, basketball, football, netball and volleyball. In April 2013 the centre was shortlisted for the LABC London Regional Building Excellence Awards.

== Notes and references ==
Notes
