= Benjamin Hill =

Benjamin, Ben or Benny Hill may refer to:

== People ==
- Benjamin Harvey Hill (1823–1882), U.S. politician for the state of Georgia
- Benjamin J. Hill (1825–1880), Confederate States Army brigadier general during the American Civil War, merchant and lawyer
- Benjamín G. Hill (1874–1920), Mexican military commander during the Mexican Revolution
- Ben A. Hill (1892–1976), California politician
- Ben Hill Griffin Jr. (1910–1990), American businessman, citrus grower, politician and philanthropist
- Ben Hill (baseball) (born 1916), American baseball player
- Benny Hill (born Alfred Hawthorn Hill, 1924–1992), British comedian and star of The Benny Hill Show
- Benjamin Mako Hill (born 1980), American open source software developer and author
- Ben Hill (cyclist) (born 1990), Australian cyclist

== Places ==
- Benhill, a council housing estate in Sutton, South London
- Ben Hill County, Georgia, a county in the southern portion of the U.S. state of Georgia
- Ben Hill, Atlanta, a neighborhood in Atlanta, Georgia
- Benjamín Hill, Sonora, a Mexican municipality and municipal seat

== See also ==
- Ben Hills (1942–2018), Walkley Award-winning Australian freelance journalist and author
- Bennies Hill Road Bridge, steel bowstring arch bridge over Catoctin Creek near Middletown, Maryland, USA
- Hill (surname)
