= Conservation areas in Sutton, London =

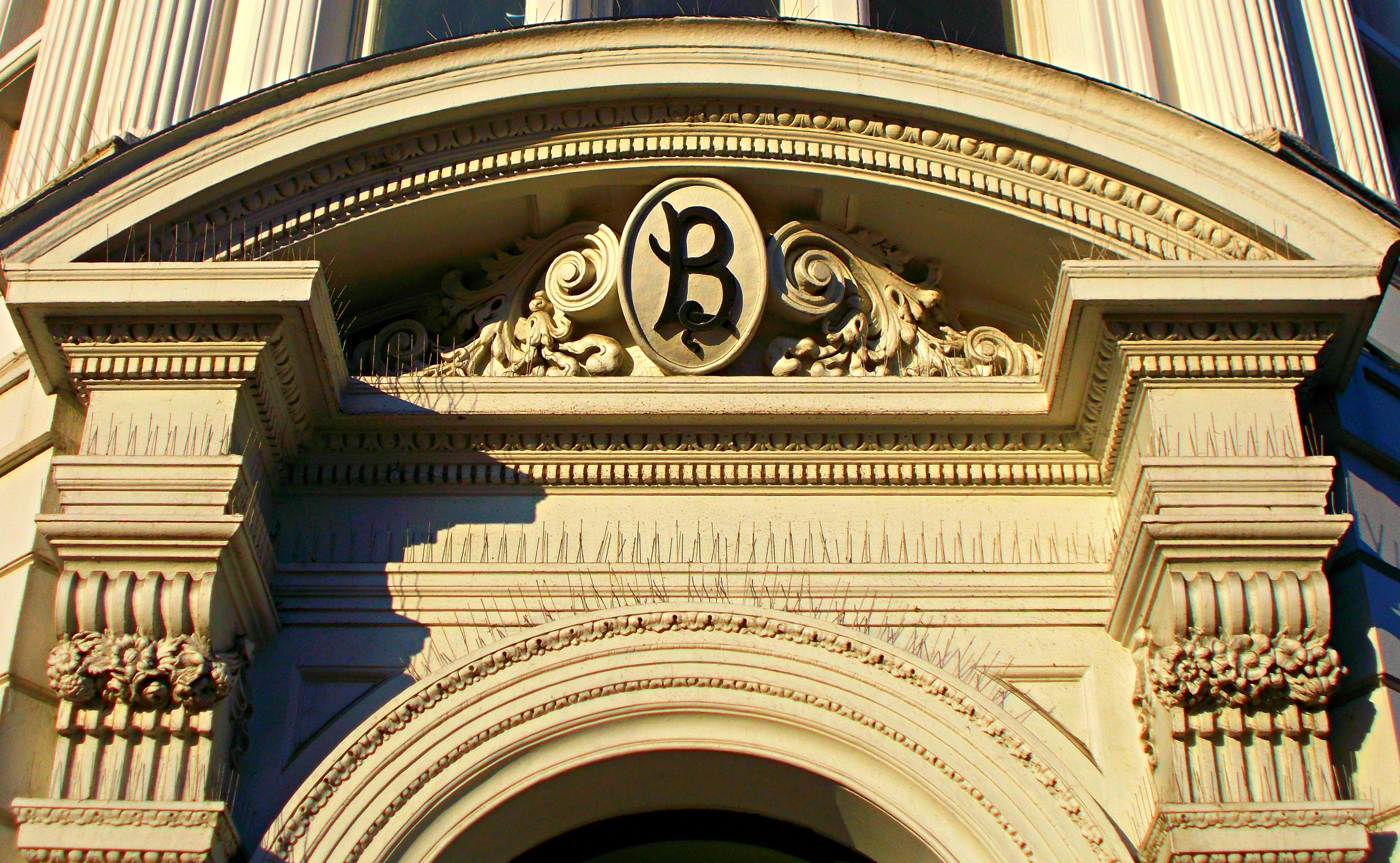
- The ornate architrave and segmental pediment surrounding the entrance to the Barclay's Bank building in Sutton High Street
- Interactive map of Conservation areas in Sutton, London
- 51.361191°N 0.192188°W
- Location: Sutton, London Borough of Sutton

There are four conservation areas within the town of Sutton (among several others across the whole of the London Borough of Sutton). One of these is in Sutton town centre – the Sutton Town Centre High Street Crossroads Conservation Area – while the other three are residential: Grove Avenue, Landseer Road and the Sutton Garden Suburb.

The High Street features "vivid, Victorian, polychrome brick and stone façades", Grove Avenue displays modernist and half-timbered houses, Landseer Road is an area of large, finely detailed, Edwardian villa houses and Sutton Garden Suburb is a member of the garden city movement.

== Sutton Town Centre High Street Crossroads Conservation Area ==
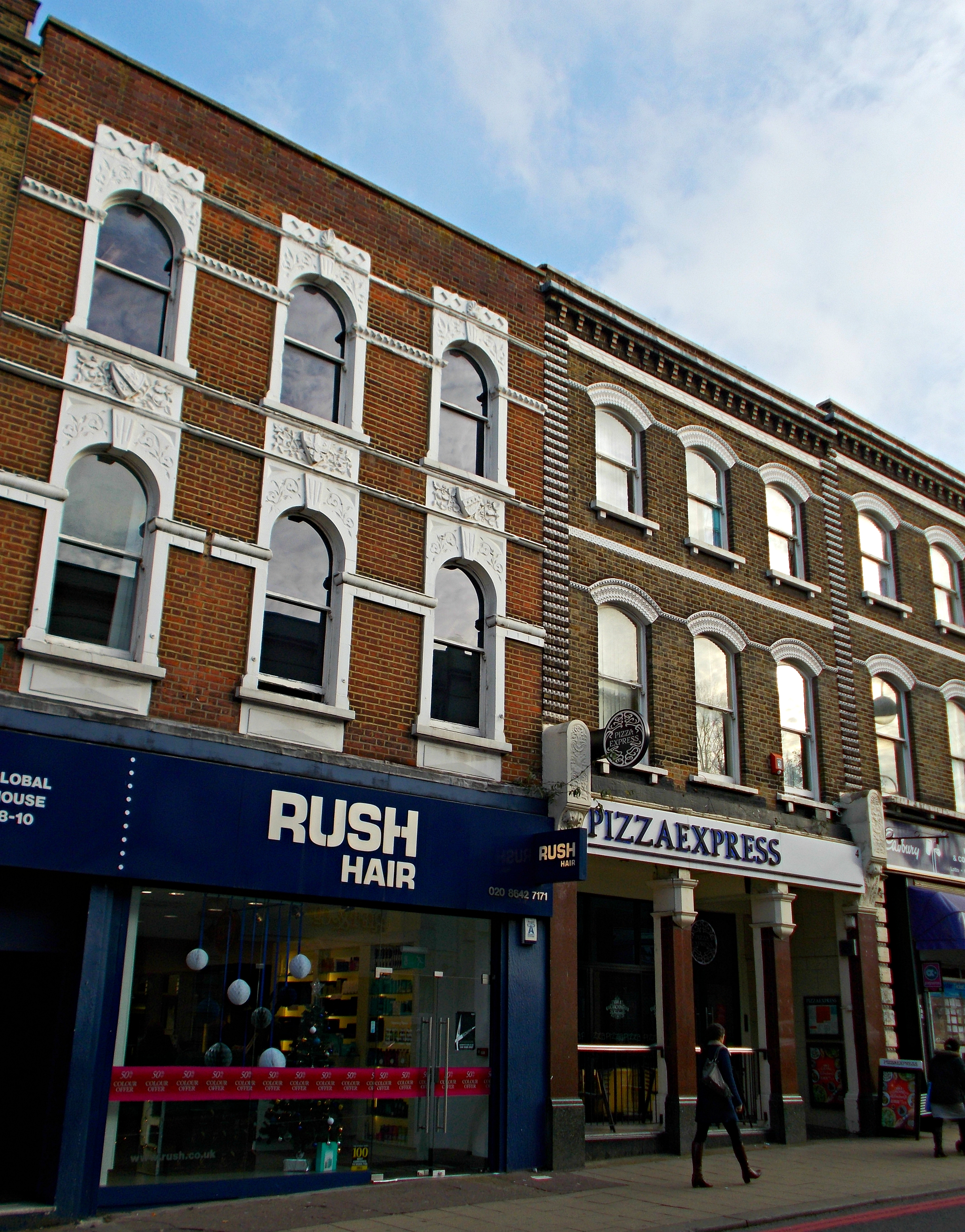
Sutton High Street within the conservation area

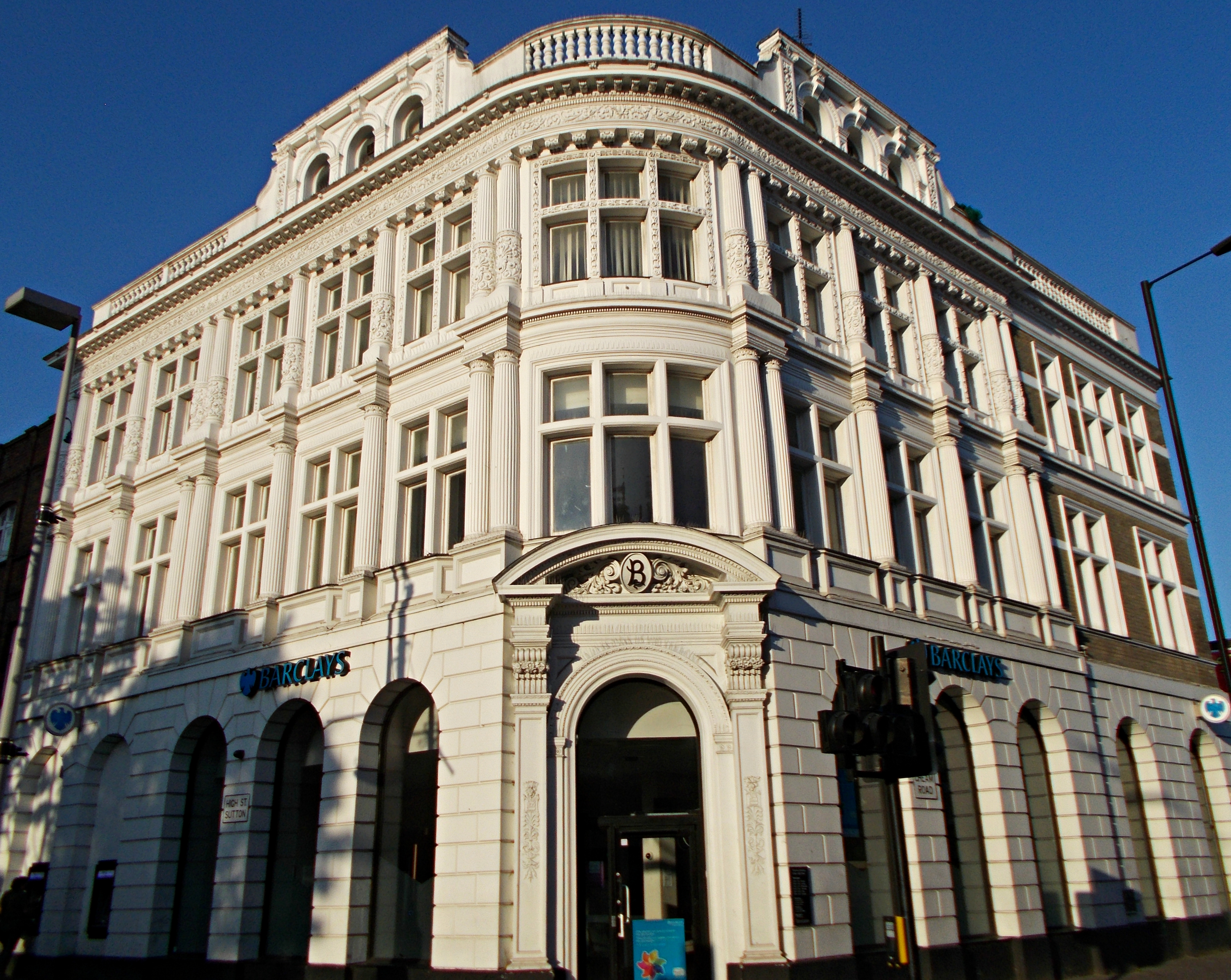
The façade of the Barclays Bank building in the Town Centre High St Crossroads Conservation Area

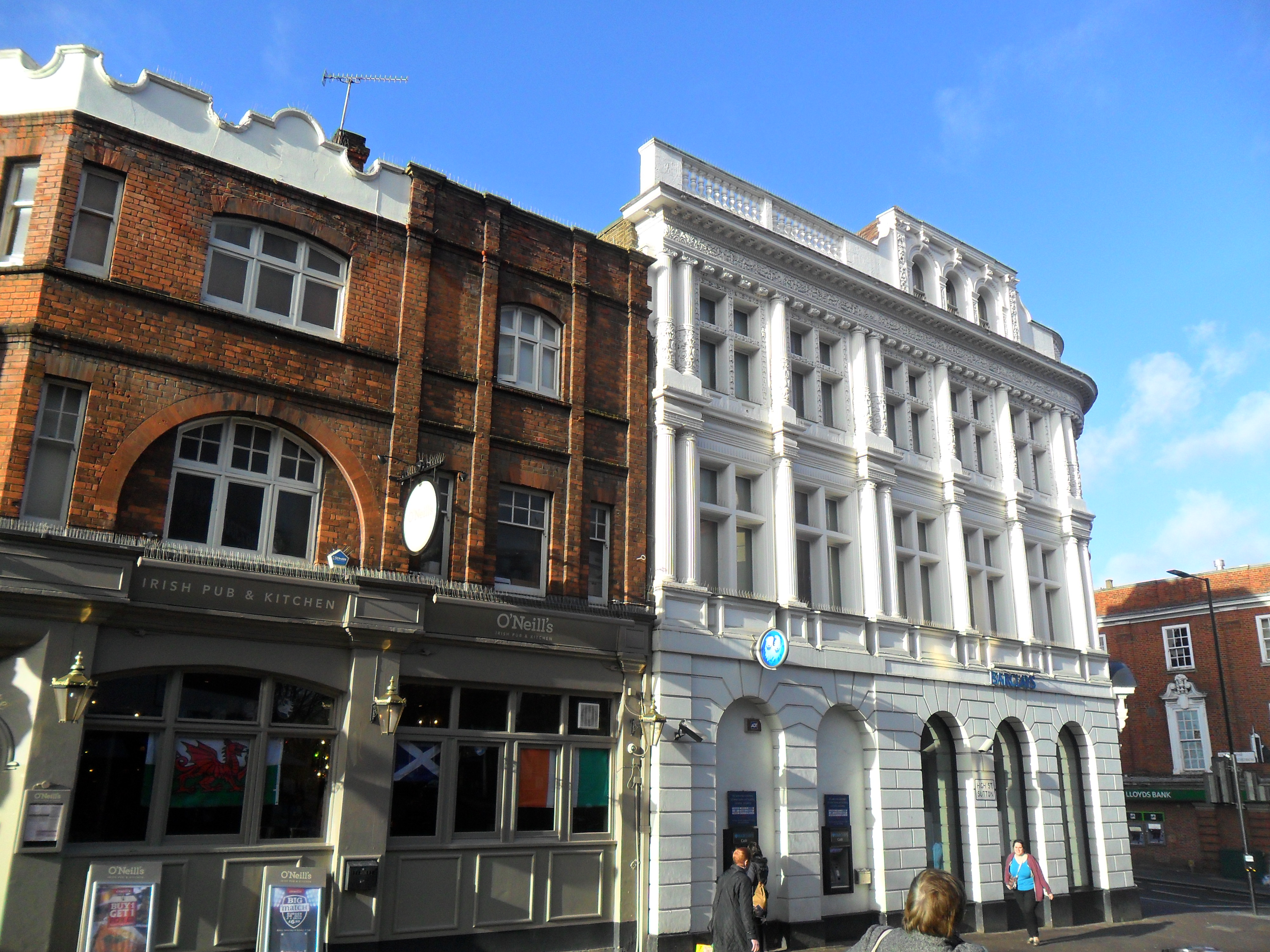
Sutton High Street within the conservation area

The Sutton Town Centre High Street Crossroads Conservation Area was designated on 9 May 2011, following a review of the town centre, which highlighted the historic importance of the highway network at the crossroads of Cheam Road/Carshalton Road and Sutton High Street, as well as the associated buildings and spaces. The Conservation Area focuses on the area around the historic crossroads, and stretches from the station down to Trinity Square. It also takes in part of Grove Road, in particular the late 19th century masonic hall. It includes two churches, Sutton Baptist Church and Trinity Church. The Carshalton Road section includes the Edwardian era police station. The local authority noted that the buildings, especially their upper storeys, were worthy of preservation and enhancement. Its report concluded that conservation status was warranted on the basis of the historic importance of the area together with its architectural and aesthetic merit. The designation would enable the provision of guidance to landowners and developers on maintaining and improving the historic aspects of the area.

Gordon Rookledge in his "Sutton Architectural Identifier" remarks on the "vivid, Victorian, polychrome brick and stone façades" in his description of Sutton High Street.

=== Heritage Action Zone ===
In March 2017, it was announced that Sutton town centre had been designated one of the first ten Heritage Action Zones by Historic England. Gaining this status will unlock resources to enhance the historic environment, including the conservation area, with the aim of encouraging economic growth. Heritage will be made a central consideration for new developments in the area, so as to retain the town's distinct architectural nature.

== Landseer Road Conservation Area ==
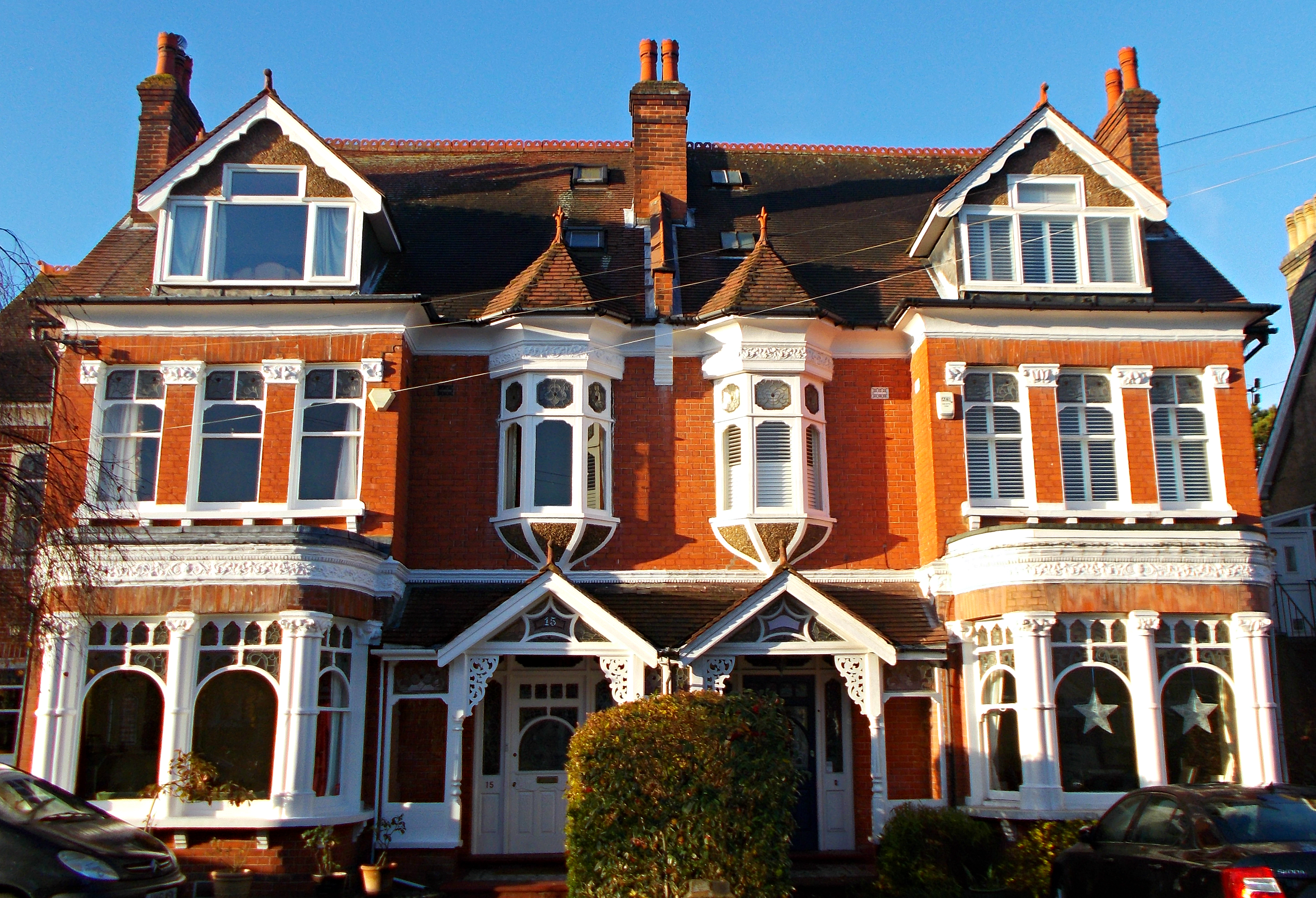

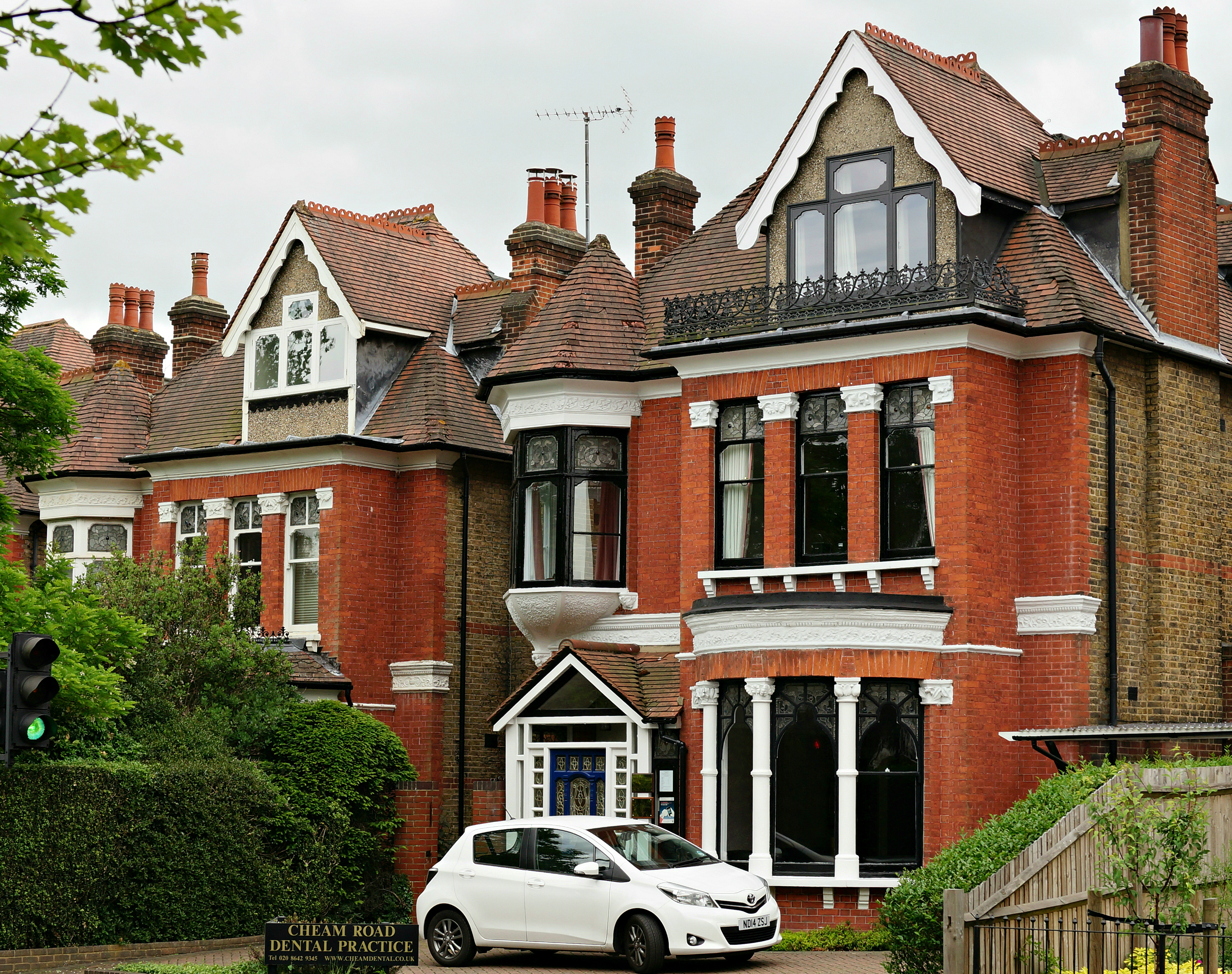
Landseer Road Conservation Area: ornate Edwardian homes in Bridgefield Road (above); and Cheam Rd (below)

Landseer Road Conservation Area includes Landseer Road itself plus all or most of the nearby Bridgefield Road, York Road, Derby Road, Rosebery Road, Cecil Road and Salisbury Avenue; and short sections of Cheam Road and Grove Road. It was designated in 1992, is nine hectares in size, comprises 138 properties, and is located between Sutton town centre and Cheam Village. Most of the houses are large detached villas. The grandeur of the houses is a notable feature of the area, which is surrounded by mature trees and grass verges.

The development of these roads began in the late nineteenth century and was fully completed in 1913. The roads are lined with, according to Gordon Rookledge, the "finest, detailed Edwardian detached and semi-detached houses" in Sutton Borough.

== The Sutton Garden Suburb Conservation Area ==
The Sutton Garden Suburb is in Benhilton in north Sutton. Inspired by the Arts and Crafts movement, it was the first of the Sutton conservation areas to be designated as such, in 1989. Thomas Wall, famous for his sausages and ice cream, developed the Sutton Garden Suburb between 1912 and 1914. This suburb contributed to the garden city movement that was originally conceived by Ebenezer Howard and was similar to the development of the Hampstead Garden Suburb in north London.

Designed by Frederick Cavendish Pearson for Rose Hill Park Limited, which sold out its rights in 1913 to Sutton Garden Suburb Limited, it has an integrated house and landscape design, some secreted around small greens and others along well-planted avenues. The original plans would have provided for 1,000 houses, to be built around greens and woods including a recreation ground and a clubhouse for members of the Suburb.

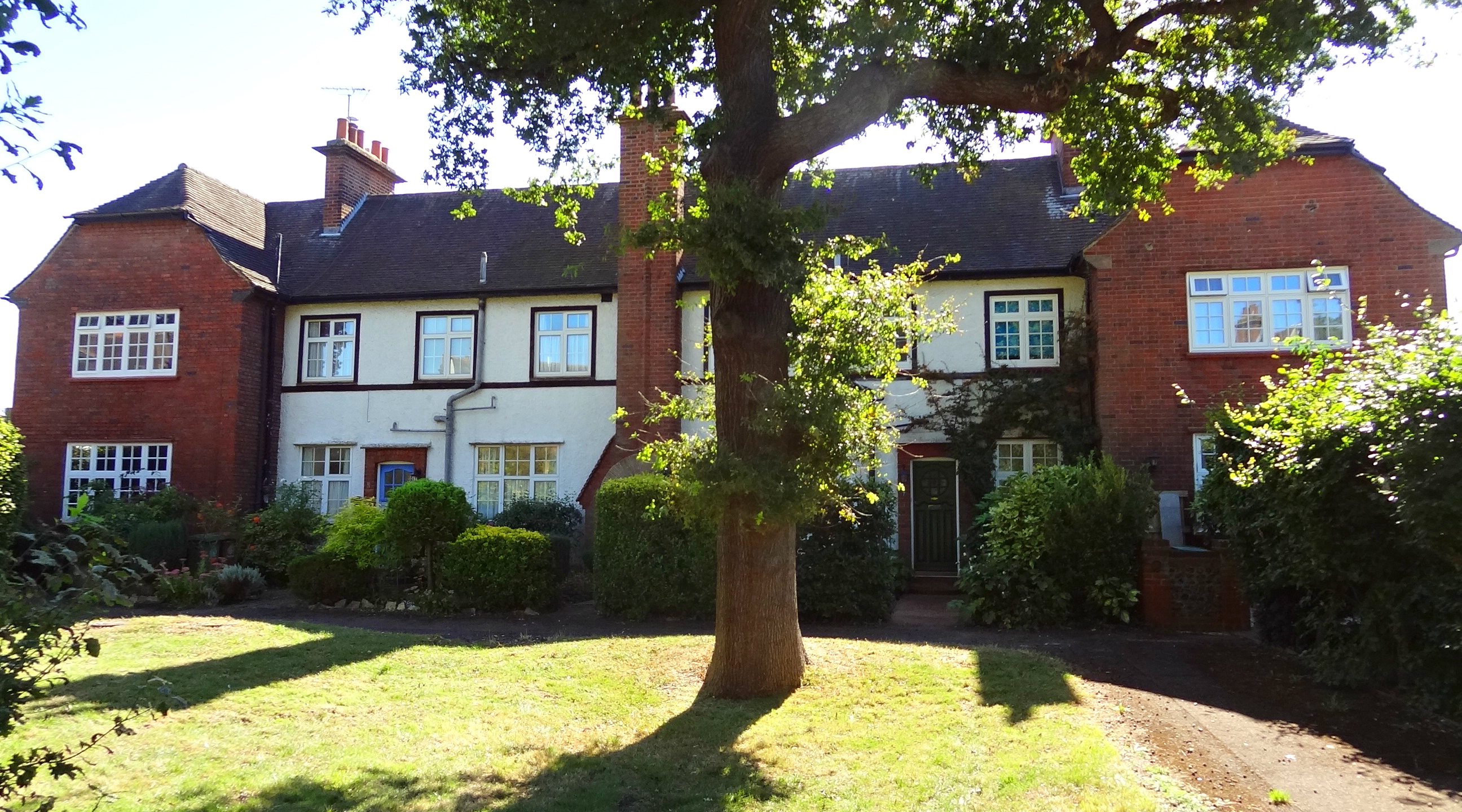
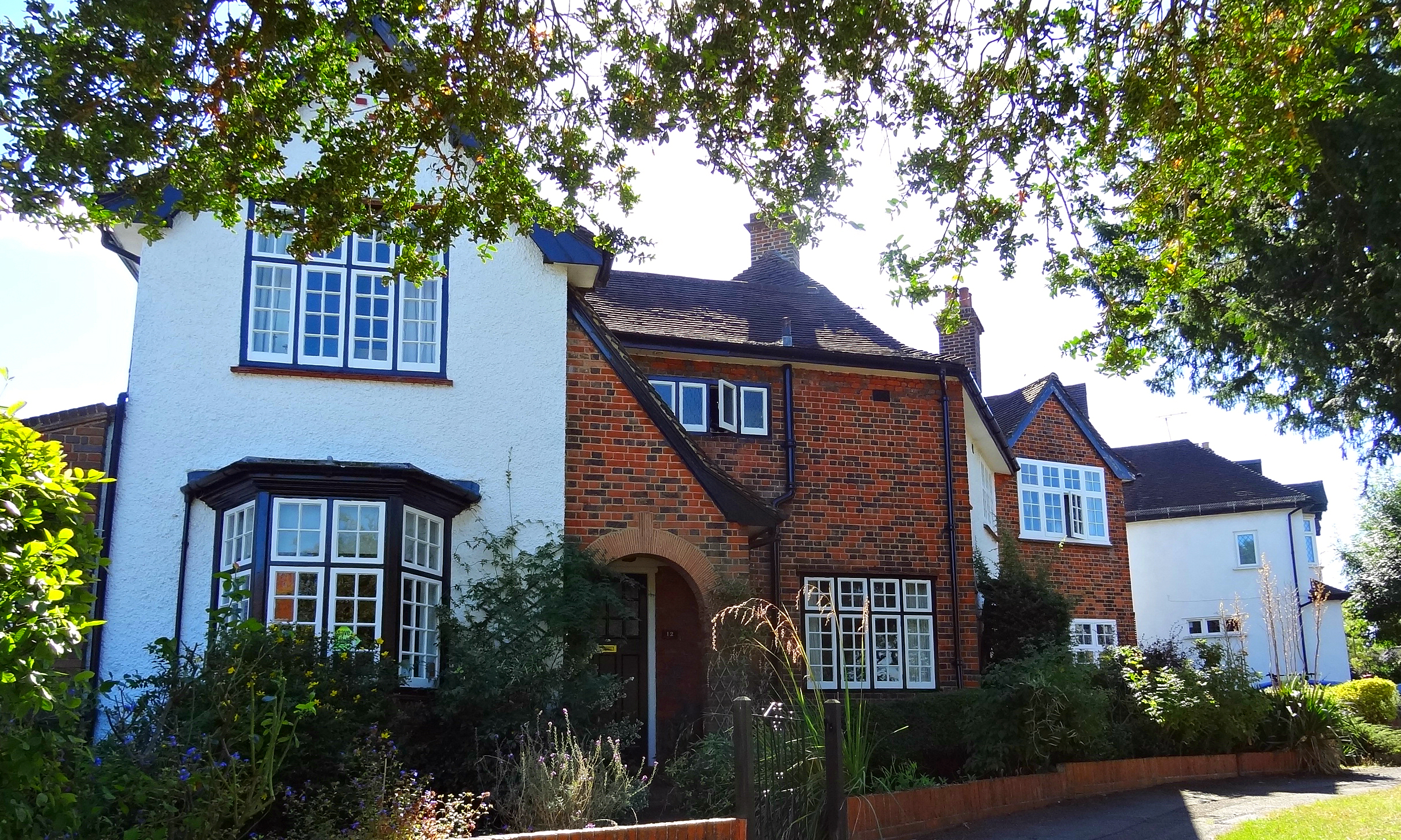

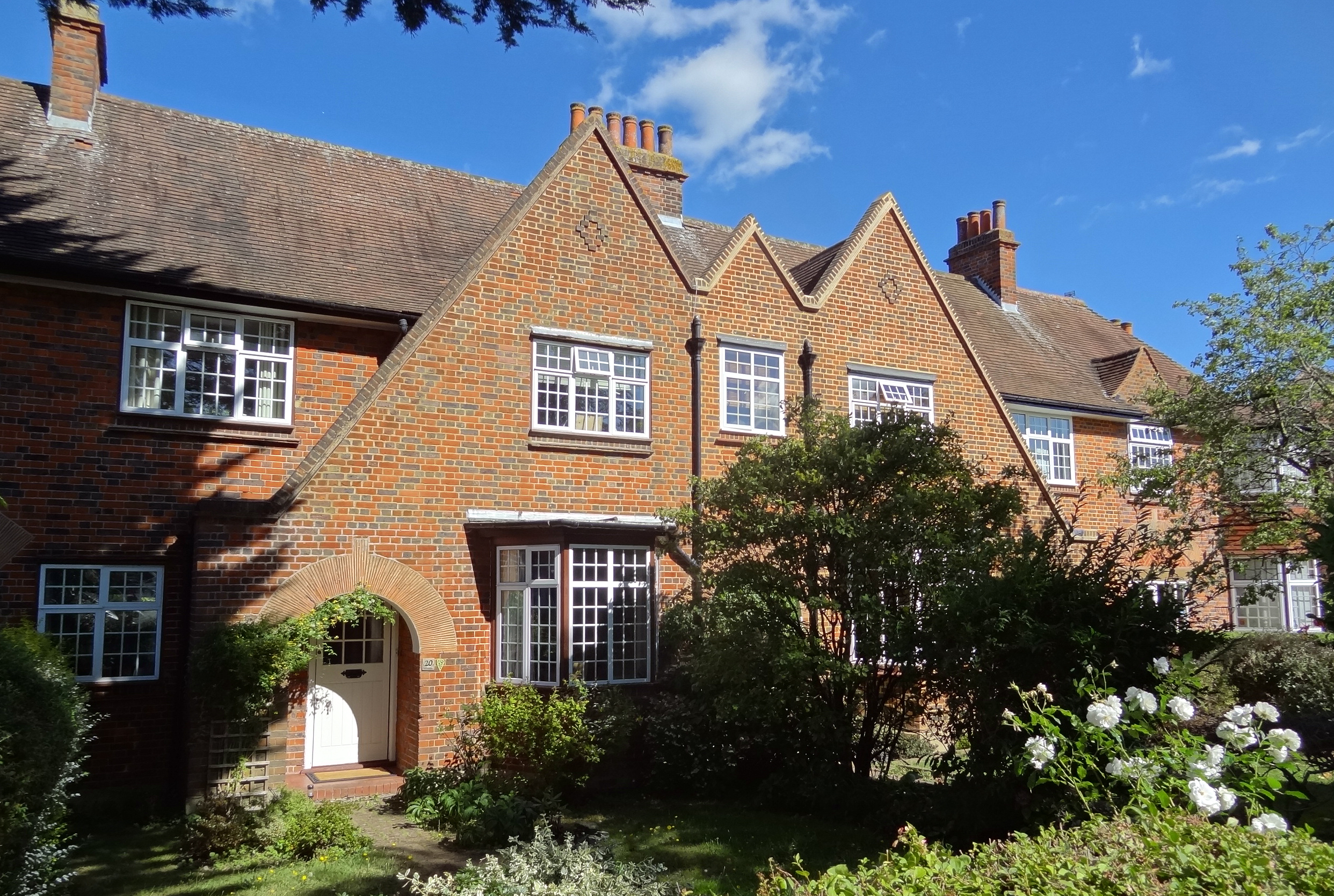
The Sutton Garden Suburb Conservation Area: Oak Close (above); and Woodend (bottom two)

Tennis courts and a clubhouse were in fact built at the centre of the Suburb, and the remnant of a post of one of the courts was located on the land, but during the Second World War most of the land was put to use as a victory garden instead. Local residents continued to use the land as allotments until they were evicted by the then landowner in 1997. The Sutton Garden Suburb Residents Association was formed soon after, principally to oppose residential development of the site. The land became derelict before planning permission was granted in March 2023 for nine new houses to be built on the site, together with open space, a pond and allotment plots. The site is designated as Urban Green Space.

The first houses to be built were at Oak Close, followed by Meadow Close, Hawthorne Close and Horseshoe Green. Between 1912 and 1914, 79 houses to Cavendish's plans and elevations had been started on site. Houses in Woodend were started in 1914, and in 1915 a further 55 houses were under construction in Greenhill and Aultone Way, with footings already set out. However, Sutton Garden Suburb Limited failed to obtain permission from the Local Government Board to borrow further money in the winter of 1914. The government also intervened and put a stop to all house building in 1915 following the outbreak of the First World War. After the war, financial difficulties meant that the remaining plots envisaged for development were sold off to local builders for as little as £2 per footing. This is visually evident in the different styles of housing in the area, with most of the semi-detached properties and bungalows being built on those plots waiting to be developed before the First World War. Cavendish Pearson was later employed by private individuals to design houses in the Suburb, and notably became involved in designing the nearby St Helier estate for London County Council. Cavendish Pearson is known to have lived at two houses he designed in the Suburb, 12 Woodend in 1914–15, and 20 Meadow Close from 1920–63.

== Grove Avenue Conservation Area ==
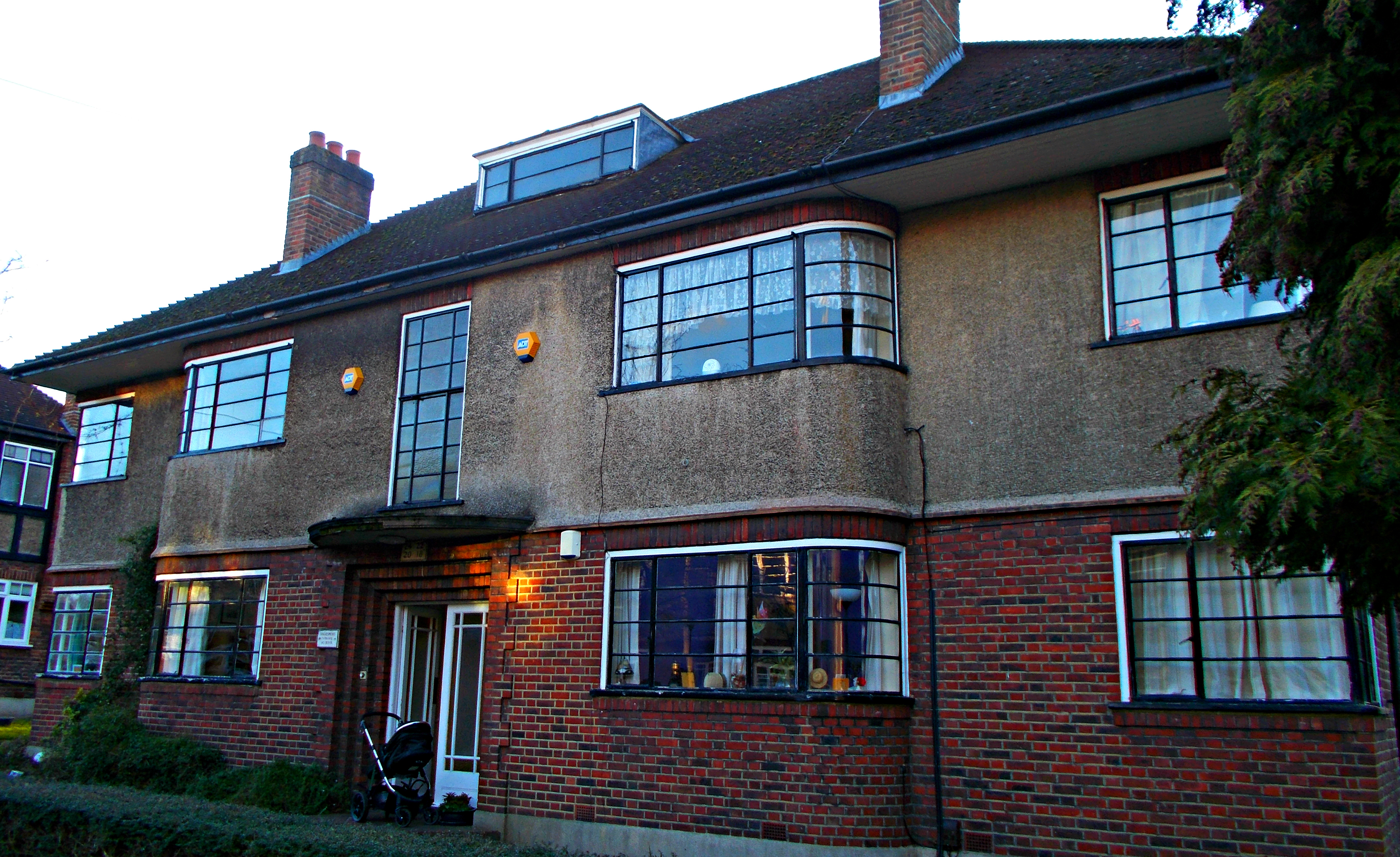

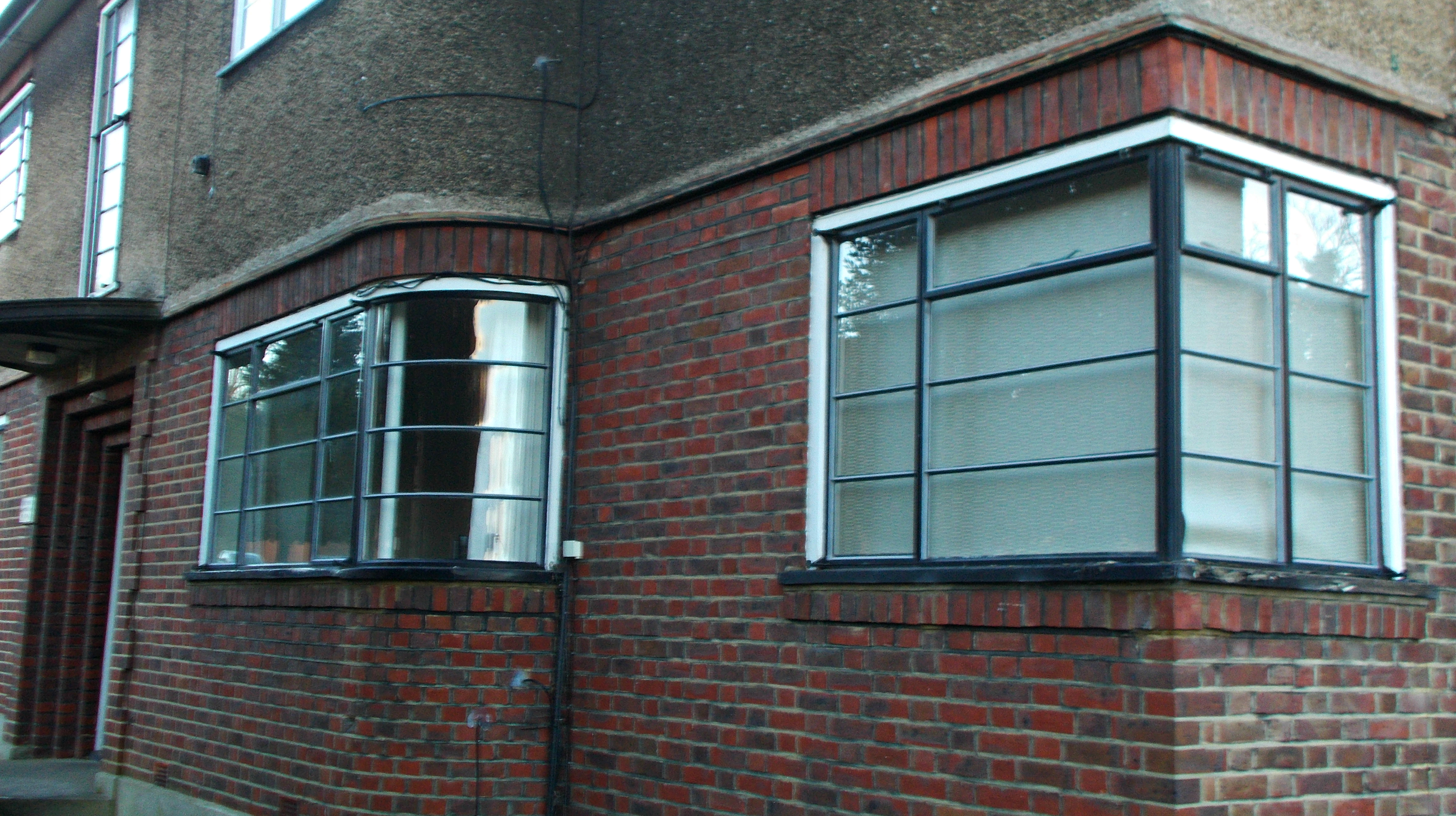
Grove Avenue conservation area

Grove Avenue Conservation Area was built as a private estate in the 1920s or early 1930s. It is situated between Grove Road and Cheam Road, near the Landseer Road Conservation Area. The properties consist of single blocks, each containing four maisonettes, presenting a symmetrical facade to the road. The blocks are alternately built in modernist or half-timbered styles. Many of the details survive, including iron-framed windows, hand-painted number and instruction boards, garage facades, front-garden walls, tree plantings and the estate gate-piers.
