= Benhilton =

Area of the London Borough of Sutton

Coordinates: 51.372°N 0.191°W

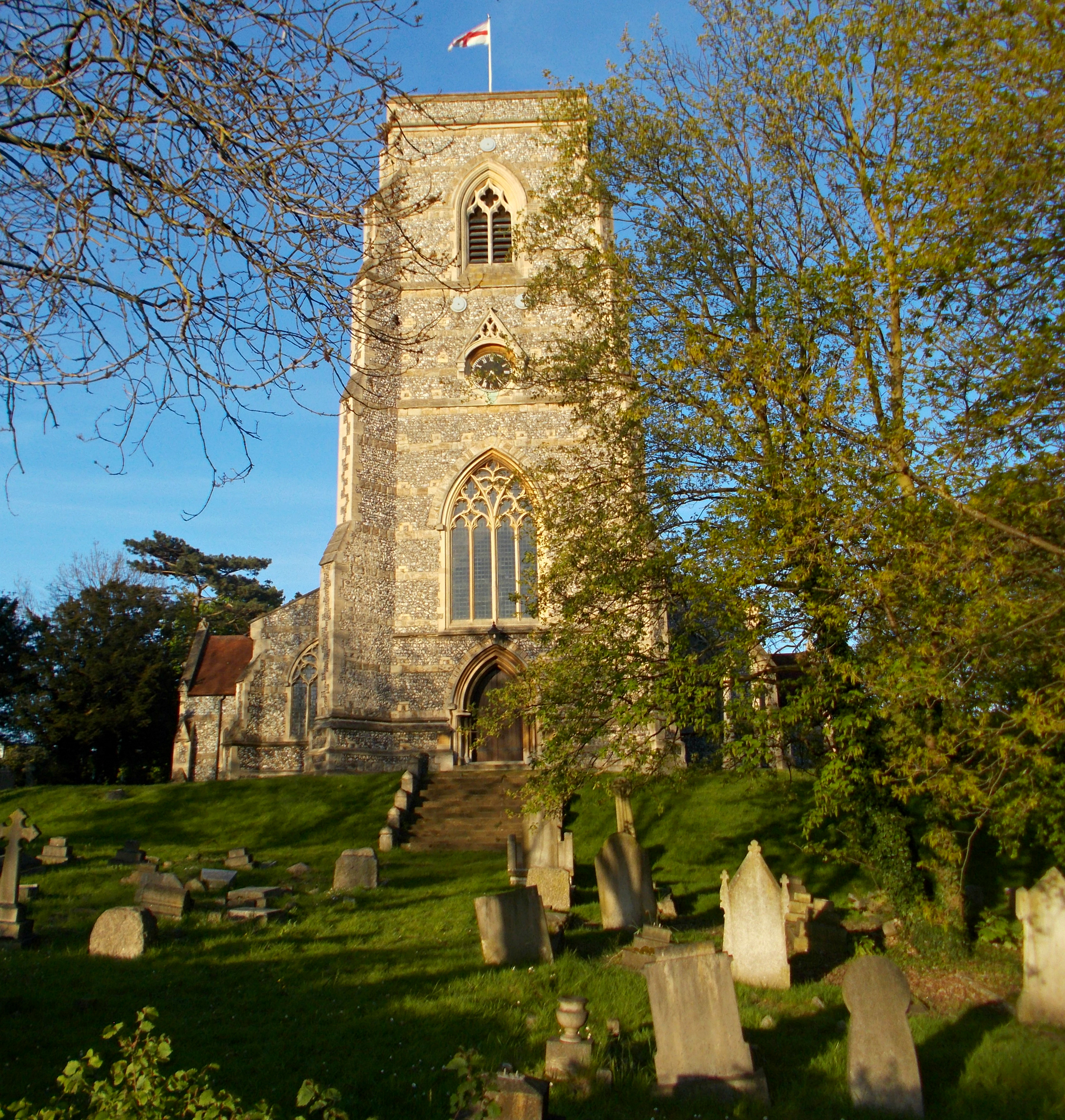
- All Saints church

- Location within Greater London
- OS grid reference: TQ 25 66
- London borough: Sutton
- Ceremonial county: Greater London
- Region: London
- Country: England
- Sovereign state: United Kingdom
- Post town: SUTTON
- Postcode district: SM1
- Dialling code: 020
- Police: Metropolitan
- Fire: London
- Ambulance: London
- UK Parliament: Sutton and Cheam Carshalton and Wallington
- London Assembly: Croydon and Sutton

Benhilton is a suburban parish in north Sutton, Greater London. It is dominated by All Saints Church, which is a Grade II* listed building designed by Samuel Sanders Teulon in a Gothic Revival style and opened in 1863. It also contains All Saints Benhilton, C of E Primary and Greenshaw High School.

Benhilton is significantly elevated above the surrounding area. Great Grennell, the hill on which St Helier Hospital and Greenshaw High School is located, is up to 210 ft., 64m AOD at its highest point; Benhill to the south, approximately where Oakhill Road meets Thicket Road, is 197ft., 60m; Angel Hill, approximately is 164 ft., 53m.

Benhilton mostly lies within Sutton North ward of Sutton Council but also includes parts of Sutton Central, Carshalton Central and The Wrythe; the four ward borders meet in Erskine Village.

== History ==
=== Origin of the name ===
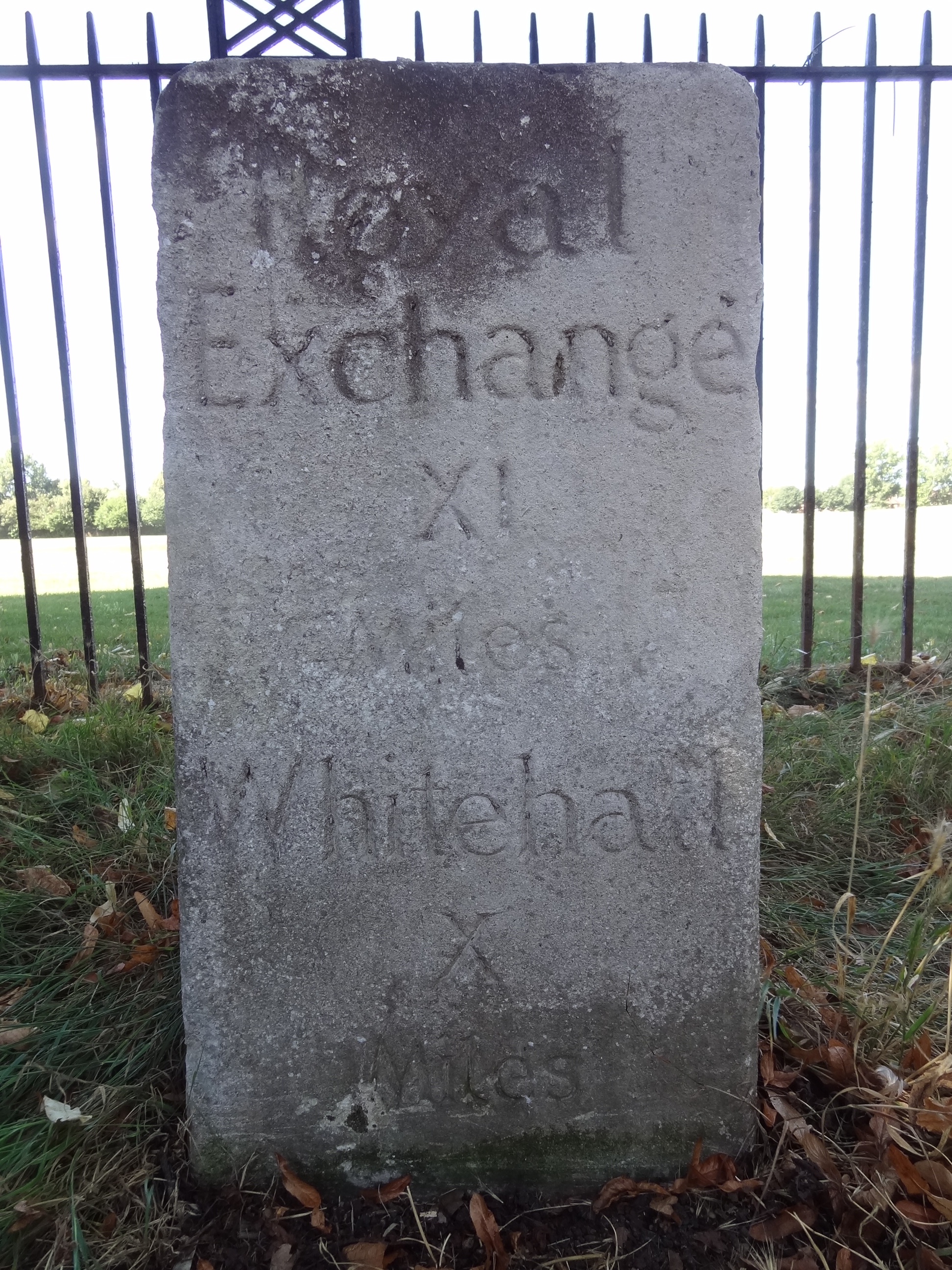
Milestone marking Benhilton's northern boundary at Rose Hill, Sutton, erected 1745.

The immediate derivation of the name Benhilton was from Benhill Farm, which stood close to the corner of Benhill Street and the High Street; it was the largest farm in Sutton and covered much of where Benhill Avenue is now. 18th century maps record the name as 'Been Hill' or 'Bean Hill', and in the late 15th century it was called 'Benehill' or 'Benehyll', suggesting that the farm grew broad beans, which were a staple food in the pre-industrial peasant's diet. The earliest recorded name for the area is 'Benhull' from the 1385 Carshalton Court Rolls. A 1912 history of Surrey refers to: "The district called Benhilton, properly Bonhill, Bonehill or Benhill"; the area to the east of Sutton Common and north-east of the village was known as "Bonhill Common" in the 18th century.

=== 18th and 19th centuries ===
The oldest surviving structures in the parish date from the 18th century, both of which are milestones showing the distance to central London. In 1745, when the Jacobite rising had made manifest to the government the shortcomings of the roads for the rapid transport of troops, the route through Mitcham and Sutton to Banstead Downs, which had been the scene of a failed royalist rising by the Earl of Holland in 1648, was measured and milestones were erected. The first milestone is situated at the northern end of the High Street opposite the junction with Benhill Avenue. On the east side is the inscription: "Whitehall XI Miles. Royal Exchange XII Miles." The second milestone can be found on the west side of Rose Hill next to Rosehill Park, heading north out of the parish towards Rosehill. On the east side is the inscription: "Royal Exchange XI Miles. Whitehall X Miles." and on the northern side the date "1745" is also just legible. More writing on the north and south sides, probably showing distances to other towns and villages in either direction, is no longer legible. They are two of a series of milestones that marked the road from Westminster and London Bridge to Banstead Downs and, from 1755, the route of the turnpike road to Brighton.

The two focal points of the area are Benhill and Angel Hill, the latter being where All Saints Church now stands. Although there is a local legend that the cutting was made on the orders of The Prince Regent (later George IV) to save his horses' energy on the journey to Brighton, the cutting was in fact made rather earlier in the 1770s on the orders of the local turnpike trustees, to drain the road towards the Green and prevent a buildup of mud and clay at the bottom. In May 1823, the journalist William Cobbett noted in his Rural Rides: "They have lowered a little hill on the London side of Sutton. Thus is the money of the country actually thrown away: the produce of labour is taken from the industrious, and given to the idlers." The Angel Hotel, located at the northern foot of the hill, served coaches and travellers on the London to Brighton road until the coming of the train and the motor car made its use as a hotel redundant. It became a public house before it was sold in 2011 and converted into a Tesco Express.

Sutton Common was enclosed in c.1810–12 and Sutton Green was reserved as a recreation ground. To the south side of the Green, a pond with a small island was built and in 1838 a weeping willow 'coronation tree' was planted to celebrate the crowning of Queen Victoria. Cricket was played on the Green, which lent itself to the name of a public house opposite the Green, "The Cricketers", a Grade II listed building which was demolished in 2021. There were still some open fields until Benhill Wood was enclosed in 1854–57, which enabled a coherent architectural development to proceed.

The ecclesiastical parish of Benhilton was formed out of the parish of Sutton on 15 September 1863. Originally conceived as an estate for upper class housing by Thomas Alcock Esq., the landowner and lord of the manor, the development of Benhilton was rapid: where in the 1840s Sutton Common had only been two farms and some cottages, by 1868 there were some 29 large residences. Grand villas including Benhill House (later known as Benfleet Hall) and Sorrento Villa to the north of Sutton Green were built to take advantage of the commanding views to the Crystal Palace ridge six or seven miles away. A cricket ground was located to the north of Angel Hill, opposite the site which is now Rosehill Recreation Ground, and Greenshaw Farm could be found at what is now the corner of Rose Hill and Rosehill Park West, opposite the milestone. Building continued during the late Victorian period and some of the more prominent houses included Broomfields and The Grennell (both located on Great Grennell hill where Greenshaw High School now stands), Benhilton Mount (on the corner of All Saints Road and Benhill Wood Road) and Monksdene, Aysgarth and Elmsleigh, which now lend themselves to names of roads or blocks of flats.

The largest and most prominent villa, Benhill House (later Benfleet Hall), was located on land between Benhill Road, Oakhill Road, Benhill Wood Road and Elgin Road on the plateau at the peak of Benhill. Once the roads had been laid out, Thomas Alcock seems to have preferred to sell off his land rather than develop it himself, and the site of Benhill House was bought by a Mr E.H. Rabbits, who owned a large boot factory at Newington Butts, in 1861. In 1890 the Hall was sold to William Appleton, a tea merchant, and there were other wealthy owners before, in June 1915 during the First World War, it was converted into a temporary military hospital, funded entirely by local donations. After the war it housed a private girls' school, before being demolished in the 1930s and replaced by more modest housing in the form of Benfleet Close.

The two large detached houses on All Saints Road and Benhill Road either side of Grennell Road – one is now a care home and the other a nursing home – date from the 1870s and are probably the oldest surviving houses in the parish, although neither are listed buildings. The three detached houses opposite (on the south western corner of the mini-roundabout, on All Saints Road) date from the Edwardian period, as do the houses on the western side of Elgin Road.

=== 20th century ===
In 1901, the population of the parish of Benhilton was 3,503. A gradual improvement in train services from London to Sutton and then the coming of the motor car made it easier for the most prosperous to live further from their daily work in London, and so by the turn of the century new building in Sutton was characterised either by semi-detached houses or by terraces of various degrees of modesty. As the captains of industry and the managers moved further afield, so the clerks moved in. A map of 1913 shows that the area was still semi-rural and had a working farm, Hallmead Farm (known locally as Skinner's Farm on account of the dairyman who ran it at the turn of the 20th century), in the area of Hallmead Road and Stayton Road. During the late 19th century, much of the area had been covered by brick works and kilns to produce building materials, and in 1913 there was still an active brick field between Gander Green Lane and Collingwood Road. Two abandoned pits, one to the south east of All Saints Church, and the other east of Benhill Road (now a recreation ground), could also be seen and smelt. Whereas the area south of Oakhill Road and around Sutton Green was largely developed by this time, the area to the north was still mostly fields, woods, allotment gardens and detached villas, with some semi-detached houses built, mostly to the west of Woodside Road and Brunswick Road in the direction of Sutton Green, and between Grennell Road and Hillview Road, the latter road having been laid out but not built. The local Surrey dialect is likely to have still been spoken by many of the working class at this time; usage declined during the 20th century as Sutton was absorbed by Greater London and Estuary English rose to prominence.

Building of the Sutton Garden Suburb on open land to the north began in 1912 but was interrupted by the First World War; following an end to hostilities, building continued during the 1920s and 1930s. By the time of the Second World War, the parish was mostly fully developed and built-up; some streets and houses including the areas around Benfleet Close, Waverley Avenue and Grennell Road were, however, yet to be built. Curiously The Grennell, another grand late Victorian villa which became the new site of Greenshaw Farm during the early 20th century, had survived even though Benfleet Hall had not; it was eventually demolished in the 1960s to make way for Greenshaw High School.

By the 1890s, Victoria Pond at Sutton Green had a reputation more for its smell than its looks and following many complaints it was cleaned out, and given a solid lining and railings. An elm tree was planted for Queen Victoria's diamond jubilee in 1897, and an oak for Edward VII's coronation in 1902. The pond served as an emergency water source during the Second World War but it was drained completely in 1955. A visitor in 1905 wrote of "the lovely old elms" edging the Green, which have now gone, as has a terracotta fountain, also placed in 1902 to commemorate Edward's coronation.

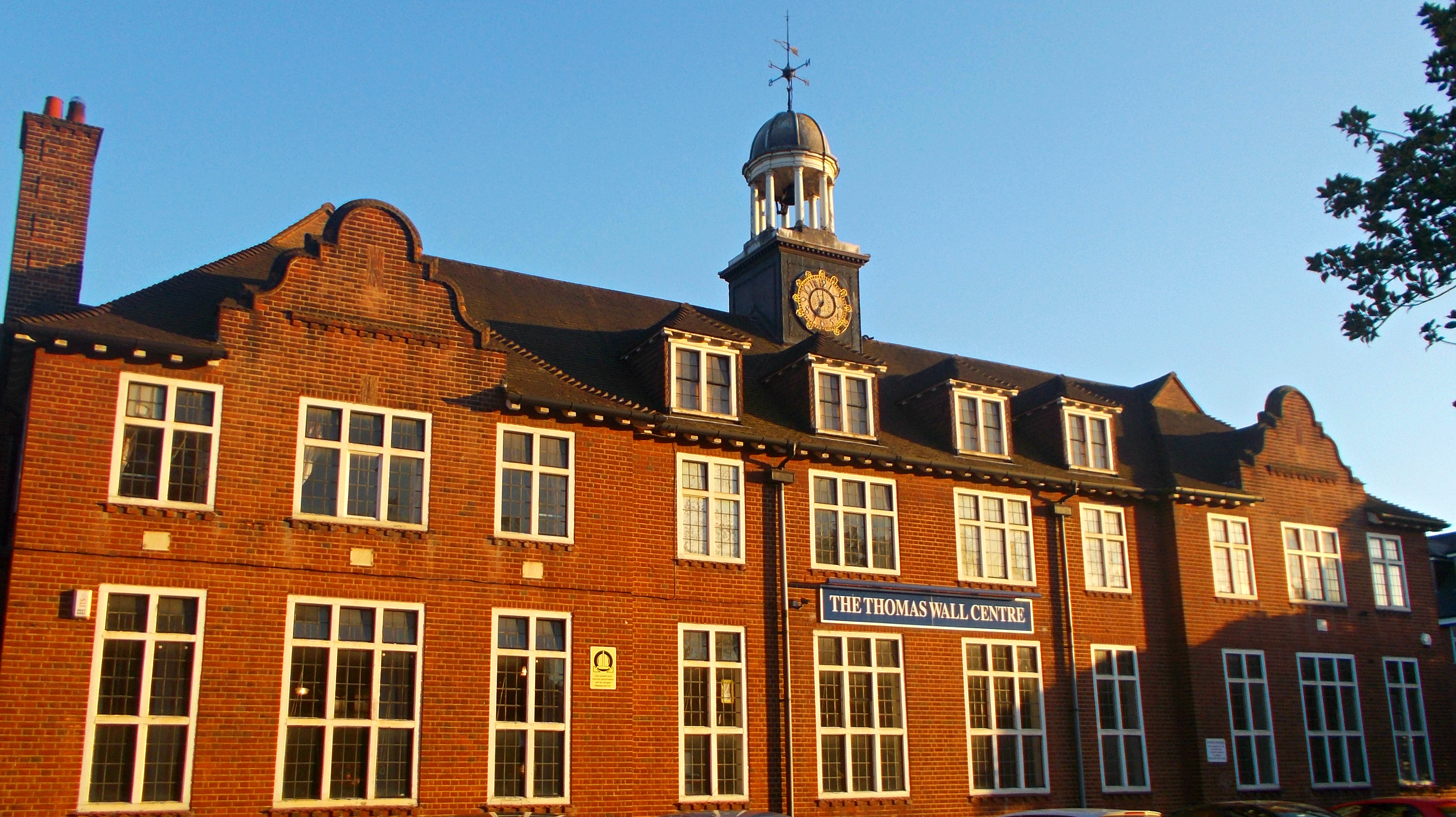
The Thomas Wall Centre, which opened in 1910 as the Sutton Adult School and Institute

The County of Surrey Electrical Power Distribution Company was formed in 1899; by the time that it supplied its first customers in 1902, it had become the South Metropolitan Electric Tramways & Lighting Company. Trams followed in 1906, running from Croydon through Carshalton (where the depot was located) to Sutton along Westmead Road, Lower Road, Benhill Avenue and Benhill Street, terminating next to the High Street. In 1935 the trams were replaced by trolleybuses, and the wires were extended up to Sutton Green, in order to provide a turning-circle. The trolleybuses were removed in 1959 once the internal combustion engine had made them redundant, and no visible traces now remain other than the notable width of the streets bordering the Benhilton area. The site of the former trolleybus terminus on Benhill Avenue is now a Salvation Army centre.

The parish was only lightly bombed during The Blitz compared to some parts of London, with most bombing clustered in the area north of Sutton Green and around Angel Hill. At 11.30pm on 9 September 1940, two high explosive bombs blew out some of the stained glass windows in All Saints Church and damaged the adjoining National School. Further heavy bombing in the parish occurred on the nights of 10, 11 and 28 September and 8 and 29 November 1940. The school and vicarage were destroyed by flying bombs during the summer of 1944. The school was rebuilt and reopened in 1950; it was rebuilt again on the site of the old vicarage on All Saints Road in the late 1980s. The adjoining vicarage is relatively new and was built on the site of the previous building in 2014.

A visible relic from the War can be found at the peak of Great Grennell in Rosehill Park East, close to the Grennell Road entrance, where a concrete tank trap was built into the hill to slow an advance by enemy tanks. It formed part of the Outer London Defence Ring.

== Benhilton today ==
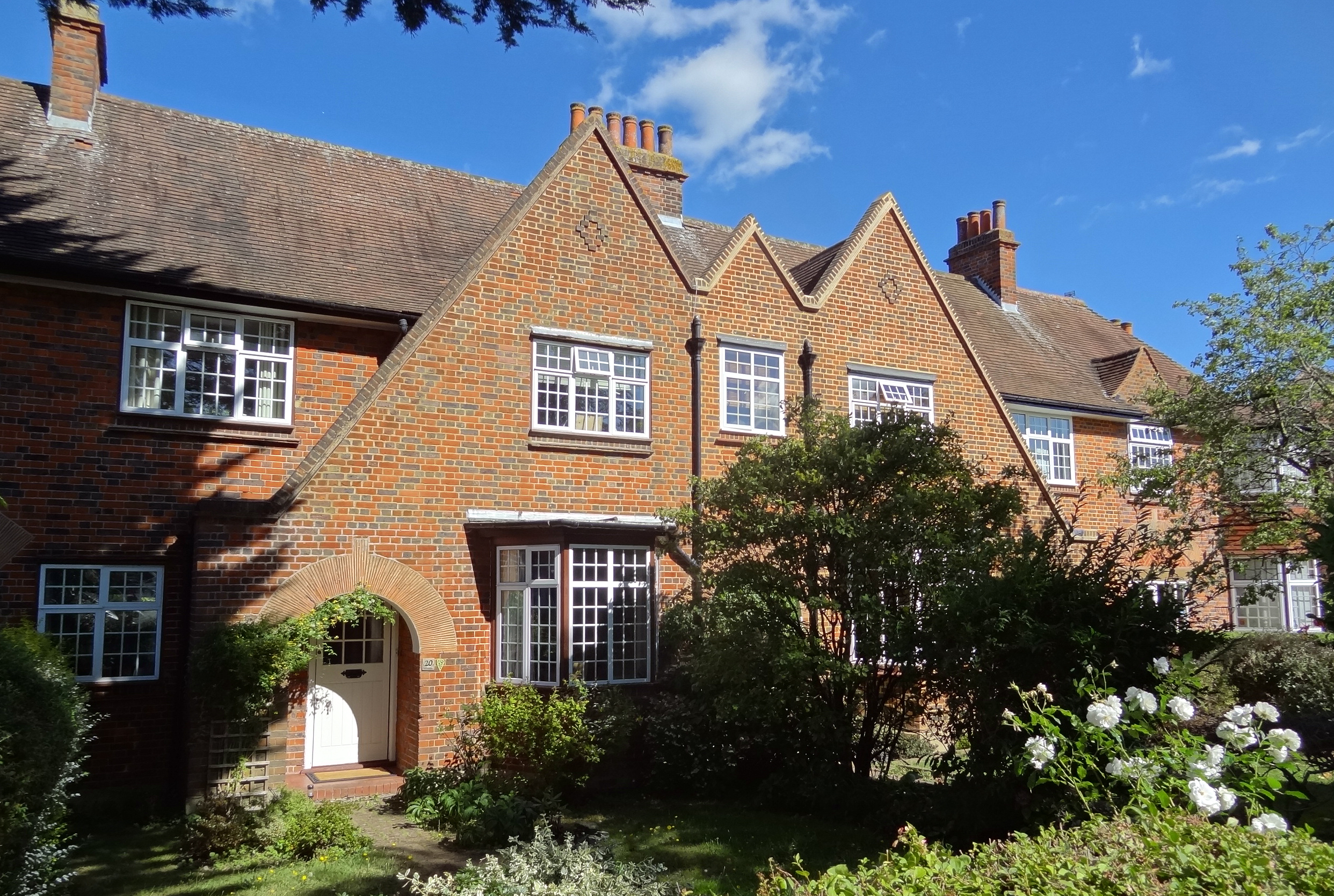
Houses at Woodend in the Sutton Garden Suburb

Benhilton is mostly residential, comprising a mixture of Victorian and Edwardian town houses, inter-War detached and semi-detached houses, private blocks of flats and the low-rise Benhill Estate, which underwent major refurbishment and architectural improvements as part of an extensive programme of work from 2011 to 2013. More modern late 20th and early 21st century infill is evident along All Saints Road, Benhill Wood Road and Woodside Road in particular.

Benhilton is home to the long established Thomas Wall Centre, a large Edwardian building available for public use. Originally called The Sutton Adult School and Institute, it first opened in 1910 and 1911. Named after the area's benefactor of Wall's sausage and ice cream fame, the Centre runs a weekly programme of events, provides rooms for hire and hosts an onsite hypnotherapist. The garage on the corner of Aultone Way and Angel Hill, built between 1910 and 1913 and which is still in use today, was originally used for the storing of the 'Stop Me and Buy One' bicycles of Wall's ice cream business.

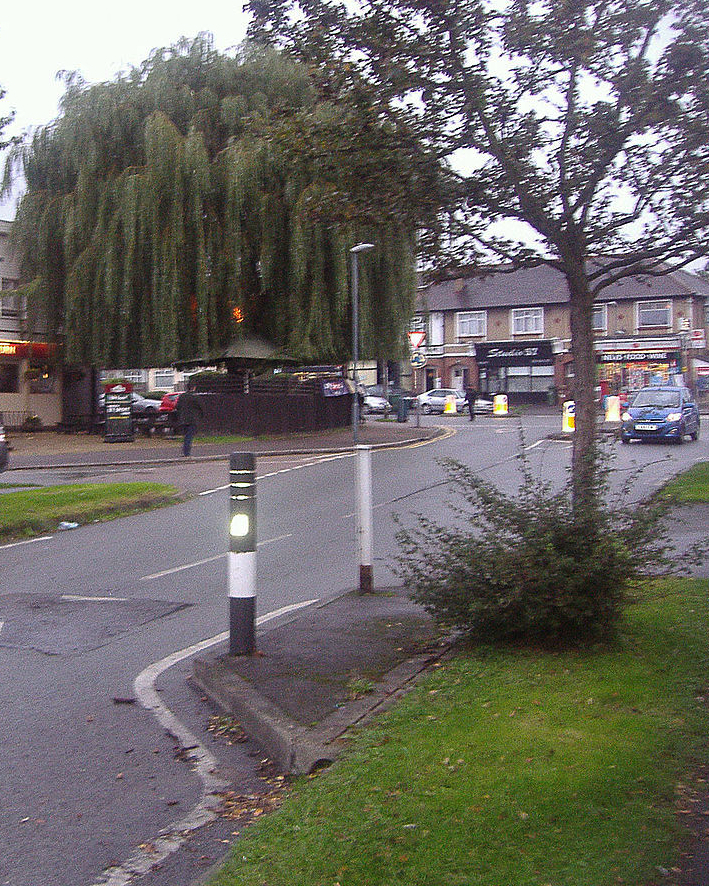
Weeping willow in Erskine Village

As well as All Saints Church, a building housing the Korean Catholic Church in London can be found on the corner of All Saints Road and Benhill Wood Road. The Holy Family Catholic Church is located at Sutton Green.

The Granfers Community Centre on Oakhill Road is a hub for various local voluntary and charitable organisations. The Benhill Crescent Horticultural Society maintains allotments on Benhill Road. 1st North Sutton Scout Group have their headquarters on Stayton Road and another building in Benhilton Gardens.

Erskine Village, a small commercial area, borders the Poets Estate, an inter-War estate mostly comprising semi-detached housing with streets named after famous English poets including Lord Byron (Byron Gardens), John Milton (Milton Avenue) and Elizabeth Barrett Browning (Browning Avenue) among others.

Benhilton is the location of the historic Sutton Garden Suburb.

== Local transport ==
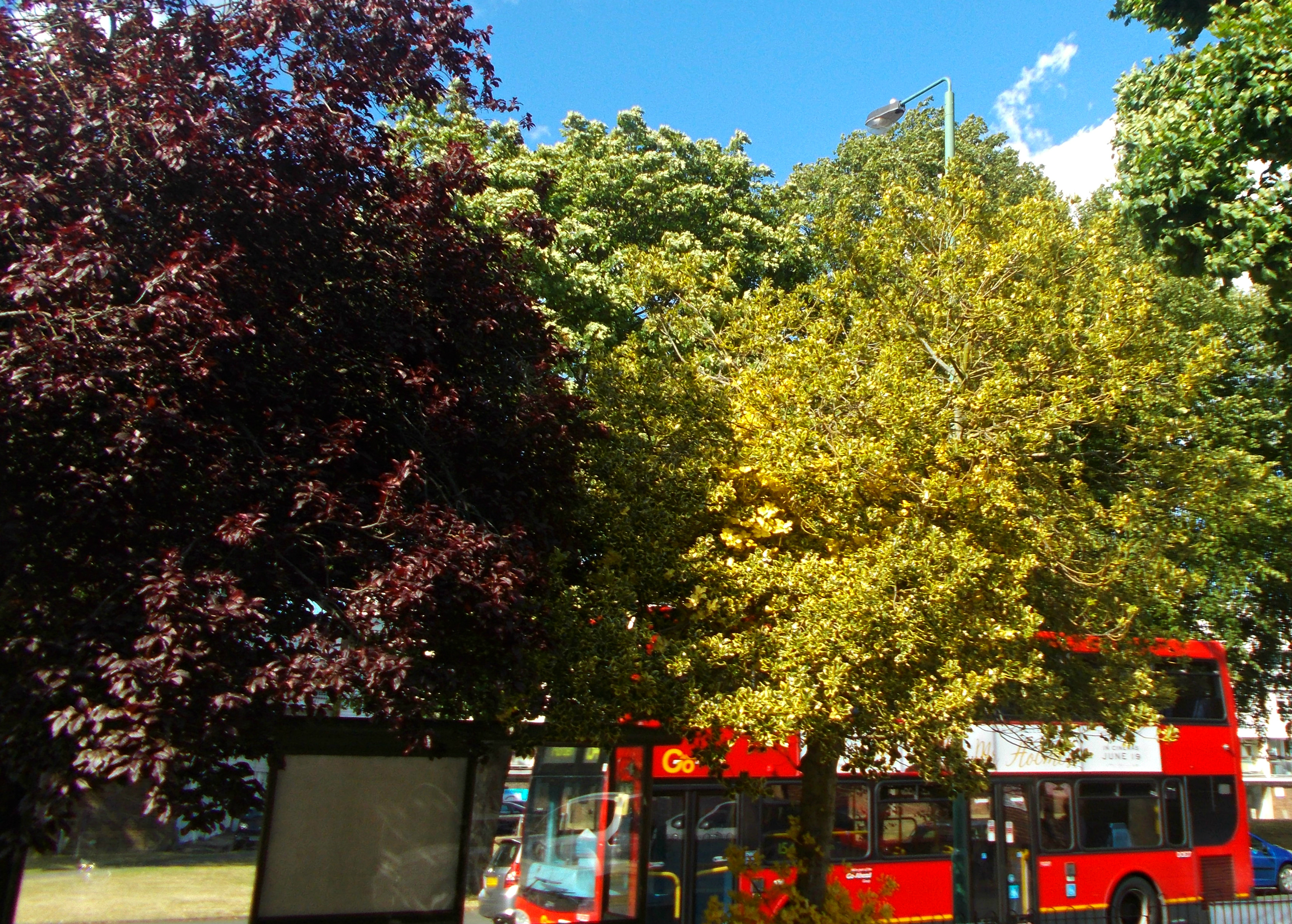
Bus at bus stop outside Thomas Wall Centre, Benhill Avenue

Several London Buses routes serve the area, with many going to Sutton and St Helier.

Other buses including the 213 to Kingston can be caught (heading southbound towards Sutton railway station) from the stop opposite Sutton Green and Victoria Gardens. Sutton Common railway station, which has trains to Sutton, Wimbledon, London Bridge, London Blackfriars, and St Albans, is a short walk west from Angel Hill and pedestrian access to the main part of Benhilton is via a footbridge across the cutting.

Local cycle routes 29 (Rosehill Park East/Grennell Road to Benhill Avenue) and 75 (Croydon to Kingston via Sutton, along Westmead Road, Lower Road and Benhill Avenue) pass through the area. Route 208 starts at Angel Hill and heads across Rosehill Park West to Wimbledon.

== Local economy ==
Small clusters of local shops can be found opposite Sutton Green, around Sutton Common station and to the north of Angel Hill. A sub-post office was located at Angel Hill from the 1930s until it closed in late 2004. To the south east of Benhilton is Erskine Village; its small commercial area includes a convenience store, a pub ("The Butterchurn"), a pharmacy, a garage and a post office, among around ten establishments in total. The owner of the pharmacy, Reena Barai, was voted Britain's Best Pharmacist by readers of Woman's Weekly in 2014.

== Local geography ==
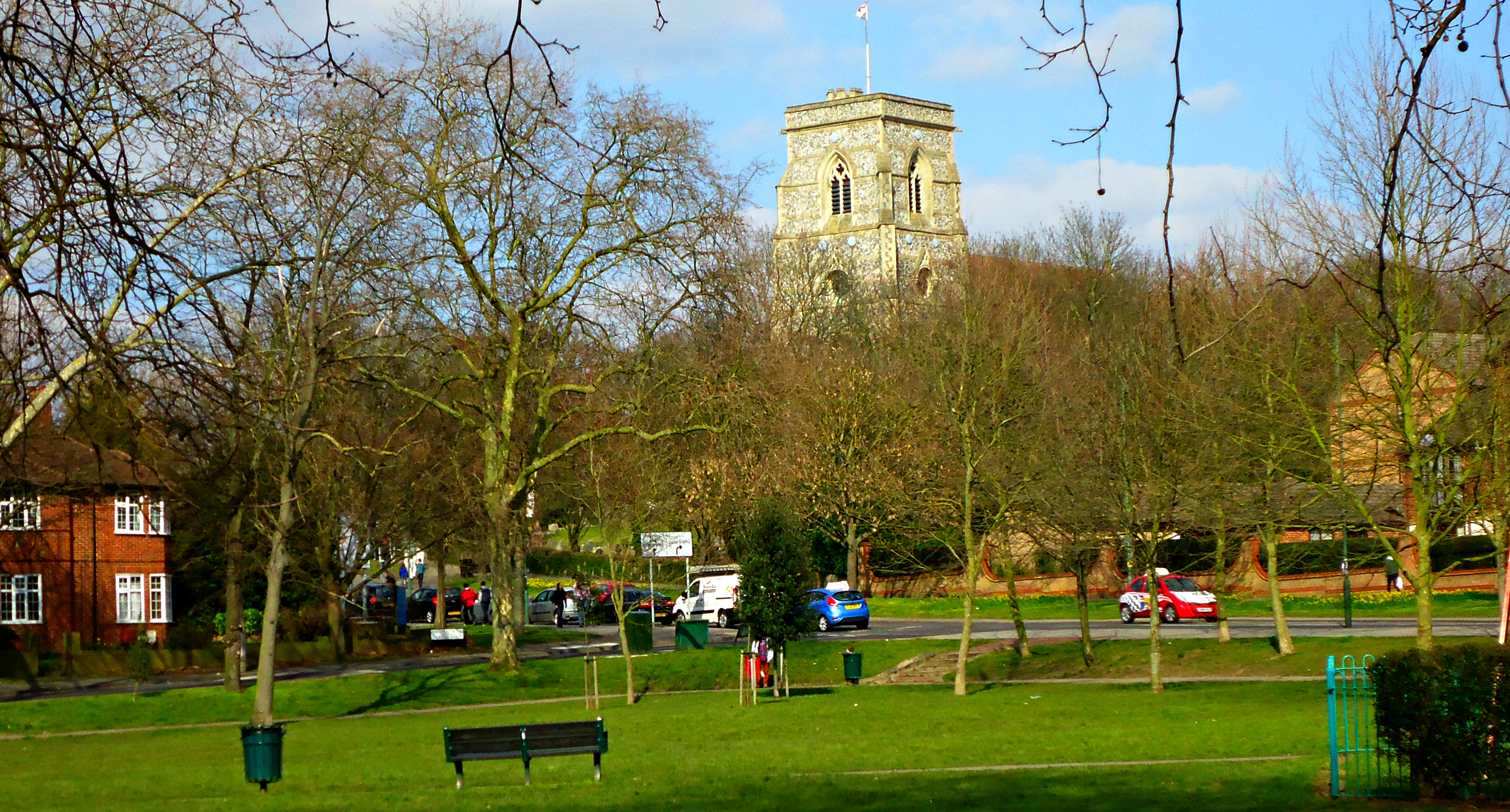
All Saints Church as seen from Sutton Green
