= John Booker =

John Booker may refer to:

- John Booker (astrologer) (1603–1667), English astrologer
- John Booker (cleric) (1820–1895), English cleric and antiquarian
