= John Booker (cleric) =

English cleric and antiquarian

Reverend John Booker FSA
- Born: 31 March 1820; Leeds, Yorkshire
- Died: 16 July 1895 (aged 75); Benhilton, Surrey
- Education: Magdalene College, Cambridge (BA MA)
- Occupations: Cleric; Antiquarian

John Booker (31 March 1820 – 16 July 1895) was an English cleric and antiquarian.

== Early life ==
Booker was the son of a merchant, John Booker, of Leeds, Yorkshire. His brothers were also clerics, Samuel Briddon Booker (1824–1911) and William Booker (1828–1903) who was vicar of Brighouse, Yorkshire. He was educated at Leeds Grammar School, Shrewsbury School and St Catharine's College and Magdalene College, University of Cambridge, where he studied for his BA and MA degrees. He was ordained as a deacon in 1844 and as a priest 1846.

== Career ==
Booker was curate at Harpurhey, Manchester, from 1844 to 1848, at Prestwich from 1848 to 1858, and at Ashhurst, Kent from 1858 to 1863 before becoming vicar at Benhilton, Surrey, where he remained until 1895. He was the author of works on the history of some of the churches and townships in Manchester. He was a member of the Chetham Society and served as a Member of Council from 1856 to 1864 and was elected a Fellow of the Society of Antiquaries of London in 1855. He died, at Benhilton, Surrey, at the age of 75.

== Family ==
Booker married one of the two daughters of James Prince Lee, the first Bishop of Manchester.

== Bibliography ==
- Booker, J., Memorials of the Church in Prestwich, Simms and Dinham: Manchester, 1852.
- Booker, J., A History of the Ancient Chapel of Blackley, George Simms: Manchester, 1854.
- Booker, J., A History of the Ancient Chapel of Denton, Chetham Society, Old Series, 37 (1855).
- Booker, J., A History of the Ancient Chapels of Didsbury and Chorlton, Chetham Society, Old Series, 42 (1857).
- Booker, J., A History of the Ancient Chapel of Birch, Chetham Society, Old Series, 47 (1859).
