= All Saints Church, Benhilton =

Coordinates: 51°22′21″N 0°11′35″W

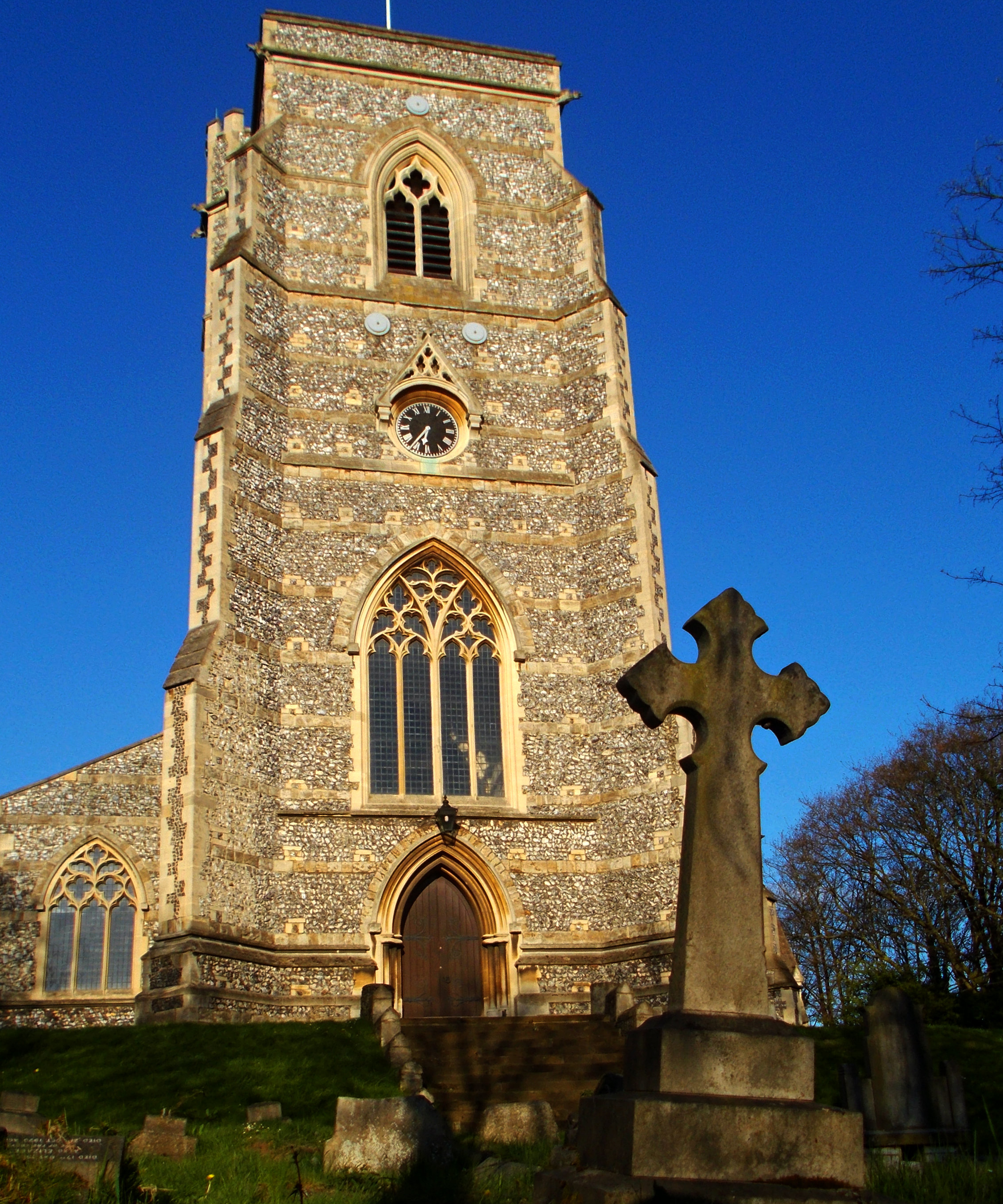

- Location within Sutton
- Country: England
- Denomination: Church of England
- Churchmanship: Anglo-Catholic

Architecture
- Designated: 15 September 1863
- Architect: Samuel Teulon
- Completed: 1906

Administration
- Diocese: Diocese of Southwark

Clergy
- Bishop: Bishop of Fulham
- Vicar: Vacant

Listed Building – Grade II*
- Designated: 28 August 1953
- Reference no.: 1065697

All Saints Church, Benhilton, is an English parish church within the Anglican Diocese of Southwark in the Church of England. The church is located in Sutton, Greater London, in the Sutton parish of Benhilton and was built between 1863 and 1867. It is a Grade II* listed church and has been described by Historic England as "a fine example of mid-Victorian church-building by an important architect of the Gothic Revival" (Samuel Sanders Teulon).

== Location ==
The church is located just to the north of the Sutton town centre, to the east of Angel Hill on All Saints Road and looking down towards Sutton Green. It stands on an artificial platform built up on a south-facing slope. The hill on which the church stands was partially formed as a result of earth moved there during the building of the Angel Hill cutting in the 1770s. Its large size and prominent location makes it a local landmark.

== History ==
The parish of Benhilton was created on 15 September 1863, and the foundation stone of the Grade II* listed church, designed by Samuel Teulon in the Gothic Revival style, was laid in the same year. The building owed much to Thomas Alcock who was then lord of the manor, and who gave £18,000 towards the building, the land for the church, the vicarage and a school. The church was conceived as an amenity for an estate of upper class Victorian housing which Alcock was developing on the land to the east.

The nave and south aisle were finished first, the tower and chancel were added in 1867, while the north aisle was not fully roofed until 1906. The church has always been noted for its bells; the first was the tenor bell, which was presented by Thomas Alcock and was rung on the day the church was consecrated. The framework for a complete peal was fixed in the tower in 1877. Another bell was added the same year, and a third the year after. By 1882 there were six and all eight were inaugurated on 1 November 1893 (All Saints Day).

Kelly's Directory of Surrey 1903 contains the following entry: "Benhilton ecclesiastical parish was formed out of the parish of Sutton, September 15, 1863. The church of All Saints, erected in 1865, at a cost, including site, house, schools and endowment, of £24,000, is of flint, in the Early Decorated style, and has a tower containing a clock and 8 bells: the stained east window is a memorial to Thomas Alcock esq.: there are 874 sittings, one half being free. The register dates from the year 1866. The living is a vicarage, yearly value £375, with 1 acre of glebe and residence, in the gift of E.G. Coles esq." The entry goes on to state that the population of the parish in 1901 was 3,503.

== Architectural features ==
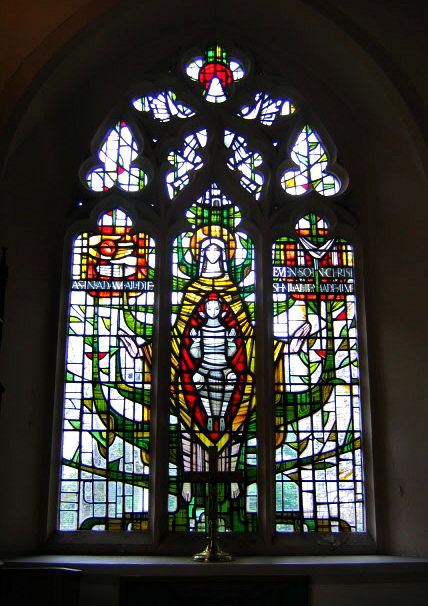
Stained glass window by John Hayward

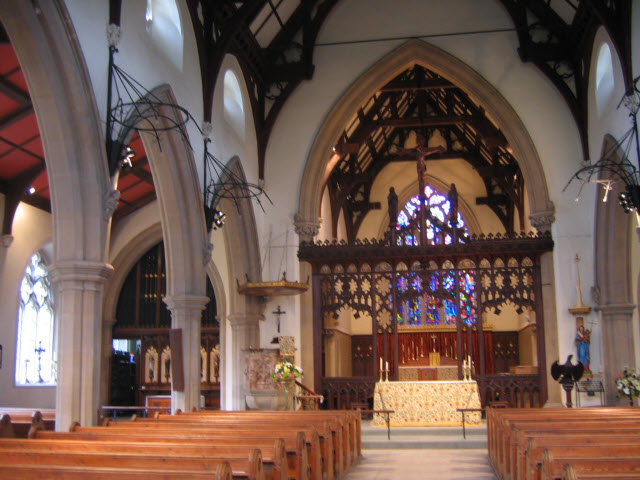
Church interior

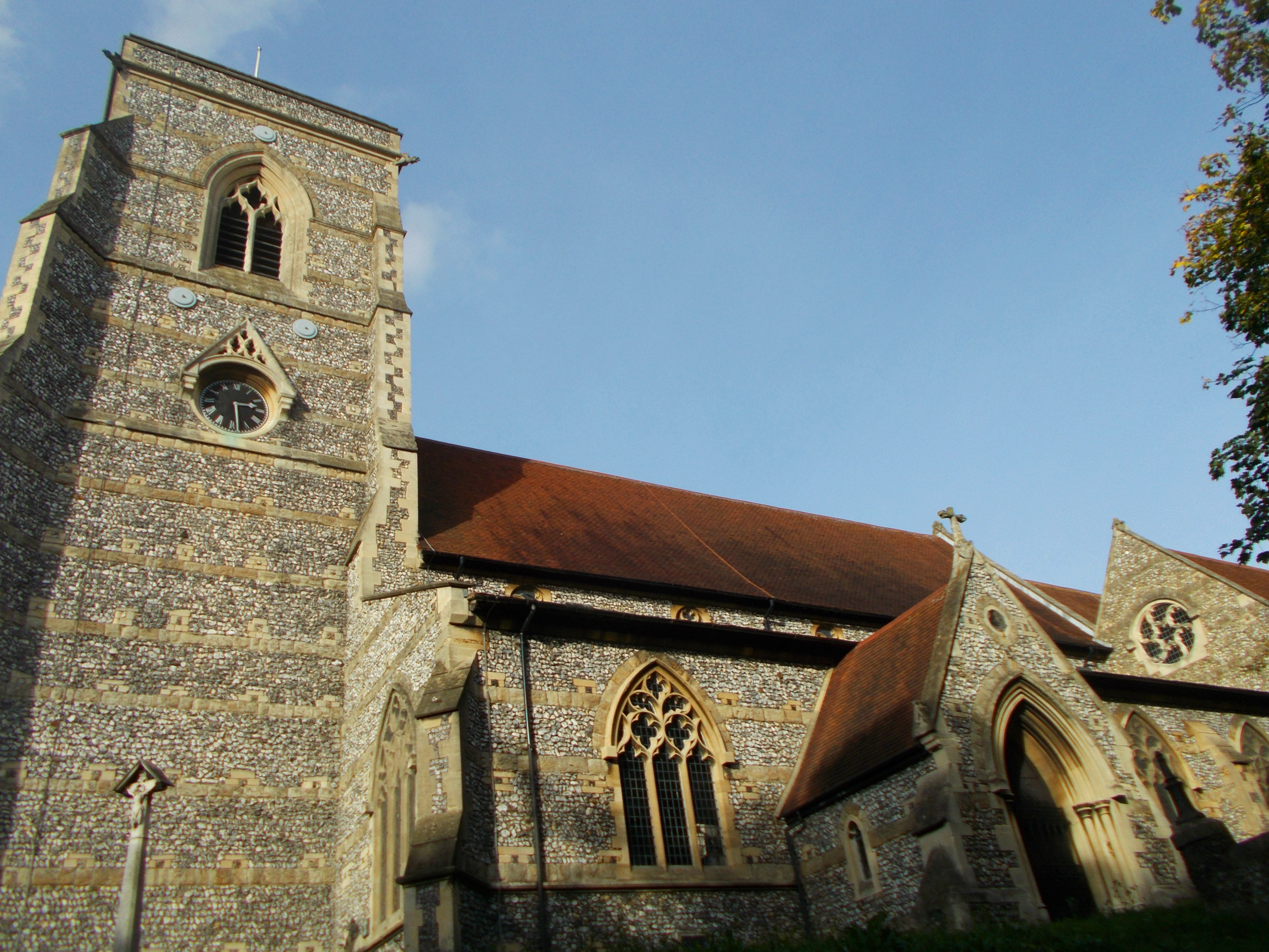
Church exterior

The church is made up a wide nave with rounded clerestory windows, a chancel, north and south aisles, Lady Chapel, vestries with organ chamber above, imposing west tower, and north and south porches. It is brick built with flint facing externally, natural stone dressings with trussed timber roof covered with plain clay tiles.

Historic England (formerly English Heritage) describes the church as "a fine example of mid-Victorian church-building by an important architect of the Gothic Revival. It is unaltered externally, and possesses a flint and masonry construction. It has a number of fixtures of interest, including some important 1960s stained glass and a striking roof.

The church has a large four-stage tower at its western end. The tower features a doorway and a four-light window which has, like the other principal windows of the church, flowing tracery. There are three clocks in the third stage of the tower on its north, south and west faces under a gable containing flowing tracery. In the belfry stage the opening on each face is a two-light reticulated window. The tower has diagonal buttresses to its west face, and a NE stair turret which rises above the plain parapets of the top of the tower. The aisles have lean-to roofs and above these, sandwiched in a narrow band below the eaves of the nave, is a clerestory with circular windows with alternating triskele and mouchette-and-quatrefoil infilling. The aisle windows are broad and have flowing tracery in the three lights, alternating in design in each bay.

The stained glass windows were all destroyed by bomb blast damage in 1944. These were replaced in the decades following the end of the Second World War. The principal window in the east wall of the chancel was installed in 1965. It was designed by Jasper and Mollie Kettlewell and depicts Christ in Majesty flanked by St Dunstan, St Peter, St Lawrence and St Nicholas. The South aisle has two windows by John Hayward depicting the Madonna and Child and Christ in Majesty, also installed in 1965. Hayward also introduced depictions of flames to the tracery of the other windows in the south aisle. The three windows of the Lady Chapel were designed by John Lawson of Goddard & Gibbs and installed in 2001. They depict the Annunciation, Visitation and Nativity.

The southern chapel and northern vestry/organ chamber lie under their own gables and have florid three-light fenestration similar to that in the aisles. Both porches have moulded outer doorways. The northern porch is vaulted. An unusual feature of the exterior walls is the widespread traces of former putlog holes, no doubt used for the scaffolding during the construction of the building. These are often found on medieval buildings but were usually carefully filled in and obliterated on Victorian ones. Here they are made a feature of with the side pieces and cappings clearly evident. The hood stops of the arch heads have nearly all been left uncarved.

== Grounds ==
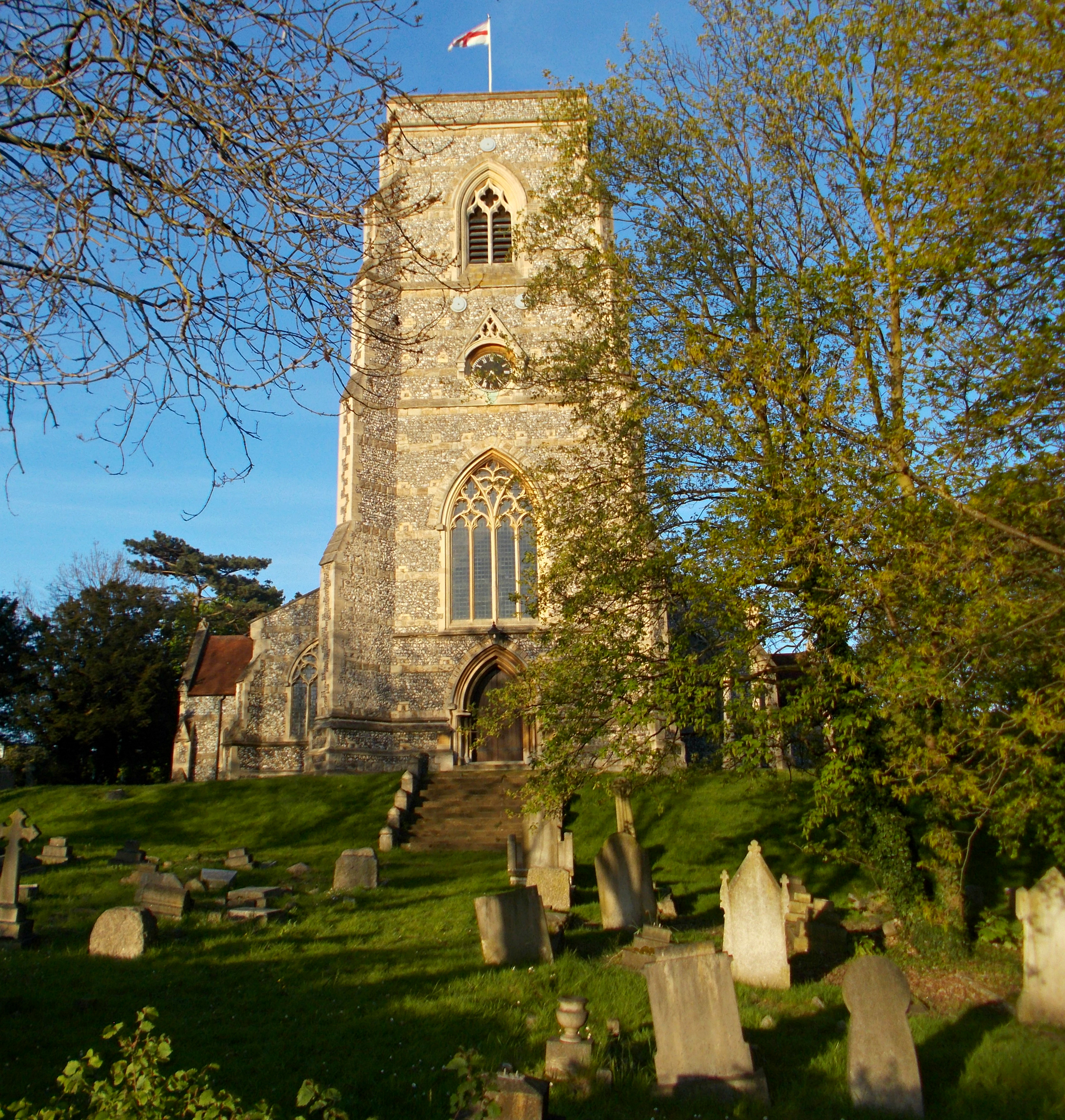
Church and churchyard

There is a historic churchyard around the church, which includes several significant tombs. It is wooded, including yew trees beside the path to the north porch.

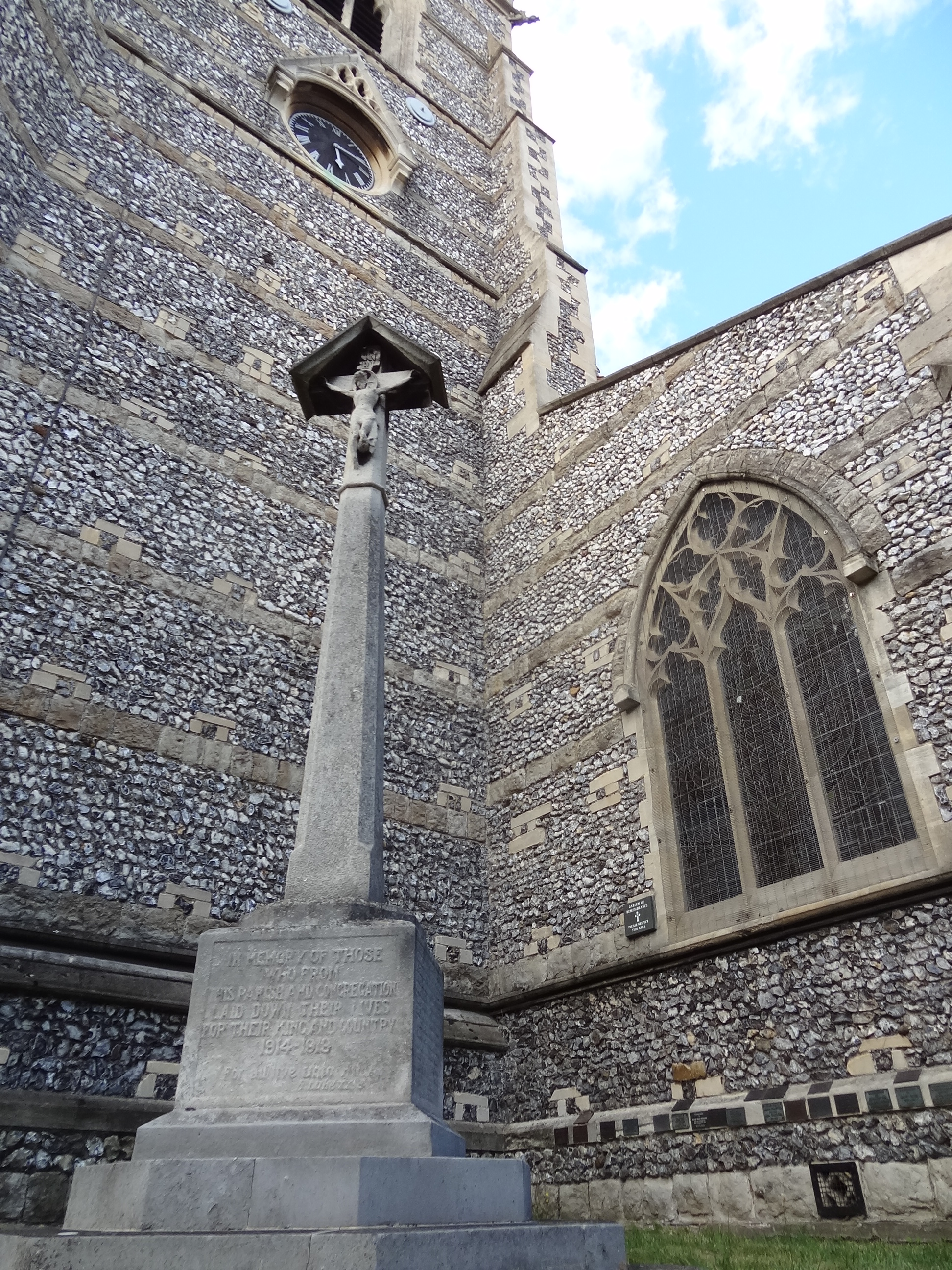
First World War memorial

At the south western corner of the church is a memorial to men of the parish who died during the First World War. The inscription reads: "In memory of those who from this parish and congregation laid down their lives for their King and country, 1914-1918. For all live unto Him. Luke XX." There is a separate, smaller memorial to the side dedicated to F.A. Munford of H.M.S. Sharpshooter. In all, 54 men of the parish are recorded as having lost their lives during the Great War.

== Bells ==
The All Saints Benhilton Society of Change Ringers was formed in 1896 and regular practice and service ringing has been carried out since then, except for a brief interlude during the Second World War. The tower was restored by the ringers in 1970 and a new ring of all eight bells (cast by the Whitechapel Bell Foundry) was dedicated in 1971. The weight of the tenor bell is 13.5 cwt tuned in F#. Practices are on Tuesdays from 7.45 to 9.15 pm and Sunday ringing is from 8.45 to 9.30am. The tower captain is Jeremy Cheesman.
