= Barclays Bank building, Sutton =

Building in Sutton, London, England

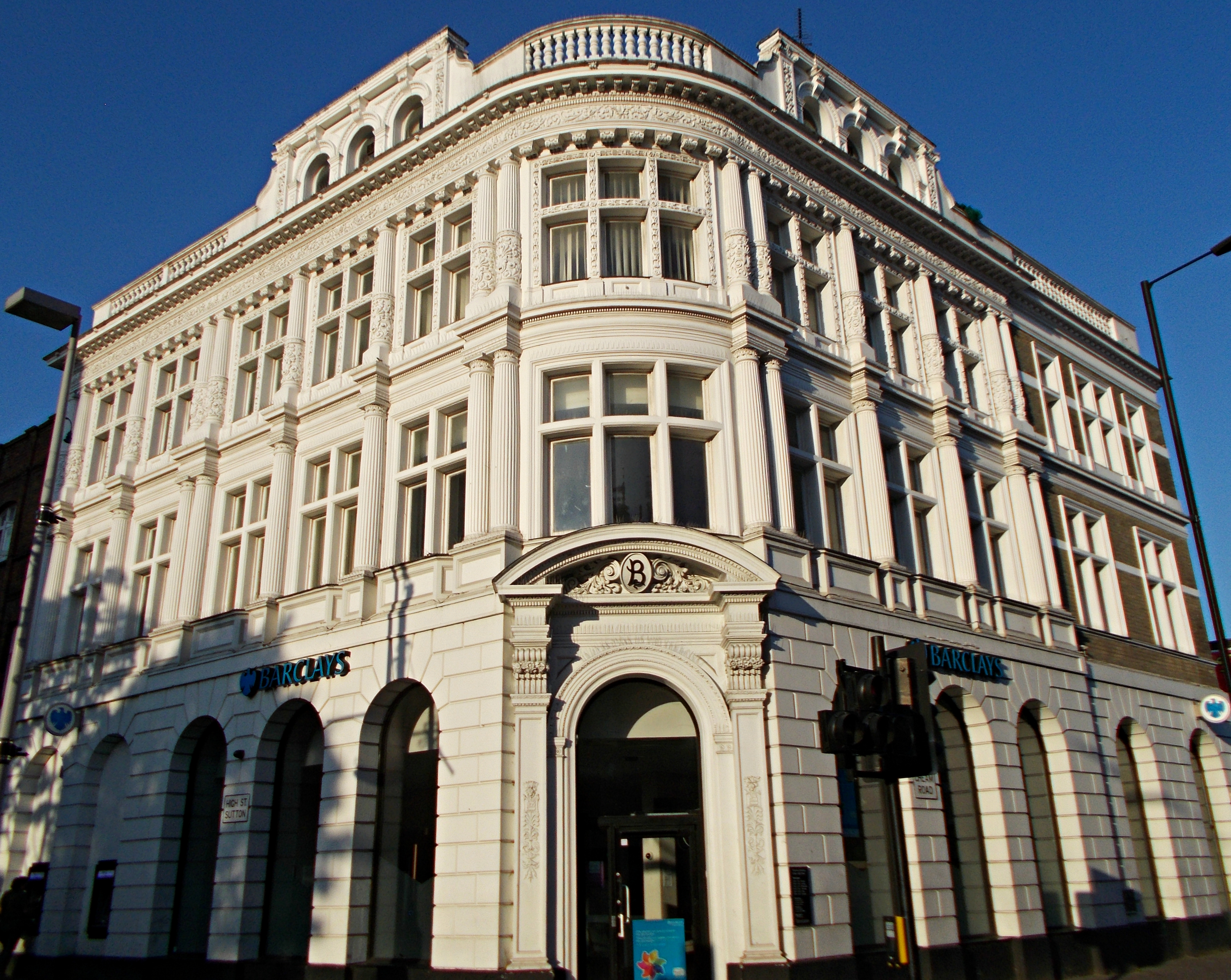
- Barclays Bank building, Sutton town centre

- Location within Greater London

General information
- Location: Sutton, London Borough of Sutton, Greater London, England
- Coordinates: 51.361191°N 0.192188°W
- Completed: 1894
- Client: London and Provincial Bank

Technical details
- Size: Four storeys

The Barclays Bank building is a four-storey locally listed building overlooking the historic crossroads in the town centre of Sutton in the south London Borough of Sutton. It was built in 1894, originally as the London and Provincial Bank.

== Location ==
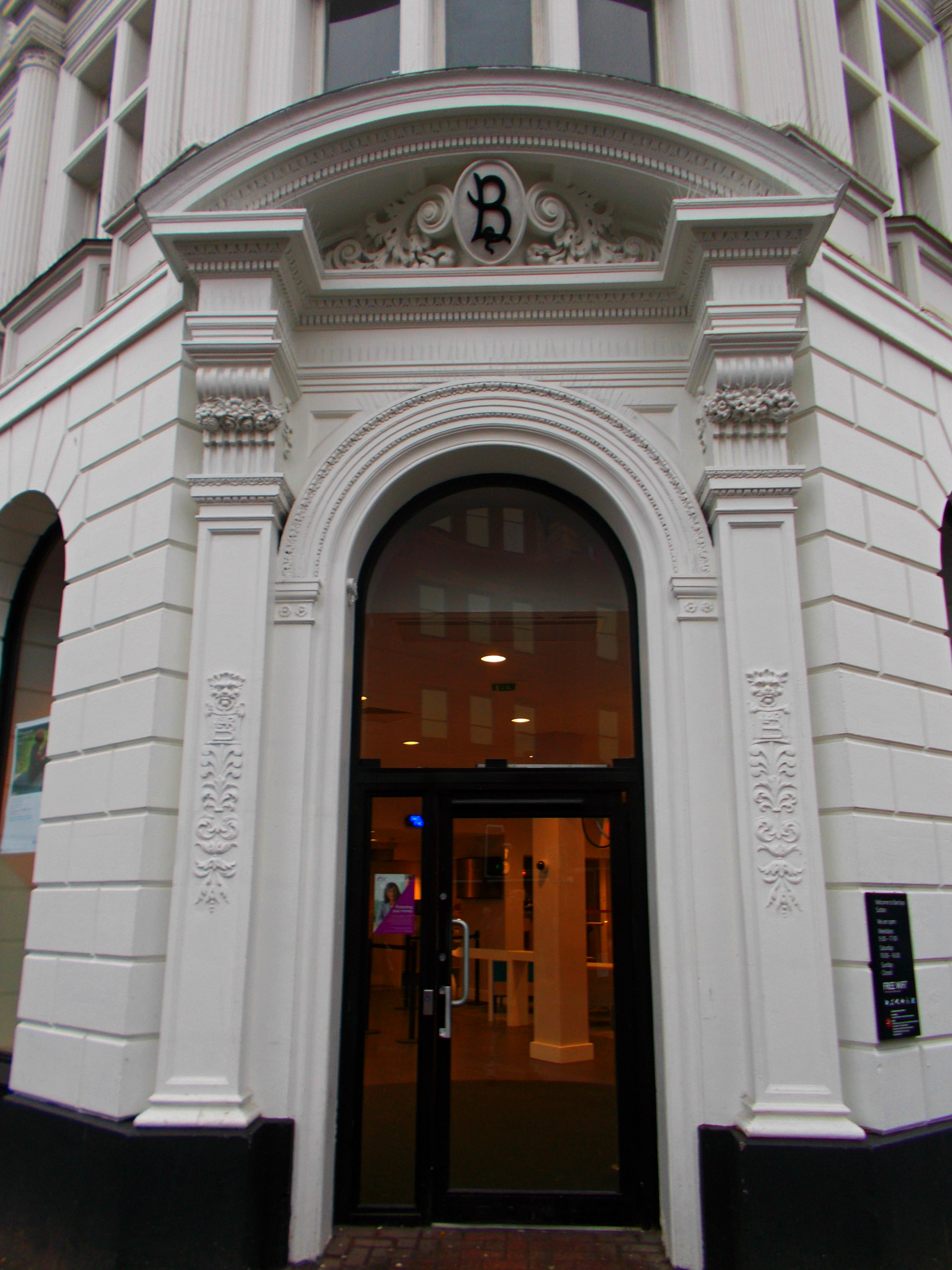
Entrance to building

The building is at the junction of Cheam Road and Sutton High Street, the crossroads of the historic turnpike roads which passed through the town. It is on the south-west corner of the crossroads. It is in the Sutton Town Centre High Street Crossroads Conservation Area, which was designated on 9 May 2011. From March 2017 it has also been in the town centre's Heritage Action Zone.

== Architecture ==
The building is four storeys in height, of ornate design and in the French renaissance style. It forms a prominent landmark when arriving in the town centre. There is a series of arches at ground level within rusticated stonework. The main entrance is on the corner where the two roads meet, rounded in shape and surrounded by an ornate architrave and segmental pediment, which together serve to create a sense of importance for the bank.

The second storey has fluted columns and simple cross windows. The windows, columns and dentil on the third storey are surrounded by decorative carvings. The attic is on the fourth storey and set within a decorative, balustraded parapet under which there is a decorative frieze.

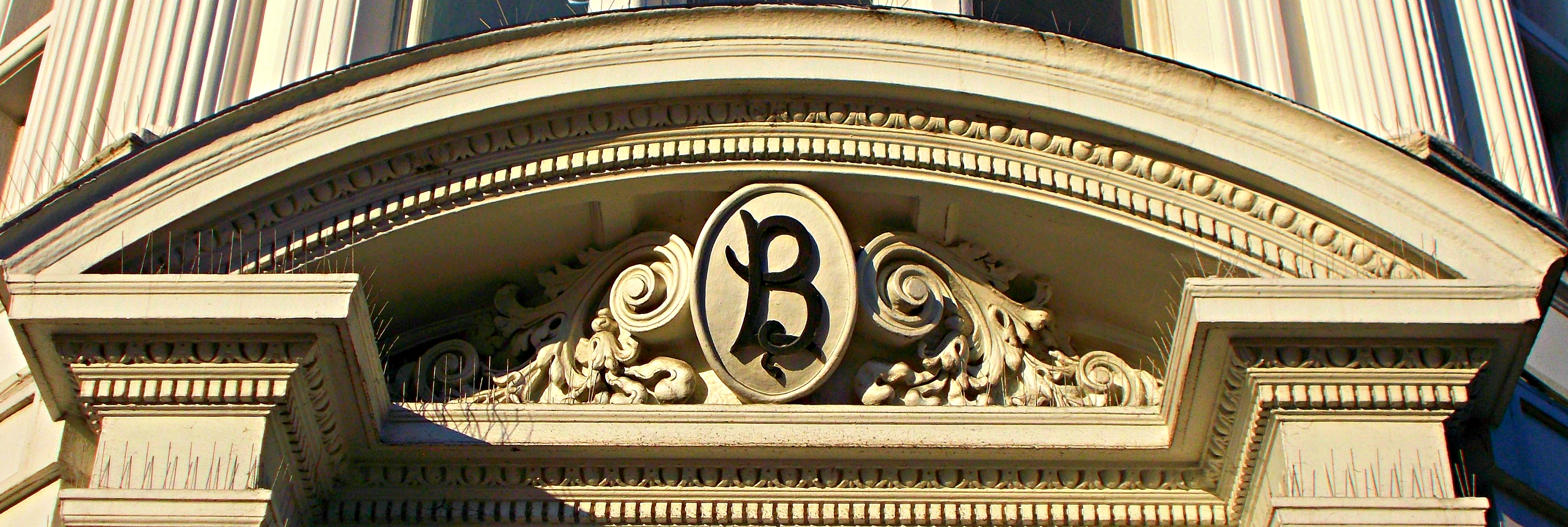
The ornate pediment above the doorway
