= Ben Hill (baseball) =

American baseball player

- Third baseman
- Born: July 2, 1916; Savannah, Georgia, US
- Threw: Right

Negro league baseball debut
- 1943, for the Philadelphia Stars

Last appearance
- 1943, for the Philadelphia Stars

Teams
- Philadelphia Stars (1943)

Benjamin Hill (July 2, 1916 – death date unknown) was an American Negro league baseball third baseman who played in the 1940s.

A native of Savannah, Georgia, Hill made his Negro leagues debut with the Philadelphia Stars in 1943.
