= Trinity Church, Sutton =

Coordinates: 51°21′42″N 0°11′44″W

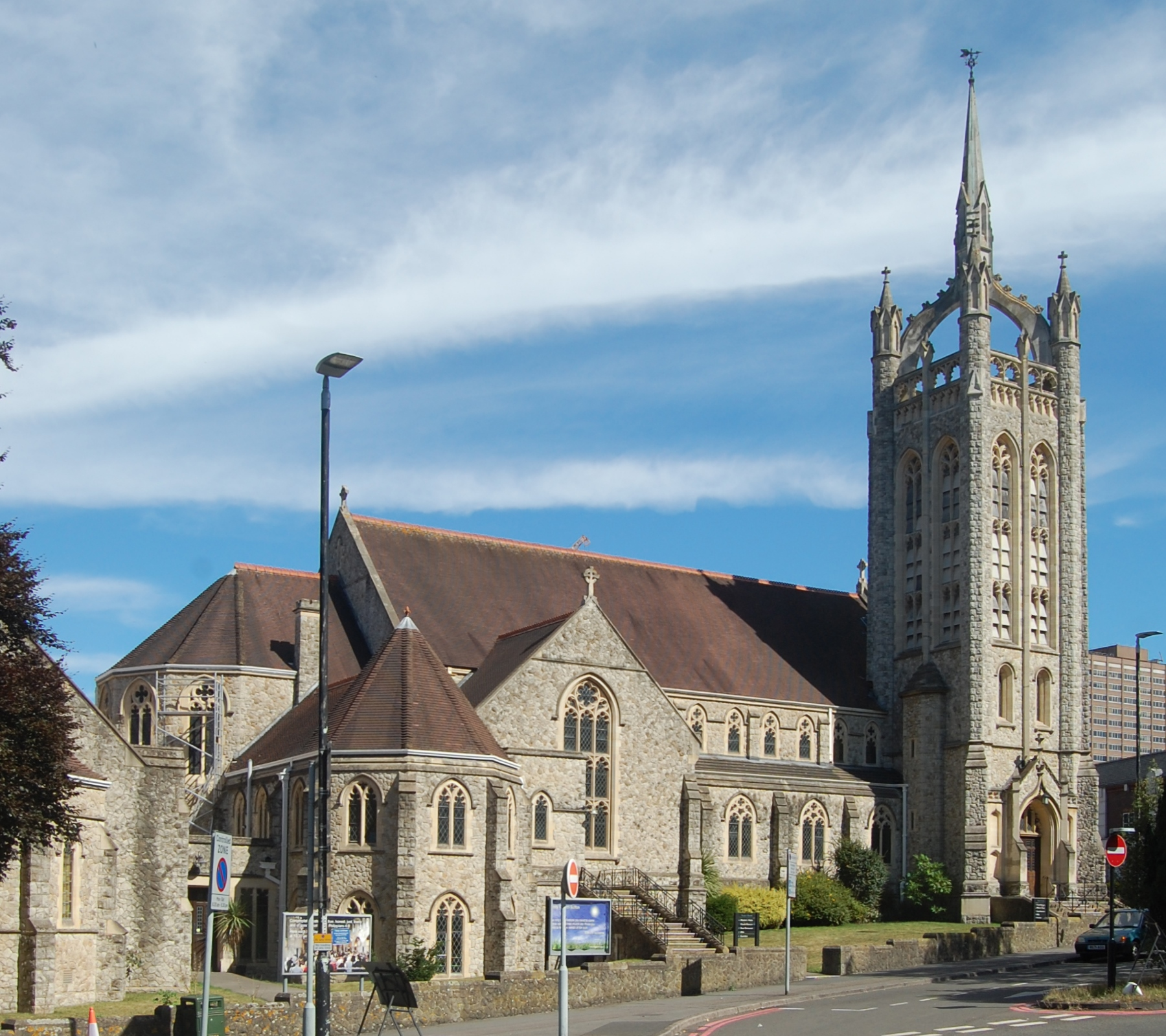
- Trinity Church, Sutton

- Location within Sutton
- Country: England
- Denomination: United Reformed and Methodist
- Website: www.trinitychurchsutton.org.uk

Architecture
- Architect(s): Gordon and Gunton
- Style: Gothic Revival
- Completed: 1907

Listed Building – Grade II
- Designated: 1 March 1974
- Reference no.: 1200708

Trinity Church, Sutton is a Grade II listed United Reformed and Methodist church in the centre of Sutton, London. It was built in 1907 in the Gothic style with Kentish ragstone with Bath stone dressings. It was designed by architects Gordon and Gunton.

== Location ==
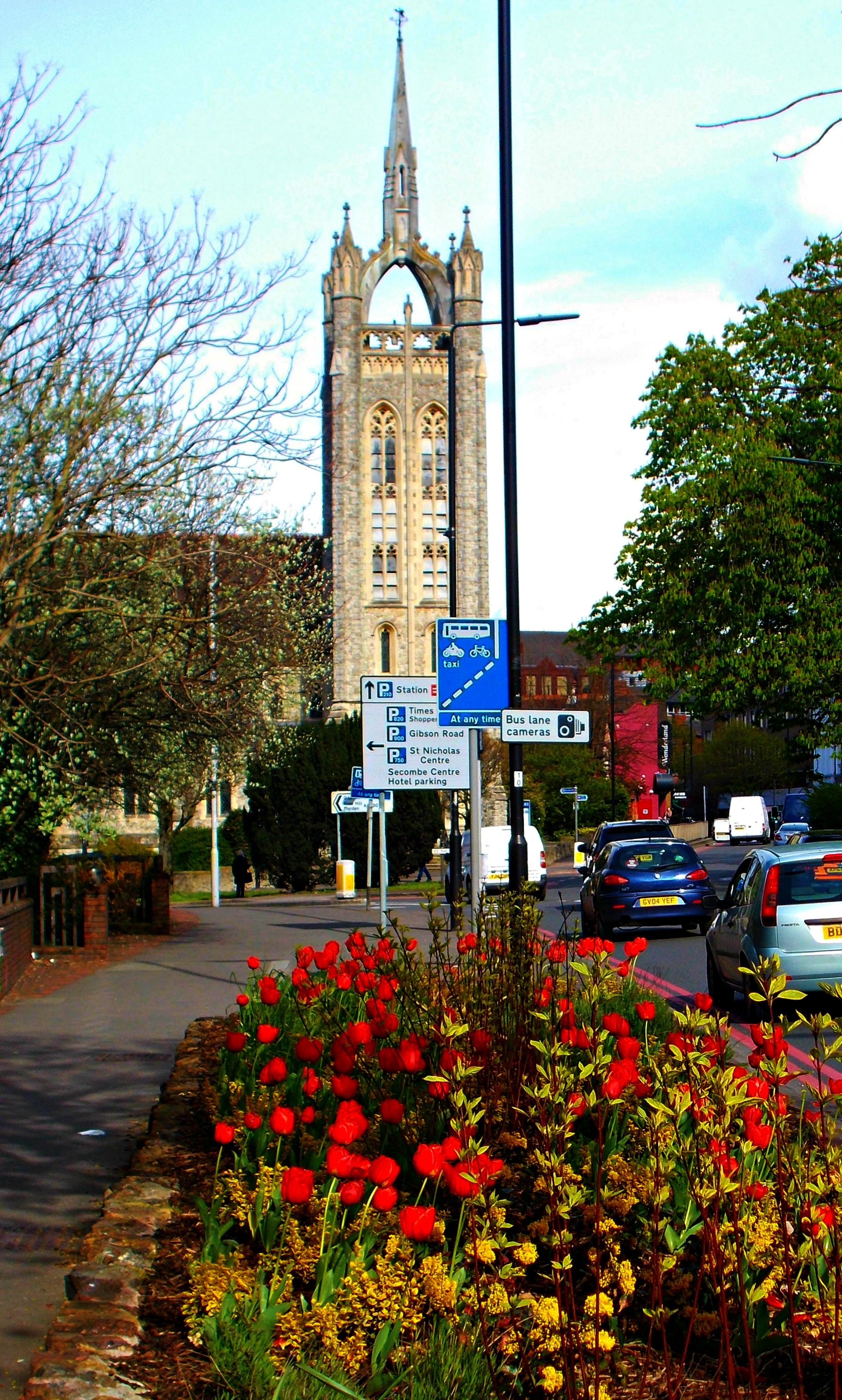
Trinity Church in the Spring as seen from Cheam Road, looking east

Trinity Church is situated in Cheam Road, Sutton. Its size and position make it a landmark in the town.

== History ==
The church was officially opened on 2 October 1907 as Trinity Wesleyan Church, and replaced a former building nearby. It was renamed Trinity Methodist Church following the Methodist Union in 1932. In 1972 the Congregational and Presbyterian Churches united, and the Congregational and Methodist congregations in Sutton also united, with Trinity becoming a joint United Reformed and Methodist church.

== Architectural features ==
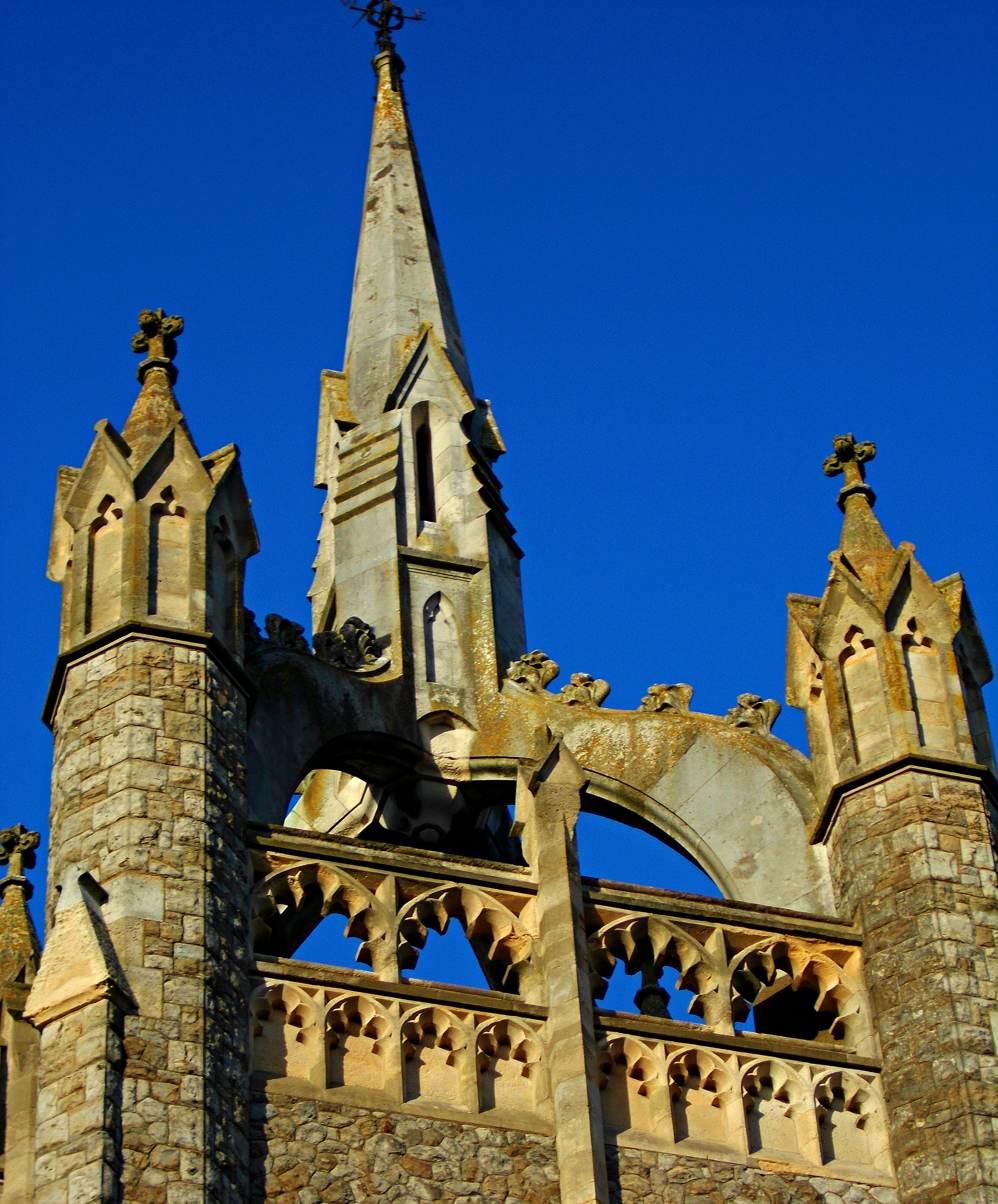
The crown and lantern spire

The church comprises a complex of buildings. Its most striking feature is its very unusual "crown and lantern" spire, a design shared with two cathedrals — St Giles' Cathedral in Edinburgh and Newcastle Cathedral.

The building, now Grade II listed, is in the Gothic style and was designed by architects, Gordon and Gunton. The exterior is in Kentish ragstone with Bath stone dressings. The roofs have plain tiles. There is a hall at the north end on an east-west axis linked to the church at the south end on a north-south axis. The church comprises a nave, a polygonal apse at the north end, transepts, side aisles and a south-west tower. The windows in the nave include single-light cusped-headed ones with quatrefoils and side-aisle ones of two lights and a transept window three lights wide and three lights deep. Projecting from the north-west end of the nave is a wing with a semi-octagonal, pointed roof. Each facet of the west end is flanked by a buttress and in each facet are two tiers of fenestration, each window of two lights. Windows to the apse of the main church are taller, also of two lights.

The south-west tower of the church is the most striking architectural feature of the building and makes the building a landmark - it is a tall square tower with a pierced two-light opening in earth side, a pierced parapet, angle buttresses with pinnacles and a short spire supported by carved buttresses with a ball flower ornament. A flight of steps leads up to entrance at the base of tower. The church hall at its west end is of one-storey; its structure is polygonal against a west gable wall. Each bay of the north and south fronts of the western part are flanked by buttresses; four-light windows are set within a pointed arch with battered reveals. There is stringcourse and parapet and a bellcote on the ridge. At the east end there is a two storey wing with a projecting bay with spire and gables to each side at the west end; to the east of this, there are two bays with three-light windows on the ground floor and an eight-light window above.
