= Greenshaw High School =

Location
- Grennell Road; Sutton, Greater London, SM1 3DY; United Kingdom; 51°22′37″N 0°11′02″W

Information
- Type: Academy
- Motto: Committed to Excellence
- Established: 1967
- Founder: Reg Whellock
- Department for Education URN: 136800 Tables
- Ofsted: Reports
- Head teacher: Nick House
- Staff: William Smith [Chief Executive Officer, Greenshaw Learning Trust]
- Gender: Co-Educational
- Age: 11 to 18
- Enrolment: 1828
- Colours: Green and Black
- Website: http://www.greenshaw.co.uk/

Greenshaw High School is a coeducational academy of some 1600 pupils situated in Sutton, England.

The school was opened in 1968 as a purpose-built Comprehensive School. The first Headmaster was Mr Reg Whellock.

Greenshaw became an academy on 1 June 2011. In October 2014 it was reconstituted as a multi academy trust under the name 'Greenshaw Learning Trust'. It also has a sixth form for students aged 16 to 18. In 2008, students in the Greenshaw Sixth Form achieved results in the top 25% of schools nationally. It has been awarded the Arts Council Silver award, Associate Training School, Investor in People and Healthy School awards.

== Notable pupils ==
- Harry Aikines-Aryeetey, athlete
- Barry Winch, gymnast

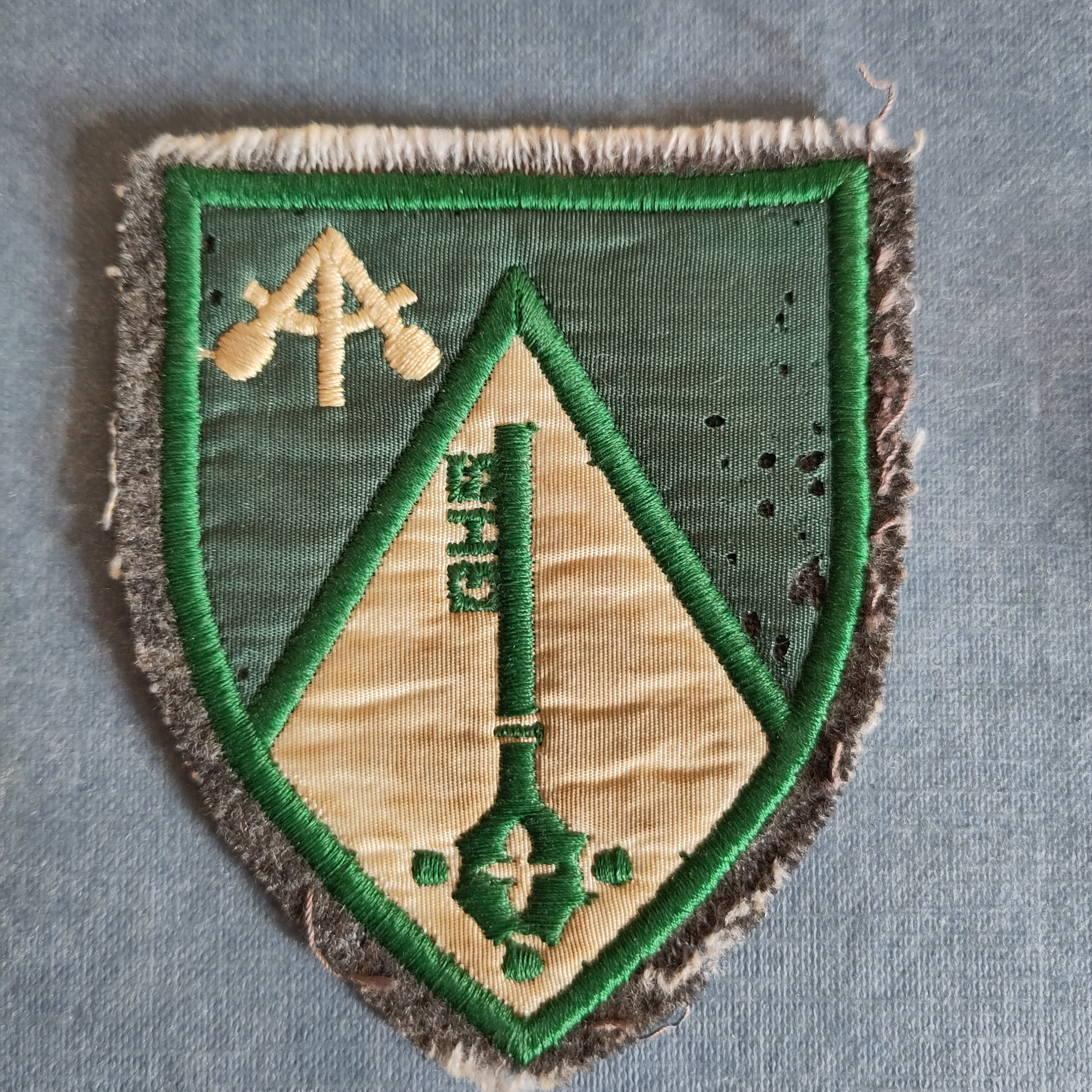
Blazer badge worn by pupil 1969–74.
