= Benhill Estate =

Housing estate in Sutton, London

Coordinates: 51.368°N 0.190°W

Benhill
- Interactive map of the Benhill area
- Etymology: "Ben Hill" appears on 18th-century maps

General information
- Status: Renovated and regenerated
- Type: Council housing estate
- Location: Sutton, London, Around Brunswick Road, United Kingdom
- Year built: 1965–1974
- Construction started: 1965
- Completed: 1974

Technical details
- Size: 441 homes
- Grounds: Originally built upon woodland

Benhill is a council housing estate in Sutton, London, originally built in the 1960s upon woodland. It is east of Sutton High Street around Brunswick Road. The estate was later renovated and regenerated.

The name "Ben Hill" appears on 18th century maps. The wider surrounding area whose initial development of large villas dates from Victorian times was intended for the upper middle class, whereas nearby Newtown – built around the same time as Benhill – was intended for the lower class. Construction began in 1852. However, development of it was slow and by 1913 there were still many empty building plots.

The estate was built from 1965 to 1974 and has 441 homes.

One of its residents, Gerard 'Jed' Edge, had a picture of him selected as part of the 2009 BP Portrait Award exhibition and supplied snakes for the Steven Spielberg film Raiders of the Lost Ark. He died on 11 April, 2013, after his flat in Benhill Wood Road caught fire.
