= Sutton, London =

Town in London, England

Coordinates: 51.3656°N 0.1963°W

Sutton
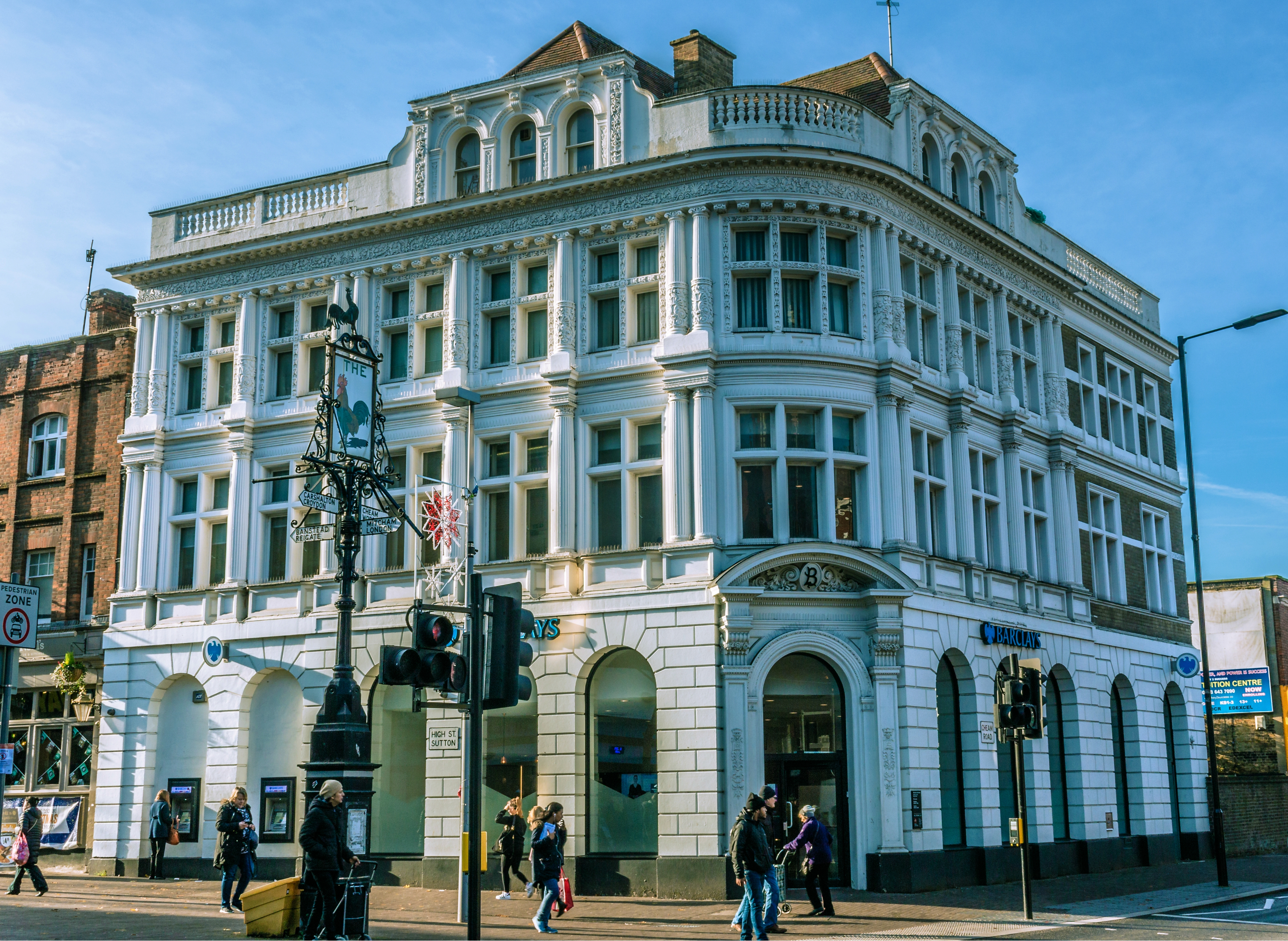
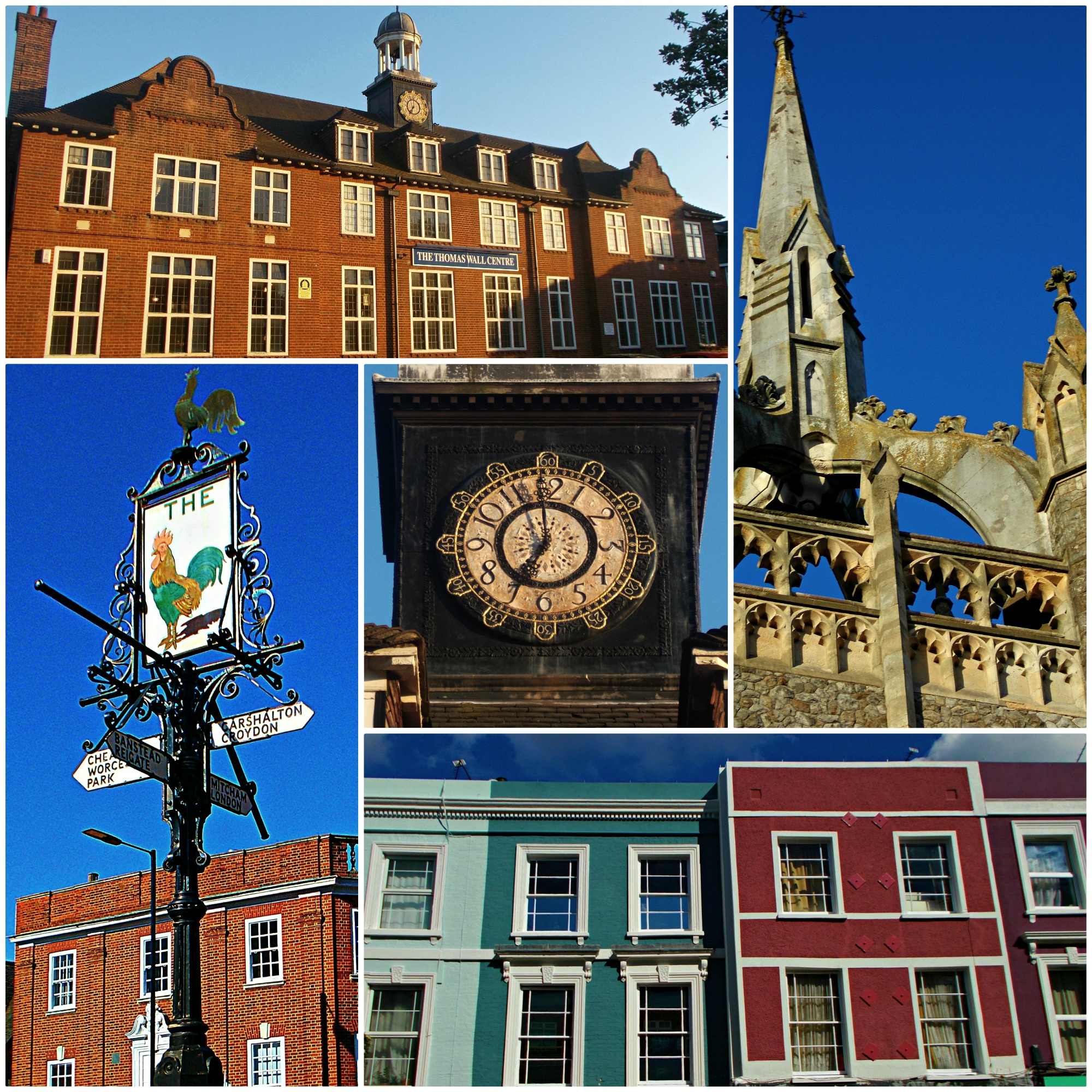
- From top, left to right: The Barclays Bank Building; Thomas Wall Centre and clock; Trinity Church spire; old inn sign above town centre crossroads; multicoloured facades in Sutton High Street

- Location within Greater London
- Population: 58,880 (2021)
- OS grid reference: TQ255645
  - Charing Cross: 10 mi (16 km) NNE
- London borough: Sutton
- Ceremonial county: Greater London
- Region: London
- Country: England
- Sovereign state: United Kingdom
- Post town: SUTTON
- Postcode district: SM1, SM2, SM3
- Dialling code: 020
- Police: Metropolitan
- Fire: London
- Ambulance: London
- UK Parliament: Sutton and Cheam
- London Assembly: Croydon and Sutton

Sutton is a town in the London Borough of Sutton in South London, England. It is the administrative headquarters of the Outer London borough. It is 10 miles (16 km) south-southwest of Charing Cross, one of the fourteen metropolitan centres in the London Plan.

An ancient parish originally in the county of Surrey, Sutton is recorded in the Domesday Book of 1086 as having two churches and about 30 houses. Its location on the London to Brighton turnpike from 1755 led to the opening of coaching inns, spurring its growth as a village. When it was connected to Central London by rail in 1847, it began to grow into a town, and it expanded further in the 20th century. It became a municipal borough with Cheam in 1934, and became part of Greater London in 1965.

Sutton has the largest library in the borough, several works of public art and four conservation areas. It is home to several large international companies and the sixth most important shopping area in London, centred on Sutton High Street. Sutton railway station is the largest station in the borough, offering frequent services by Southern and Govia Thameslink to Central London and other destinations, including Wimbledon and St Albans. It is home to the Royal Marsden Hospital and the Institute of Cancer Research.

Future plans for Sutton as of 2024 include creating the world's second largest cancer research campus and improving connectivity to central London and the London Underground through the Sutton Link tram project (currently awaiting funding).

== Geography ==
=== Geology, soil and elevations ===
Sutton is one of several towns located on a narrow bed of Thanet Sands which extends from Croydon in the east, to Epsom in the west. To the south of this belt is chalk of the North Downs, and to the north is clay. The southern part of the town is on the lower slopes of the North Downs. The belt of Thanet sands allowed wells to provide clean water, and this attracted settlements from a very early date. The Sutton and Cheam Water Company began operations in 1864, and by 1900 had built 142 miles of mains. The company merged with the East Surrey Water Company in 1996 to form Sutton and East Surrey Water.

Elevations in and around the town range from 115 metres (377 ft) AOD in Belmont to 23 metres (75 ft) in Sutton Common, at the start of the Pyl Brook stream.

=== Location ===
Sutton has formed part of Greater London since 1965. The town is often referred to as "Sutton", "Sutton, London", or "Sutton, Surrey" for mailing addresses. Surrey was the former Postal County and remains the historic or traditional county in which Sutton lies. This is because Greater London was formally created in 1965, and county boundaries were changed in 1974. However, the General Post Office had already established an independent system for defining the UK's Postcode Areas to ensure efficient mail sorting. Royal Mail's Flexible Addressing policy allows for these variations. If Sutton were to join the London postal district, it would fall under the SW postcode area and be one of the following: SW21, SW22, or SW23. There is another, much smaller Sutton in Surrey, near Dorking. Sutton mainline railway station is known as "Sutton (London)" by Southern (Govia Thameslink Railway).

Its location is approximately 10 miles (16 km) south-southwest of Charing Cross, London and 11 miles (18 km) due southwest of the City of London, placing it within easy reach of Central London. Sutton is also approximately 4.2 miles (6.8 km) west of Croydon, London, 3.8 miles (6.1 km) north-east of Epsom, Surrey, and 5.8 miles (9.3 km) south-east of Kingston upon Thames, London.

=== Green spaces ===
In addition to the St Nicholas church grounds, there are two areas of green space within the town centre, Sutton Green and Manor Park.

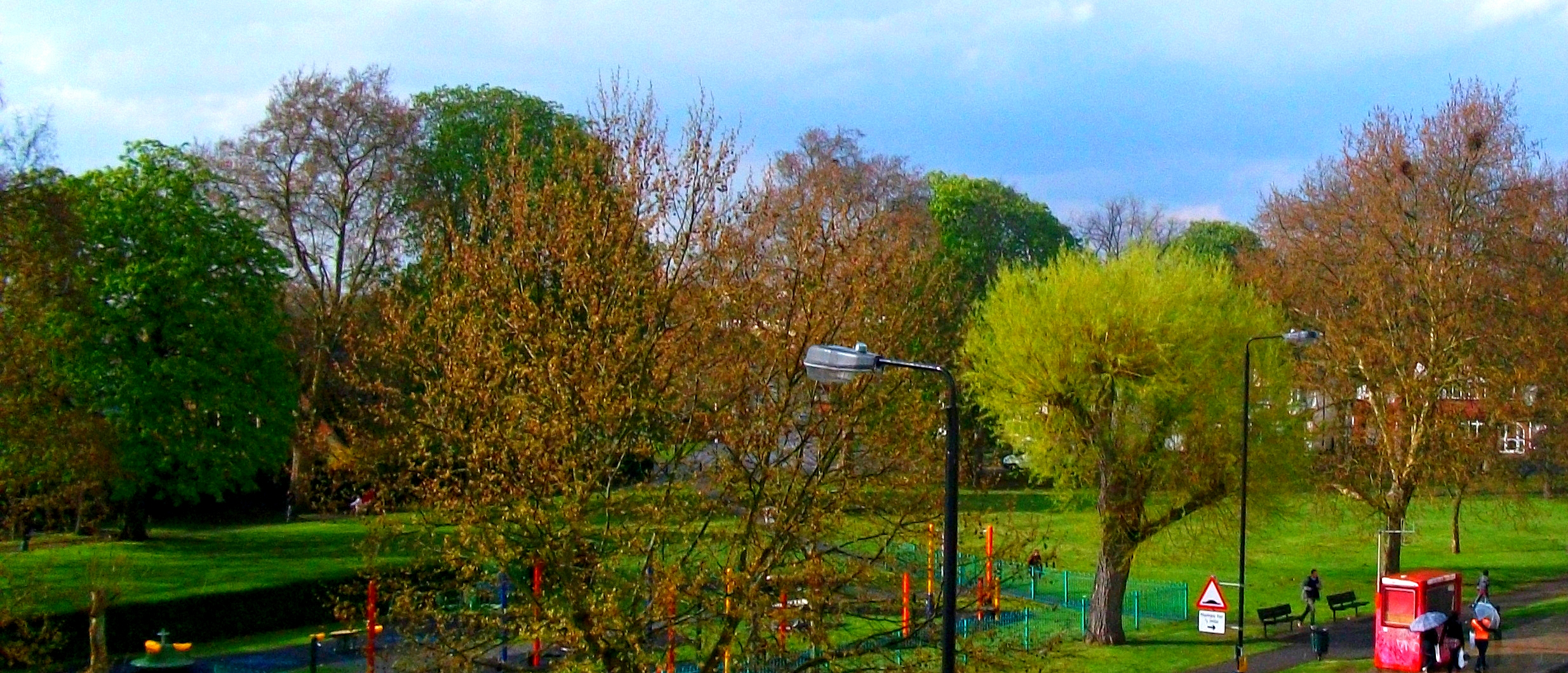
Sutton Green in the Spring, seen from above

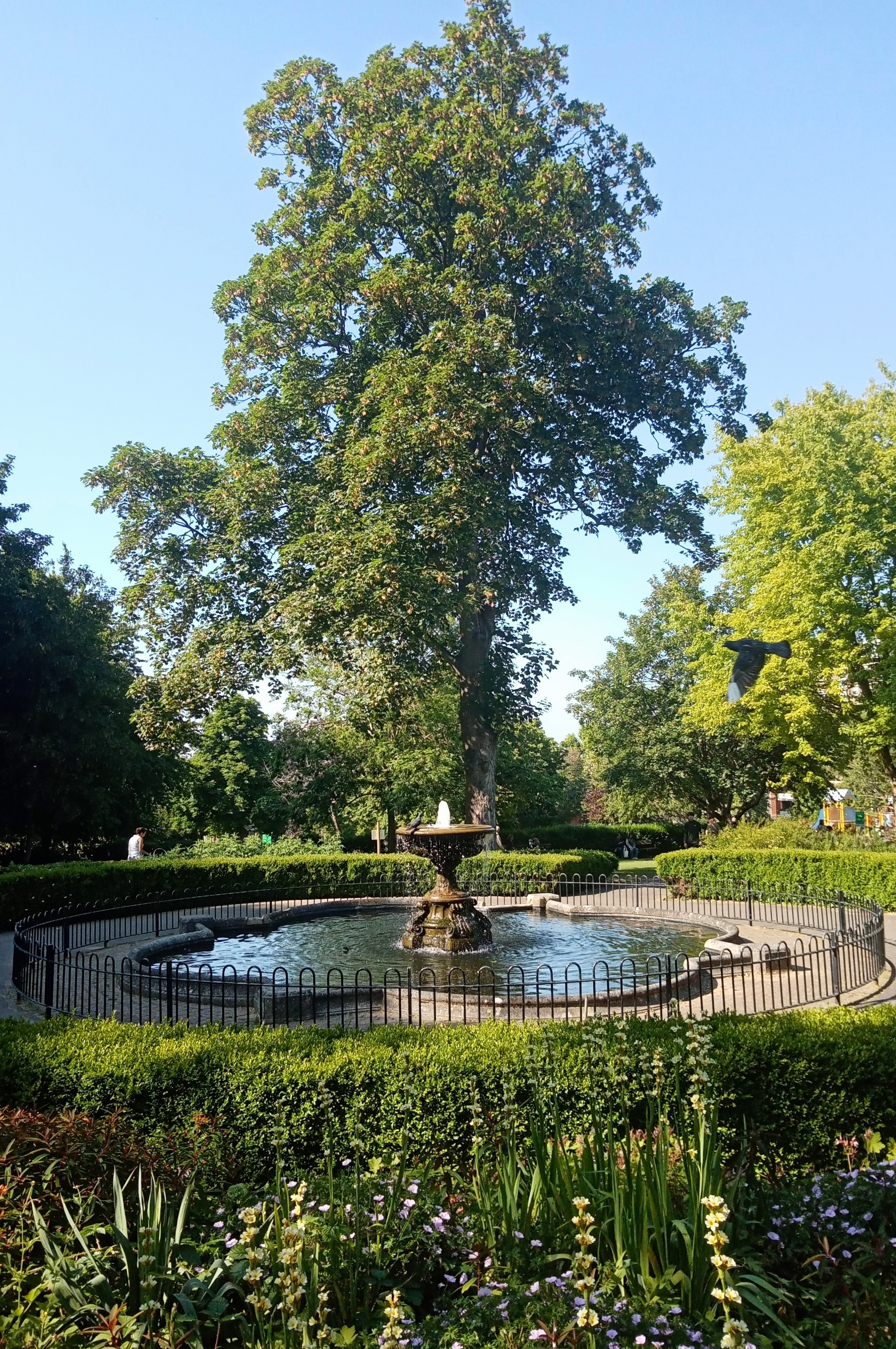
Fountain, Manor Park

Sutton Green is at the northern end of Sutton High Street, near All Saints Church. It is bordered by a row of detached Victorian villas to the west, the High Street to the east and Bushey Road to the south. The green dates from 1810, when it was awarded to the residents of Sutton under the Sutton Common Enclosure Award. Victoria Gardens, a smaller area of green space which once included a pond, lies across the road from Sutton Green.

To the north of Sutton Green are Rose Hill Park East and Rose Hill Park West, to the east and west respectively of the main thoroughfare Angel Hill/Rosehill. Rose Hill Park East contains Greenshaw Woods, for which Greenshaw High School is named.

Manor Park lies opposite the police station. It was opened by the chairman of the then Sutton Urban District Council in 1914, and its fountain was added in 1924–1925. A plaque on the pool surround states: "This fountain was presented to the town by Councillor Chas Yates Chairman of Sutton U.D.C.1924–25"

The park is the site of the Sutton War Memorial, which was unveiled in 1921 by Sir Ralph Forster, a resident whose son had died in the war. The memorial, in portland stone, consists of a large ornamental cross on a plinth. 524 men who died in the First World War are commemorated on the memorial. There are four depictions of angels on the plinth overlooking the park.

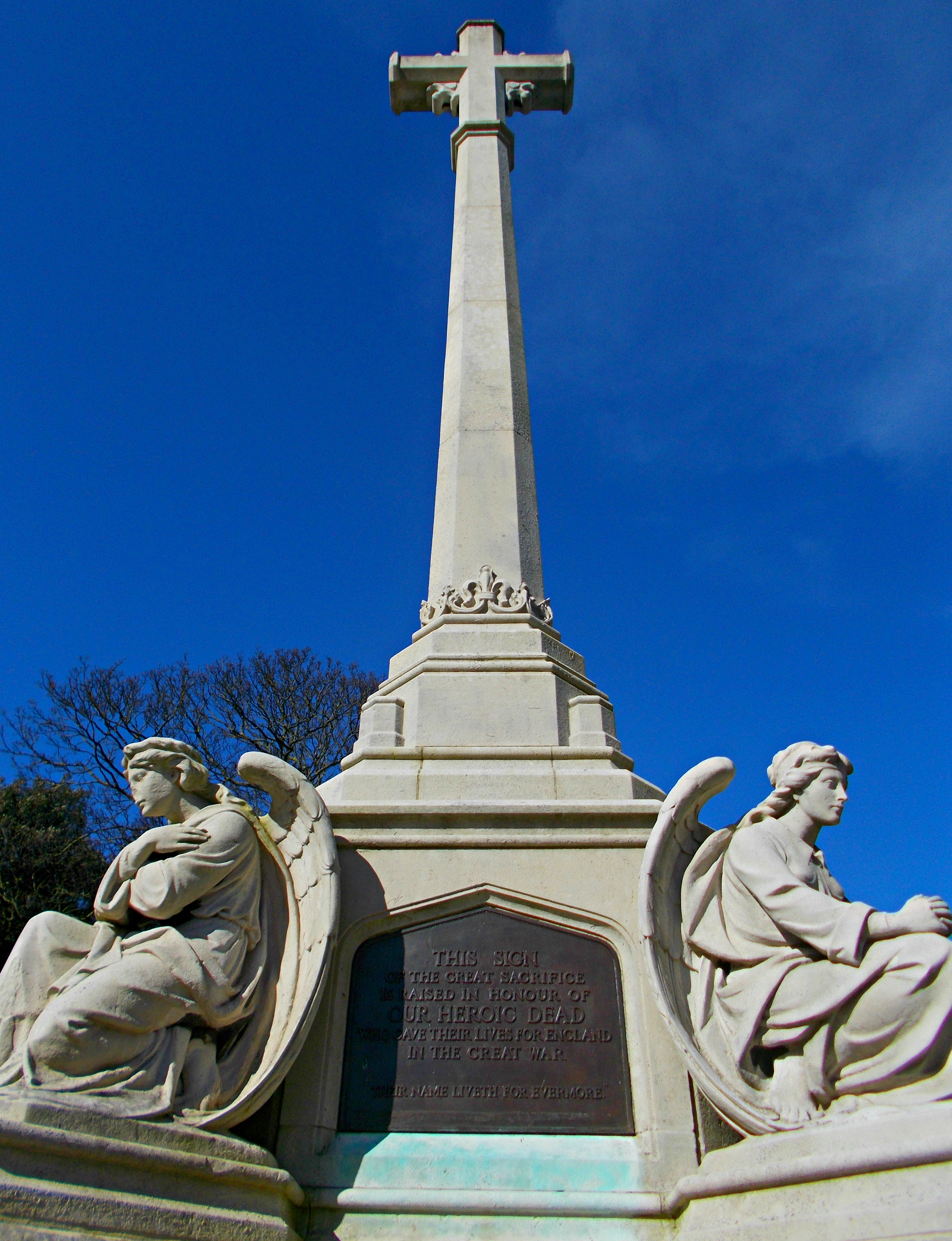
Sutton War Memorial

The current Manor Park Café opened in October 2010. It is eco-friendly and has a range of environmental features, including its straw-bale construction, giving the building a potential lifespan of over 200 years. It was designed by Amazonails Architectura, and constructed by a mixed team of builders. It was London's first energy-efficient building to use this construction method.

In the south of Sutton starts Banstead Downs, which extends for around a mile south towards neighbouring Banstead. Banstead Downs is a large Site of Special Scientific Interest, covering 430 acres (170 ha). Banstead Golf Course is on the northern slopes.

Local Nature Reserves Sutton contains two Local Nature Reserves.

- The Anton Crescent Wetland reserve has ponds, willow carr and reedbeds. It provides a habitat for birds such as the green sandpiper and common snipe.
- Devonshire Avenue Nature Area is a Site of Borough Importance for Nature Conservation, Grade II. It is mainly neutral grassland. A notable species is the small blue butterfly, which is rare in the borough.

== History ==
=== Origin of the name ===
The placename Sutton is recorded in the 1086 Domesday Book as Sudtone. It is formed from Old English 'sūth' and 'tūn', meaning 'south farm'.

=== Pre 1700 ===
Archaeological finds in the region date back thousands of years, including the excavation of a Roman villa in Beddington. An implement from the Neolithic age was found in Sutton town centre. The Roman road of Stane Street formed part of the northern boundary of the parish.

Sutton was recorded as Sudtone in a charter of Chertsey Abbey believed to date from the late 7th century, when the Manor was granted to the Abbot of Chertsey by Frithwald, Governor of Surrey. Some sources state the name as Suthtone or Sudtana.

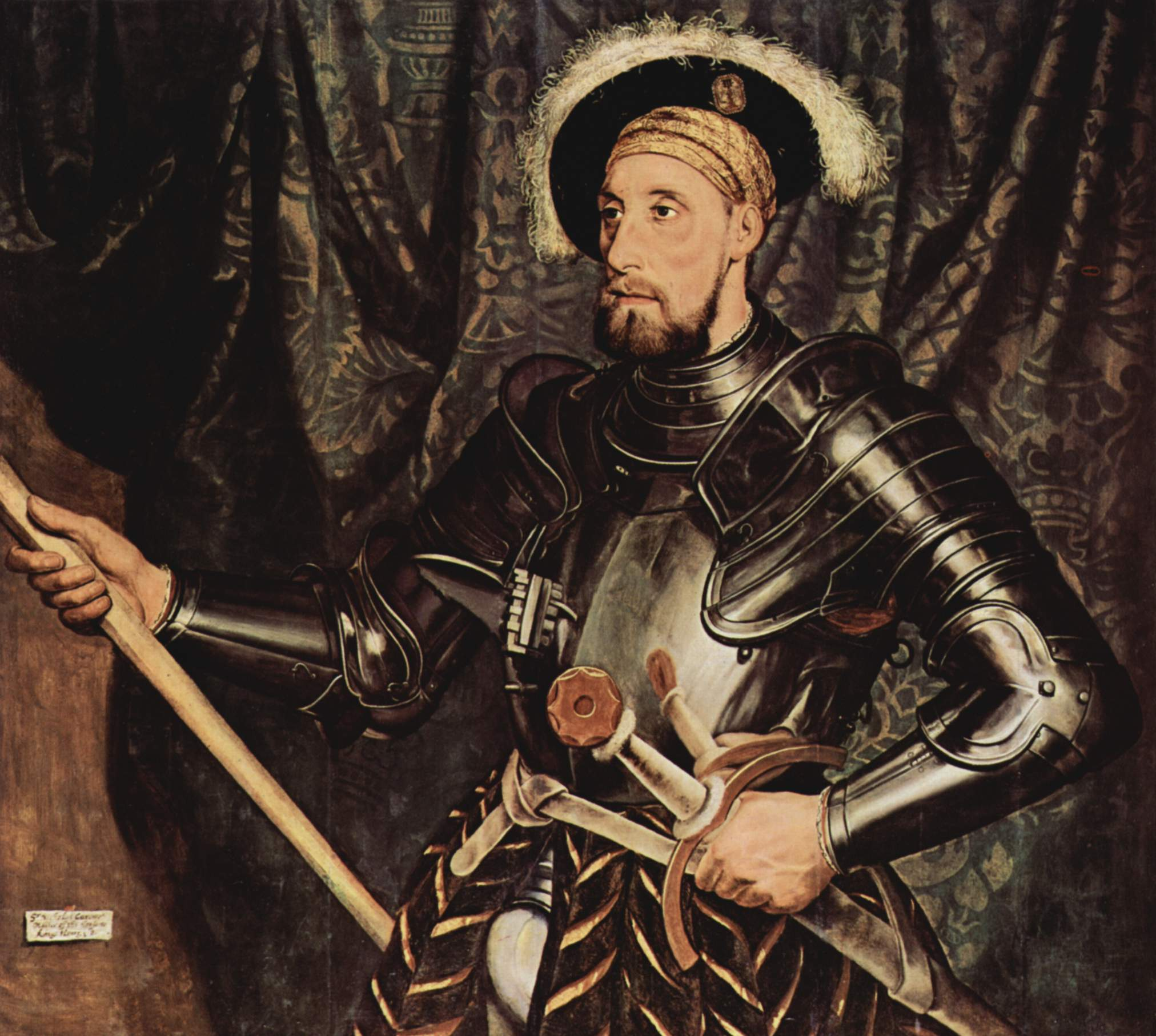
Sir Nicholas Carew

The 1086 Domesday Book records Sutton as spanning about 800 acres, and having about 30 houses and 200 people. It states that the Abbot of Chertsey held the manor. In 1538 it was sold to King Henry VIII and granted to Sir Nicholas Carew of Beddington. When Sir Nicholas was sentenced to death in 1539, the King seized the manor. Queen Mary I restored it to Francis, son of Sir Nicholas. It later became a Crown possession again until King Charles II granted it to the Duke of Portland, who sold it in 1669. It changed hands regularly thereafter.

The Cock Hotel in 1789.

From the time of Domesday until the 19th century, Sutton formed a parish in the Wallington hundred of Surrey in the feudal system.

Jose Glover, who was Rector of Sutton from 1628 to 1636, became a pioneer of printing in the English colonies of North America and one of the people instrumental in establishing Harvard College in the 1630s.

=== 1700 to 1900 ===
The road from London to Banstead Downs, through Sutton, was a haven for highwaymen in the 18th century. In 1755, two turnpike roads, which met at Sutton, were built: one from London to Brighton (Brighton Road), the other from Carshalton to Ewell (Cheam Road). The toll bars for the roads were originally located by the Cock Hotel, a coaching inn at the junction. The inn's sign straddled the Brighton road.

The London to Brighton stagecoach began in 1760, and the Cock Hotel was the 9am stop for coaches leaving the city. Regular contact beyond the town brought expansion and sophistication. Small businesses opened up, at first related to travellers and later to provide goods for neighbouring areas. The toll bars moved away from the junction as Sutton expanded, remaining in use until 1882.

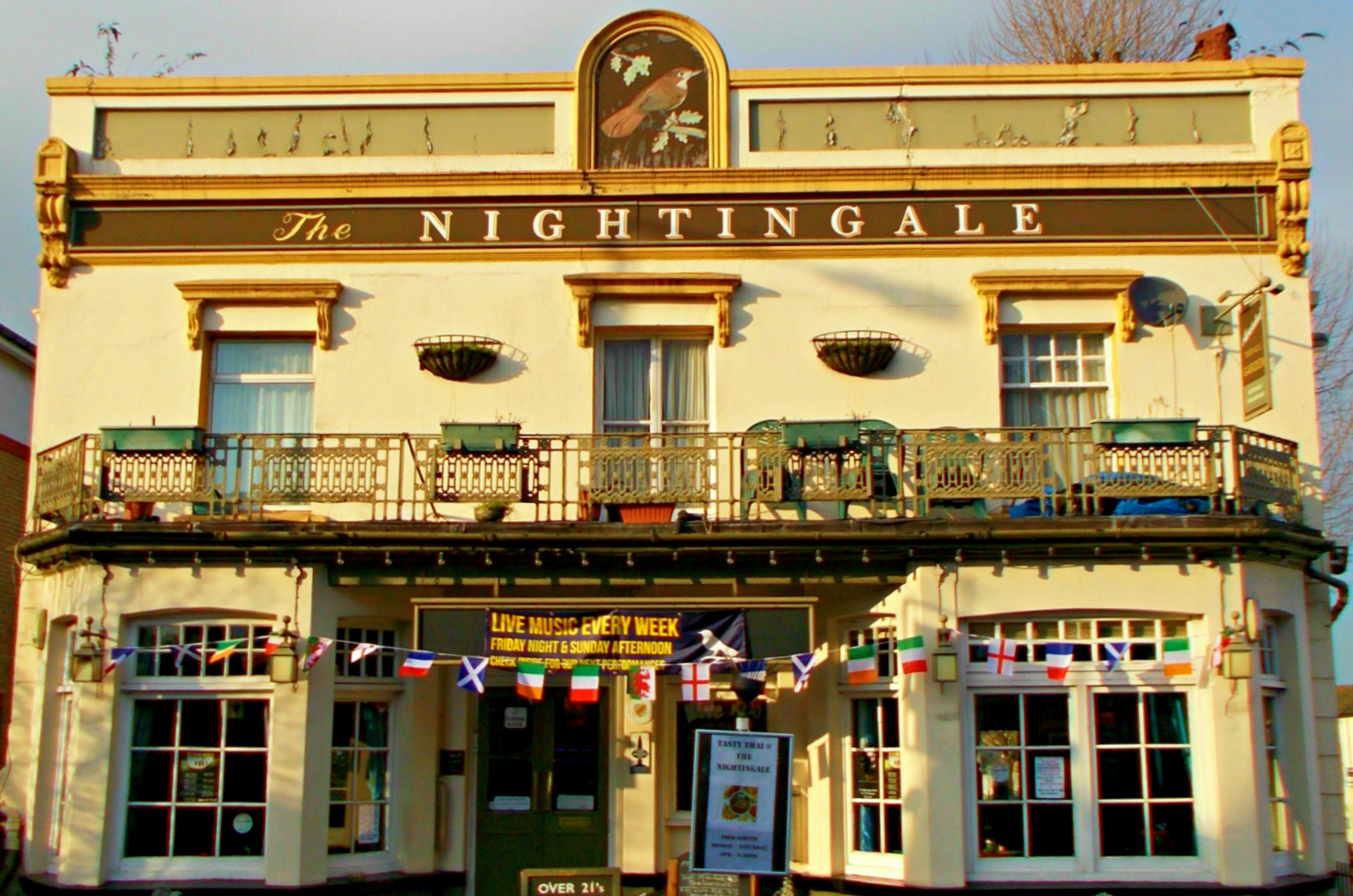
The Nightingale pub (formerly the Jenny Lind)

Sutton railway station was opened in 1847. Following the arrival of the new, fast link to central London, Sutton's population more than doubled between 1851 and 1861, and the village became a town. New housing was built in the Lind Road area, and called "New Town". A pub built in 1854 on the corner of Lind Road was named the Jenny Lind, after the famous Swedish opera singer Johanna Maria Lind, who was visiting friends in the area in 1847 and enchanted locals with her singing. It has recently been renamed the Nightingale, also after the singer, who was known as the Swedish Nightingale.

In about 1852 a residential school was built alongside the Sutton to Epsom Downs railway near Brighton Road. The building was designed by Edwin Nash and contained administrative, dining, dormitory and teaching areas. Boys were taught manual skills like shoemaking and metal working. Girls were taught such skills as needle work, laundry work, and ironing with a view to making them good servants, wives and mothers. Up to 1856, when large parts of it were destroyed by fire, the boys' and girls' sections were on the same site but after 1856 the girls' were moved into a new building on the other side of the railway in Banstead Road (now called Cotswold Road).

Sutton Water Company was incorporated in 1863, and the provision of water mains allowed houses to be built outside the Thanet Sands area. The Lord of the Manor, Mr Thomas Alcock, sold land for housing, and Sutton's population more than doubled again between 1861 and 1871, spurred by the development of upmarket Benhilton in north Sutton.

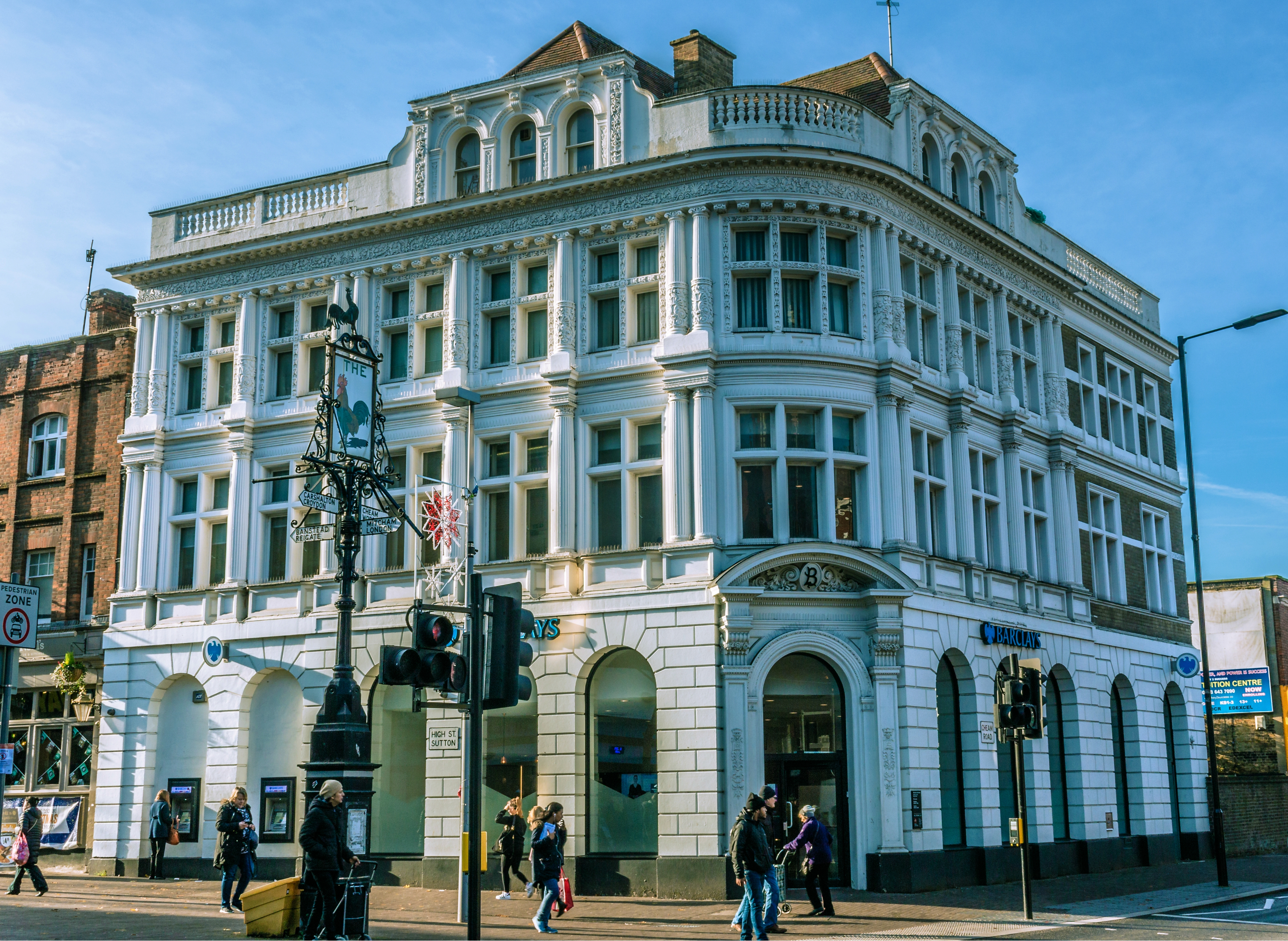
Bank at the historic crossroads

The High Street near the top was known as Cock Hill until the 1880s – the shops on the east side were built in 1880, ten years after those on the west side. The grand and decorative London and Provincial Bank building (now home to Barclays Bank) was built overlooking the historic crossroads in 1894. Designed in the French Renaissance architectural style, it is four storeys tall and forms a prominent local landmark. There is a series of arches at ground level, and an ornate entrance where the roads meet.

In 1884 Sutton High School for Girls was founded by the then Girls' Public Day School Trust.

In 1899 Sutton County Grammar School (now Sutton Grammar School for Boys) opened.

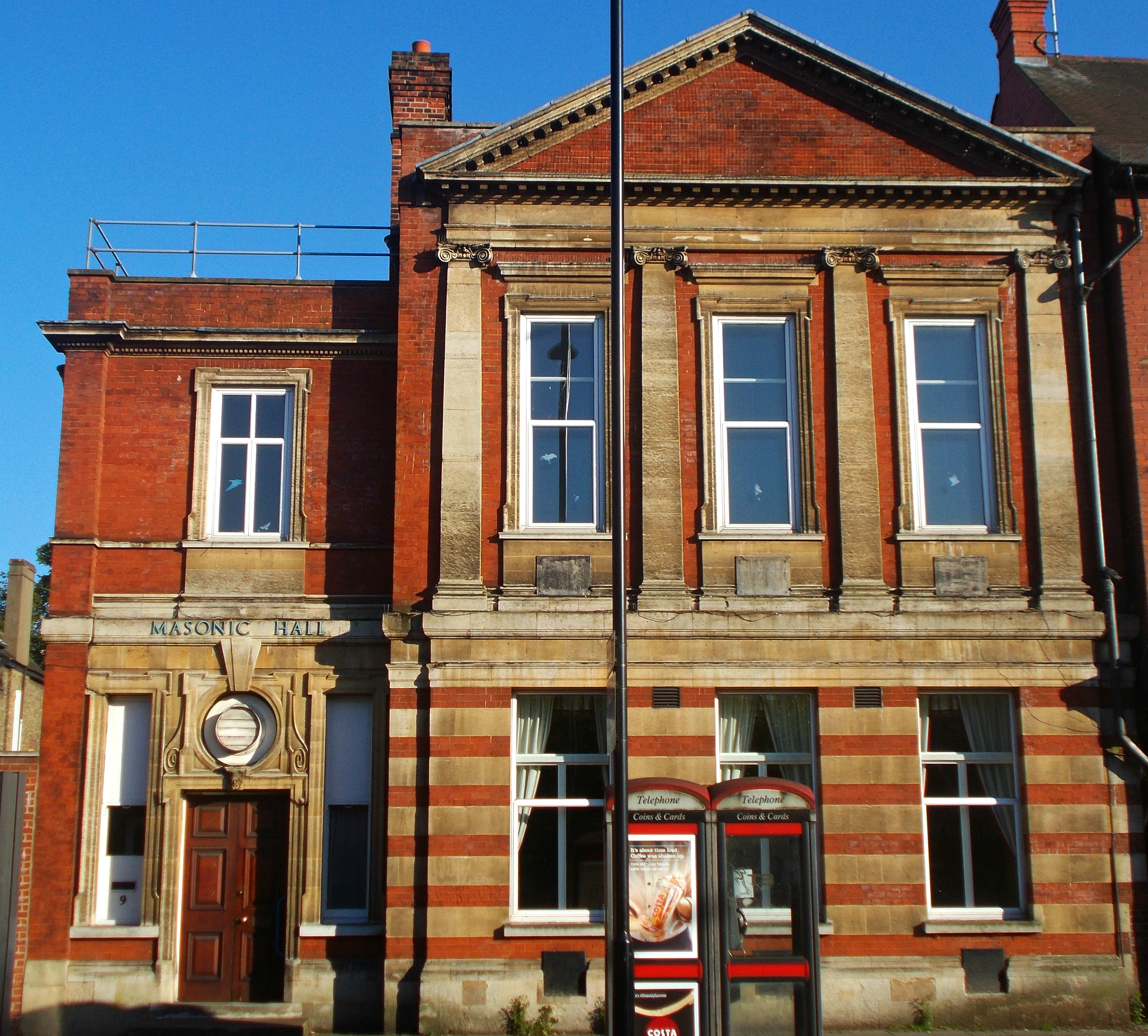
Sutton Masonic Hall

In 1897 Sutton Masonic Hall was built in Grove Road. Freemasons have met there since its foundation, apart during World War II when the military requisitioned it and it served as a shelter for displaced people.

In 1898 a new, larger Cock Hotel replaced the original one.

=== 20th century ===
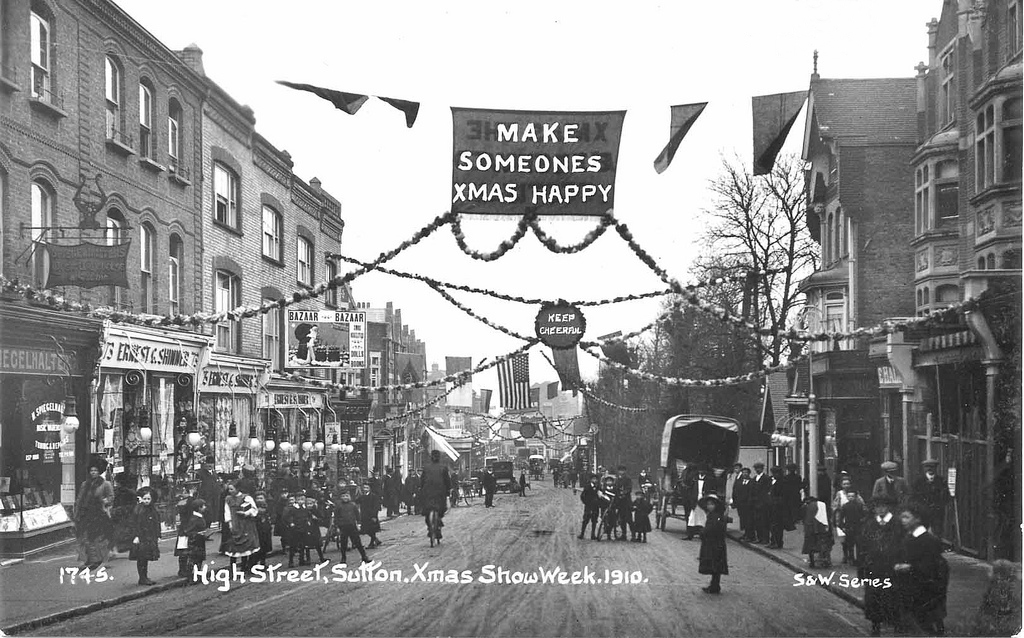
Sutton High St., Christmas, 1910

By 1901, the town's population had reached 17,223 as further housing was built and the High Street was developed.

In 1902 the Banstead Road site of the South Metropolitan Industrial school was bought by the Metropolitan Asylums Board. The site later became the Downs Schools and then the Downs Hospital. It is now shared between the Royal Marsden and Sutton Hospitals, the Institute of Cancer Research, and the site of a new school to be opened in 2019.

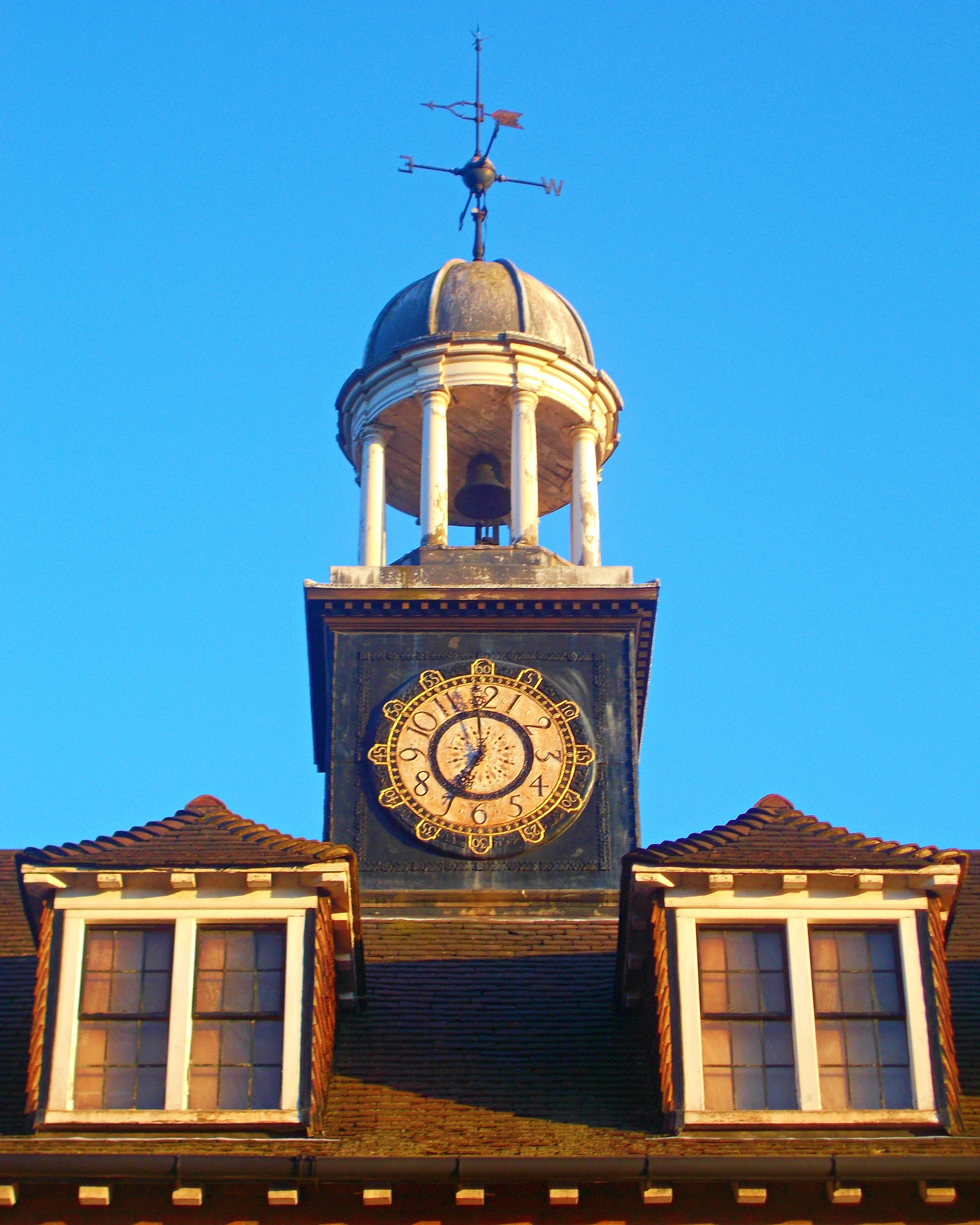
The Thomas Wall Centre clock

The Sutton Adult School and Institute opened in 1910 in a large Edwardian building in Benhill Avenue. It later became the Thomas Wall Centre, named after the area's benefactor of Wall's sausage and ice cream fame. Thomas Wall's lack of education led to a desire to encourage learning in others, resulting in the establishment of a trust and the construction of the institute. The adult school is said to have had the best premises in the UK: by 1915 there were social clubs, a library, clubs for maternity and horticulture, debating and temperance societies, a legal advice committee, bible study and English literature classes, and what was claimed to be the finest public gymnasium in southern England.

During World War II bombing was not as heavy as in central London – 434 bombs in total were dropped on Sutton and Cheam, and the Commonwealth War Graves Commission lists 187 civilian casualties.

In 1950, in order to widen the High Street, the Cock Hotel was demolished. However, the inn sign and its fingerposts survive, overlooking the historic crossroads. The sign and fingerposts were given Grade II listed status by English Heritage on 18 April 2018.

In 1959 a local resident, George Edgar Alcock, started a campaign to preserve a unique avenue of copper beech trees. This campaign led the same year to the formation of the Sutton and Cheam Society, a local amenity group. A plaque commemorating Mr Alcock's life is situated at the junction of Christchurch Park with Brighton Road.

== Governance ==
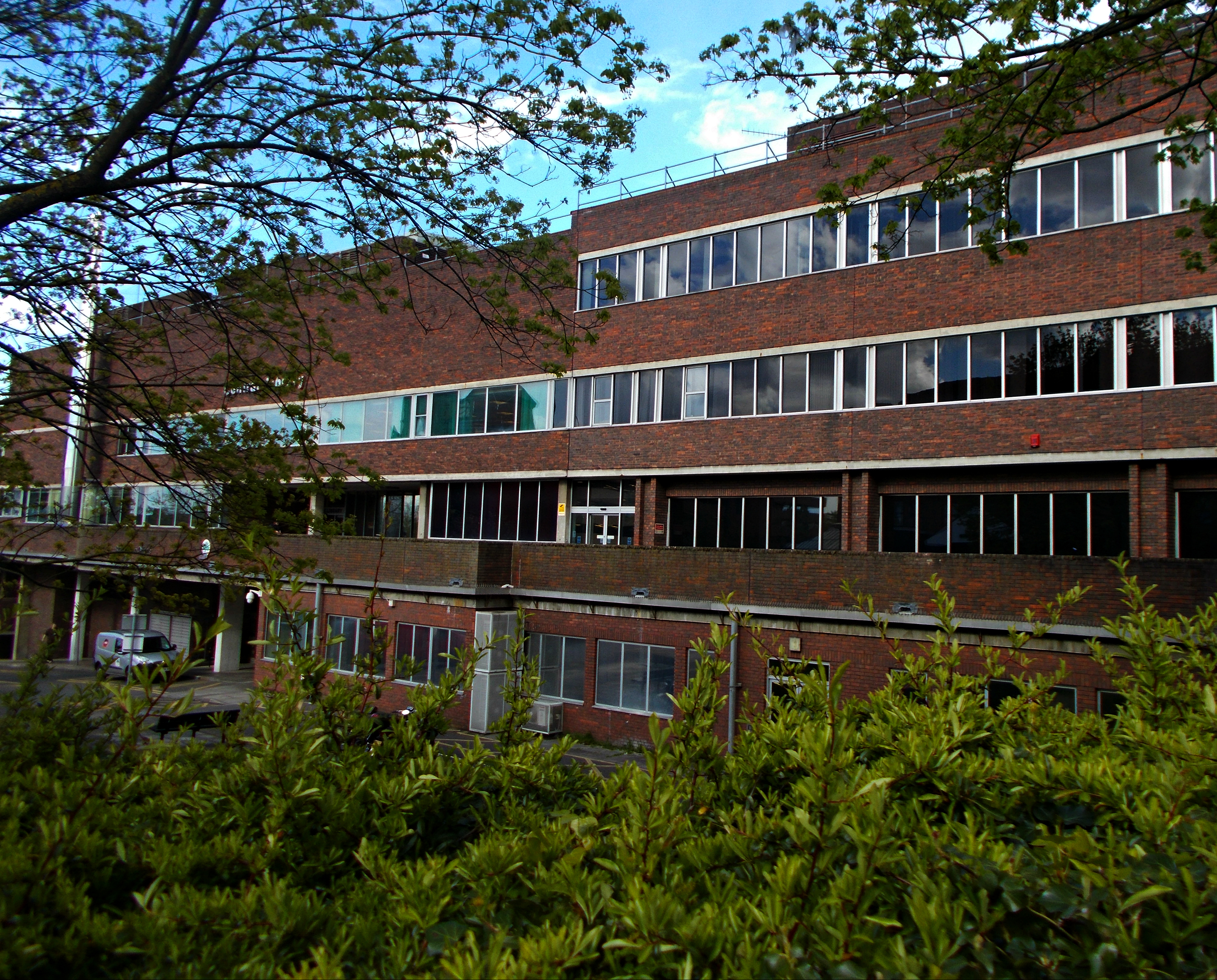
Sutton Civic Offices, the headquarters of the London Borough of Sutton

Sutton came within the area of the Metropolitan Police District in 1840. The parish of Sutton adopted the Local Government Act 1858 in 1882 and a local board was formed to govern the area. The Local Government Act 1894 reformed it as Sutton Urban District.

In 1928 the area of the urban district was expanded to include the parish of Cheam, and renamed Sutton and Cheam. The town became a municipal borough in 1934, and the civil parishes were merged on 1 April 1949. At the 1931 census (the last before the abolition of the parish), Sotton had a population of 27,989. The municipal borough was abolished in 1965 and its former area became part of the London Borough of Sutton in Greater London.

For Westminster elections, Sutton is part of the Sutton and Cheam constituency, formed in 1945. The Member of Parliament is Luke Taylor, of the Liberal Democrats, and has been since the 2024 General Election.

On a local level, the Sutton London Borough Council has been run by a Liberal Democrat majority since 1990. Sutton is divided between four wards: Sutton Central, Sutton North, Sutton South and Sutton West & East Cheam.

== Population and demography ==
Sutton (parish) population
1881	10,334
1891	13,977
1901	17,223
1911	21,270
1921	21,063
1931	27,989
Absorbed by Sutton and Cheam parish ►
source: UK census

Most of Sutton, including the town centre, falls under the SM1 postcode area, though places south of Sutton railway station are part of SM2 instead, and the western part of Sutton Common is in SM3.

The population of the town was counted as 58,880 including the Sutton Central, Sutton South, Sutton North, Sutton West and Belmont Wards in the 2021 United Kingdom census, while the borough overall counted 209,639.

A majority of the town's population is in the middle class ABC1 social group.

== Architecture ==
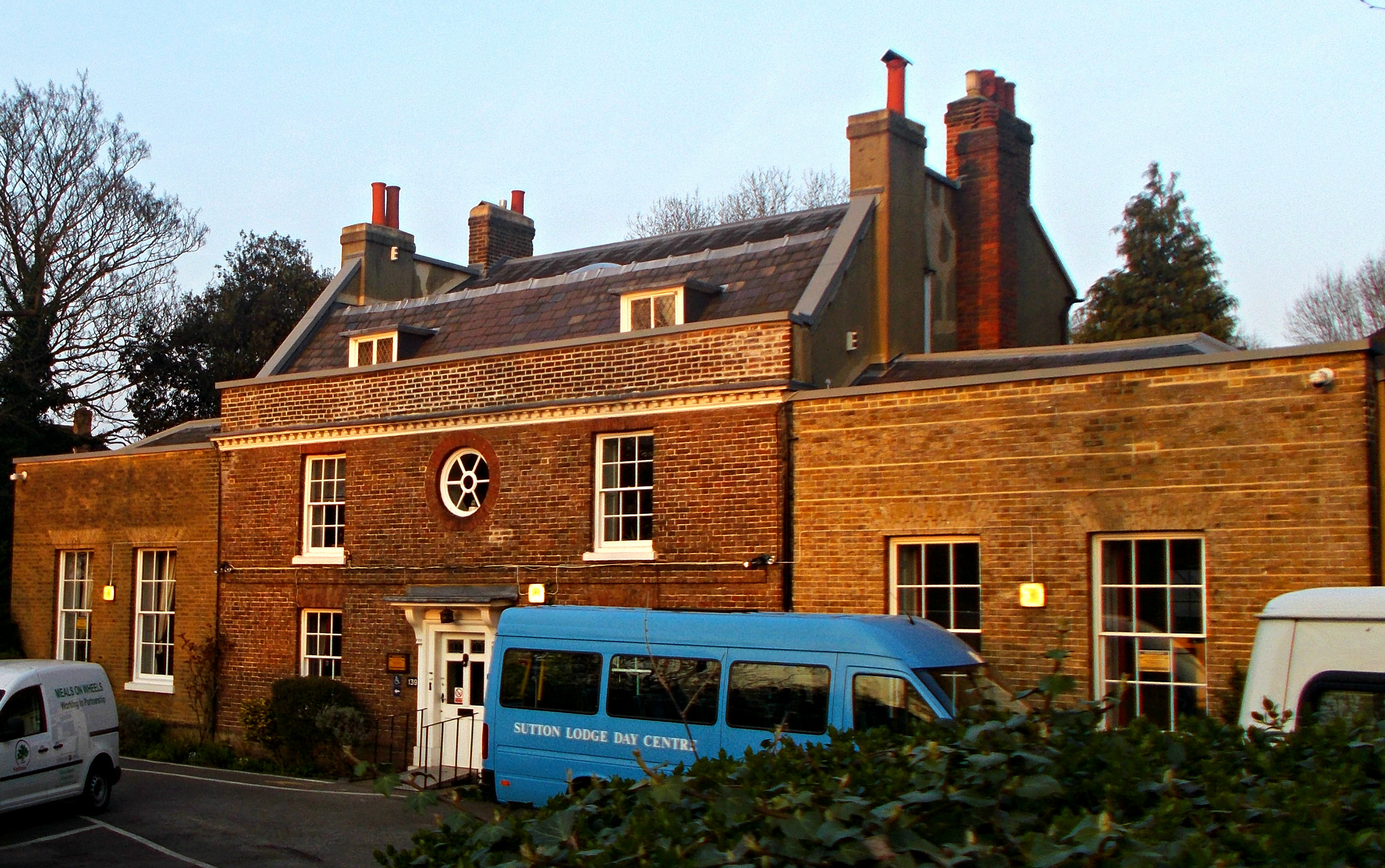
Sutton Lodge, the oldest surviving building in the parish of Sutton

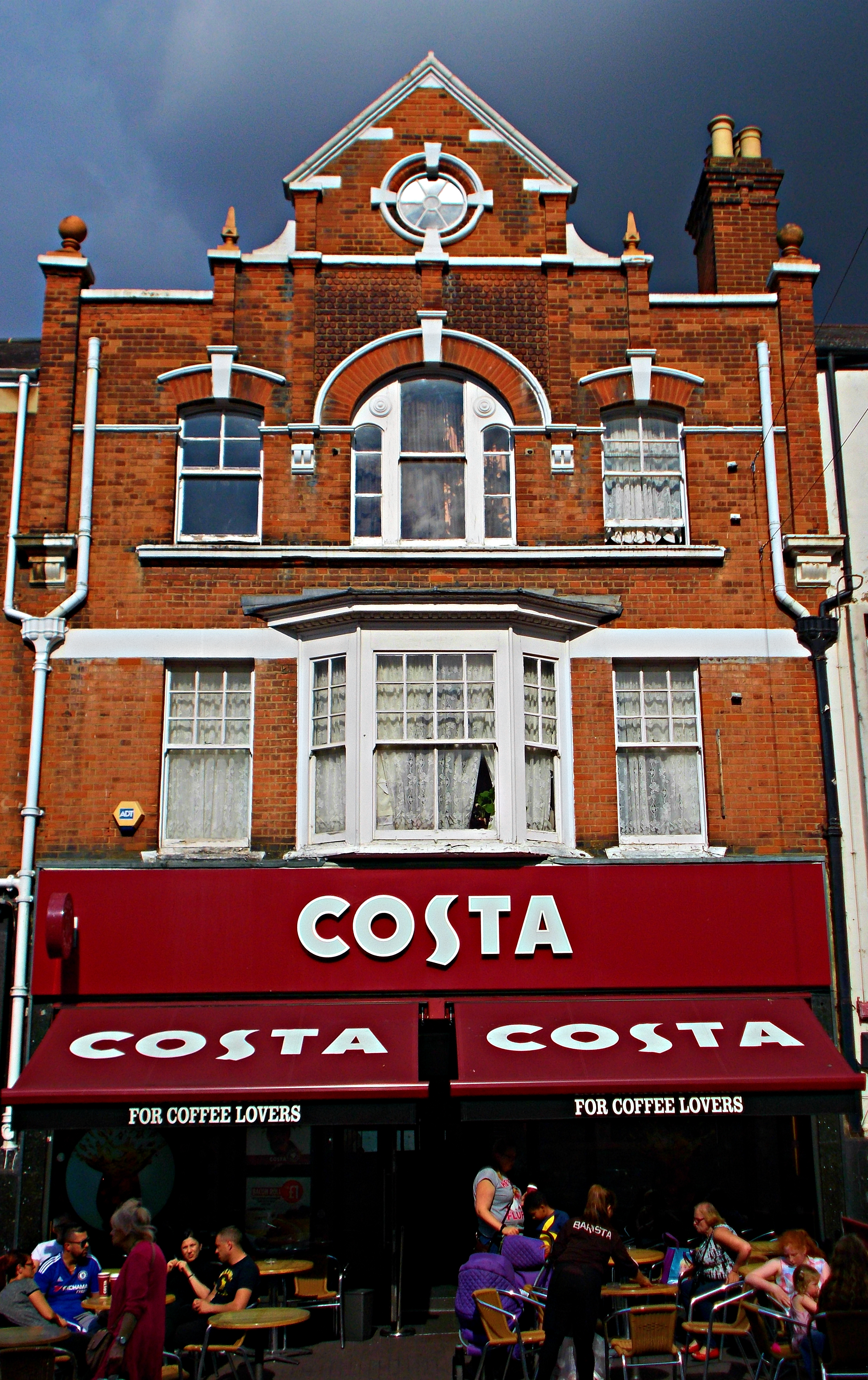
Ornate architecture in Sutton High Street

Sutton is mainly the product of the railways, which arrived in the town in the mid-19th century. So, although it already existed (as a village with coaching inns) in the horse and carriage era, most of the town's earliest architecture is Victorian. A few buildings date from before the Victorian era. The mid-18th century Georgian Sutton Lodge on Brighton Road is thought to be the oldest fully surviving building in the former parish of Sutton. The lodge was initially the farmhouse of the former Sutton Farm. Later, the farmland around the lodge was sold off for house building. The lodge itself survived and was bought by Sutton Council, for use as a day centre. During its early history it may have served as a hideaway for the future King George IV and his mistresses. The building is Grade II listed.

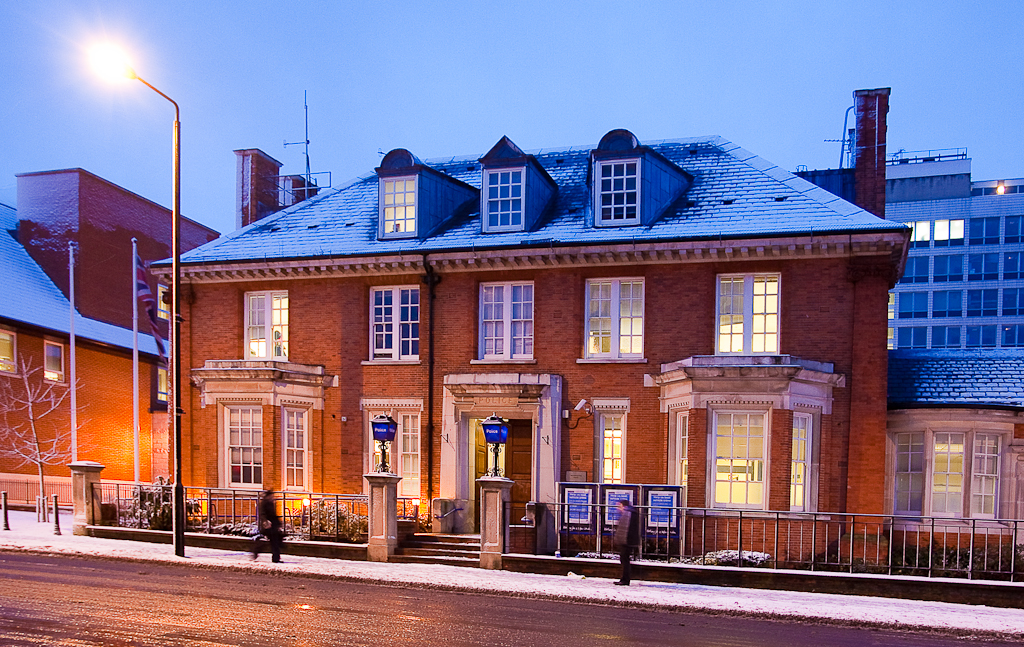
Sutton's Edwardian Police Station

The High Street and the central area housing has a majority of Victorian architecture; Edwardian architecture is also represented, especially among the town's housing stock. Of architectural interest because of its particularly varied style is the Victorian residential quarter east of the high street known as Newtown, where no single developer was in overall charge. The town features more recent architectural styles from the 1930s (including some art deco and moderne).

The most prominent examples of 21st century architecture include the Aspects and Lamborne apartment buildings and the new police station extension. Aspects was created out of a former office building; it was reclad in a terracotta colour and three additional floors were added at the top for penthouses. With a total of eighteen floors, it can be seen from across Sutton. By contrast, the Lamborne was newly built.

In 2003 the extension to Sutton Police Station was completed and officially opened the following year by Commissioner Sir John Stevens. The extension, which is far larger than the original Edwardian listed building to which it is attached, is used by Sutton CID, the criminal justice unit and the borough intelligence unit.

=== Conservation areas ===
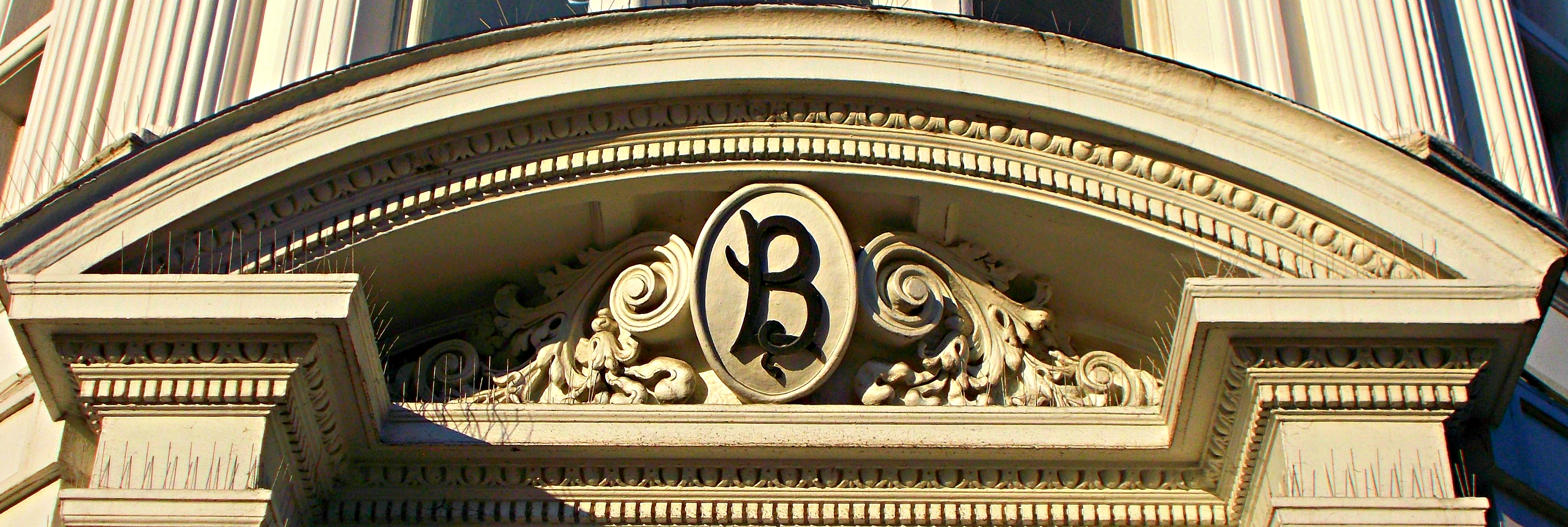
Intricate detailing on the pediment above the entrance to the Barclays Bank building in the Sutton town centre conservation area. (Swipe to view full image in mobile view.)

There are four conservation areas in the town of Sutton (among several others within the wider borough of Sutton). One is in the town centre and the other three are residential. The areas are:

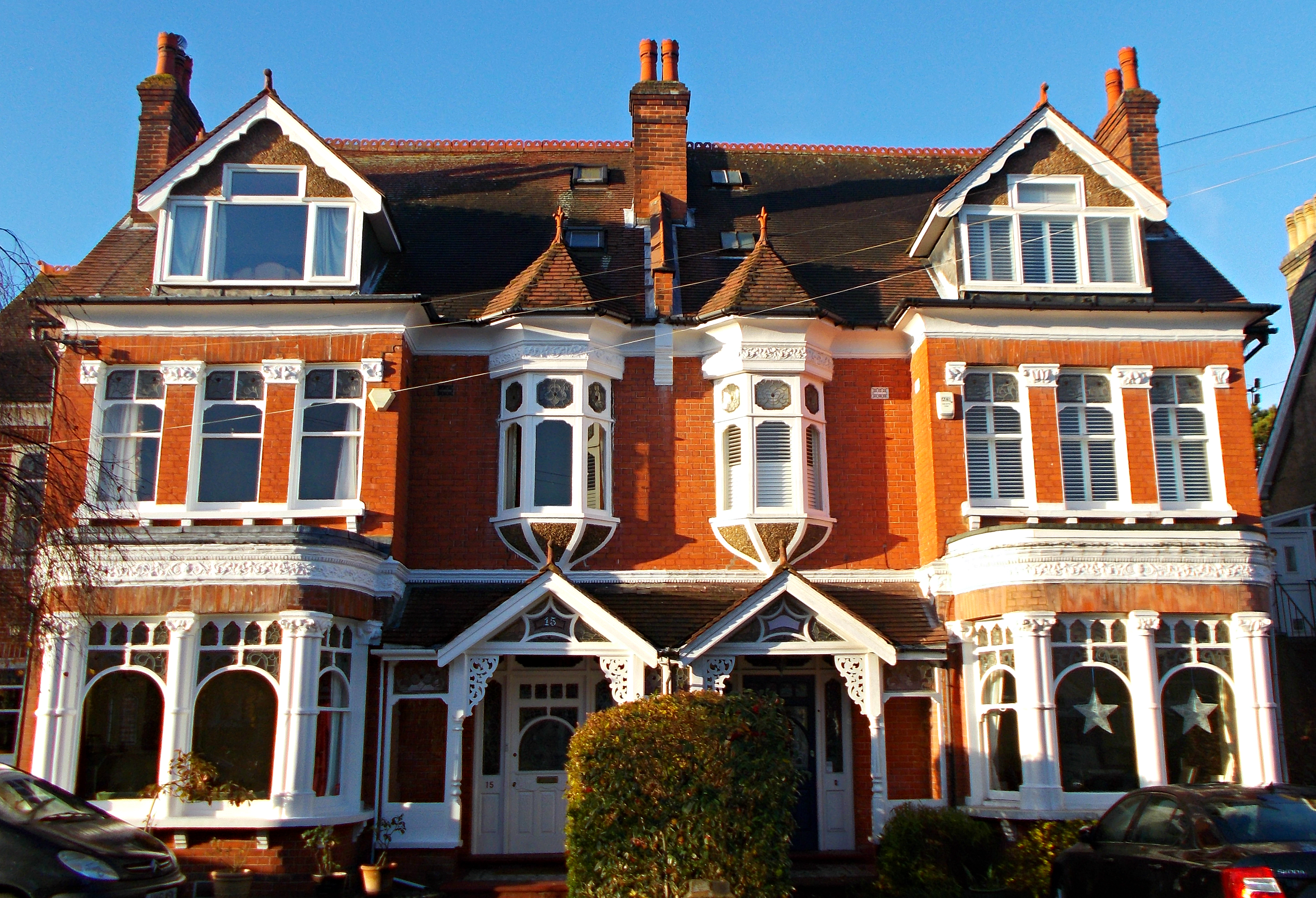

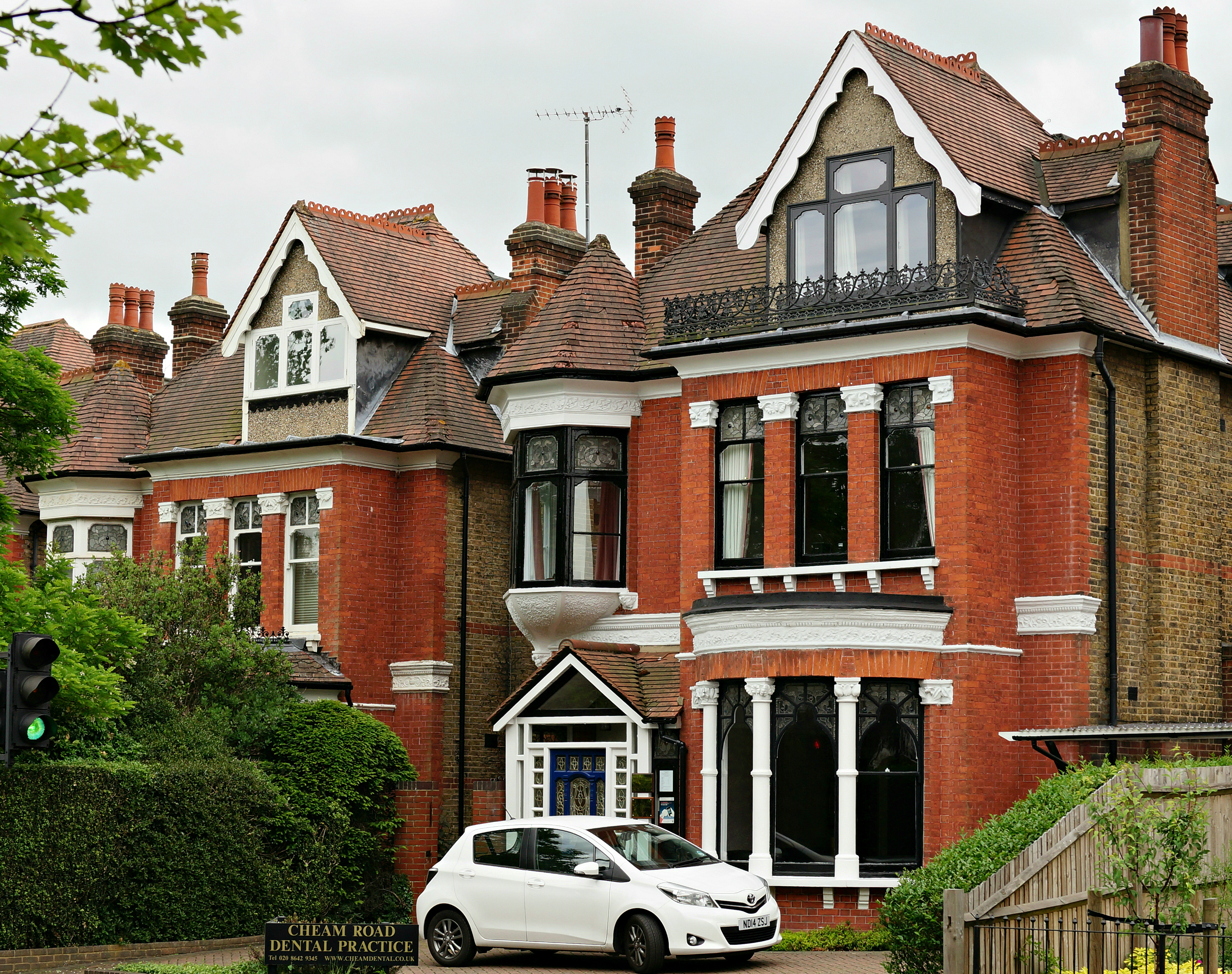
Landseer Road Conservation Area: ornate Edwardian homes in Bridgefield Road (above); and Cheam Rd (below)

- The Sutton Town Centre High Street Crossroads Conservation Area, which was designated in 2011 and is noted for the "vivid, Victorian, polychrome brick and stone façades" of the High Street buildings.
- The Landseer Road Conservation Area of grand, finely detailed, Edwardian villa houses.
- The Grove Avenue Conservation Area of mainly modernist houses.
- The Sutton Garden Suburb Conservation Area, whose homes in the Arts and Crafts style contributed to the garden city movement.

=== Russettings ===
Russettings is a large house built in 1899 on a 3/4-acre plot at 25 Worcester Road. It was among the last of several similar upper-middle-class houses built in the vicinity. It was originally occupied by George Smith and his wife Mary, who was the sister of local benefactor Thomas Wall. Smith had his initials GS put on the façade of the red-brick building, which was designed by Frederick Wheeler in an Arts and Crafts style.

Features include gabled roofs, large chimneys, bay windows, a green copper dome and a porch with a tiled roof and marble floor. With the newly formed London Borough of Sutton in 1965, the house became the Sutton Register Office.

== Places of worship ==
There are three churches in the town centre: Trinity Church and St Nicholas Church on St Nicholas Way and Sutton Baptist Church on Cheam Road.

Other churches in the town include All Saints Church in the north, St Barnabas in the east and Christ Church in the south (all Anglican); and two Roman Catholic churches, Our Lady of the Rosary to the east, and the Church of the Holy Family by Sutton Green. The Salvation Army have a centre in Benhill Avenue. Most recently, Hope Church Sutton was established in November 2015 and meets at Sutton Grammar School.

Sutton Synagogue is located on Cedar Road, south of the town centre.

=== Trinity United Reformed and Methodist Church ===
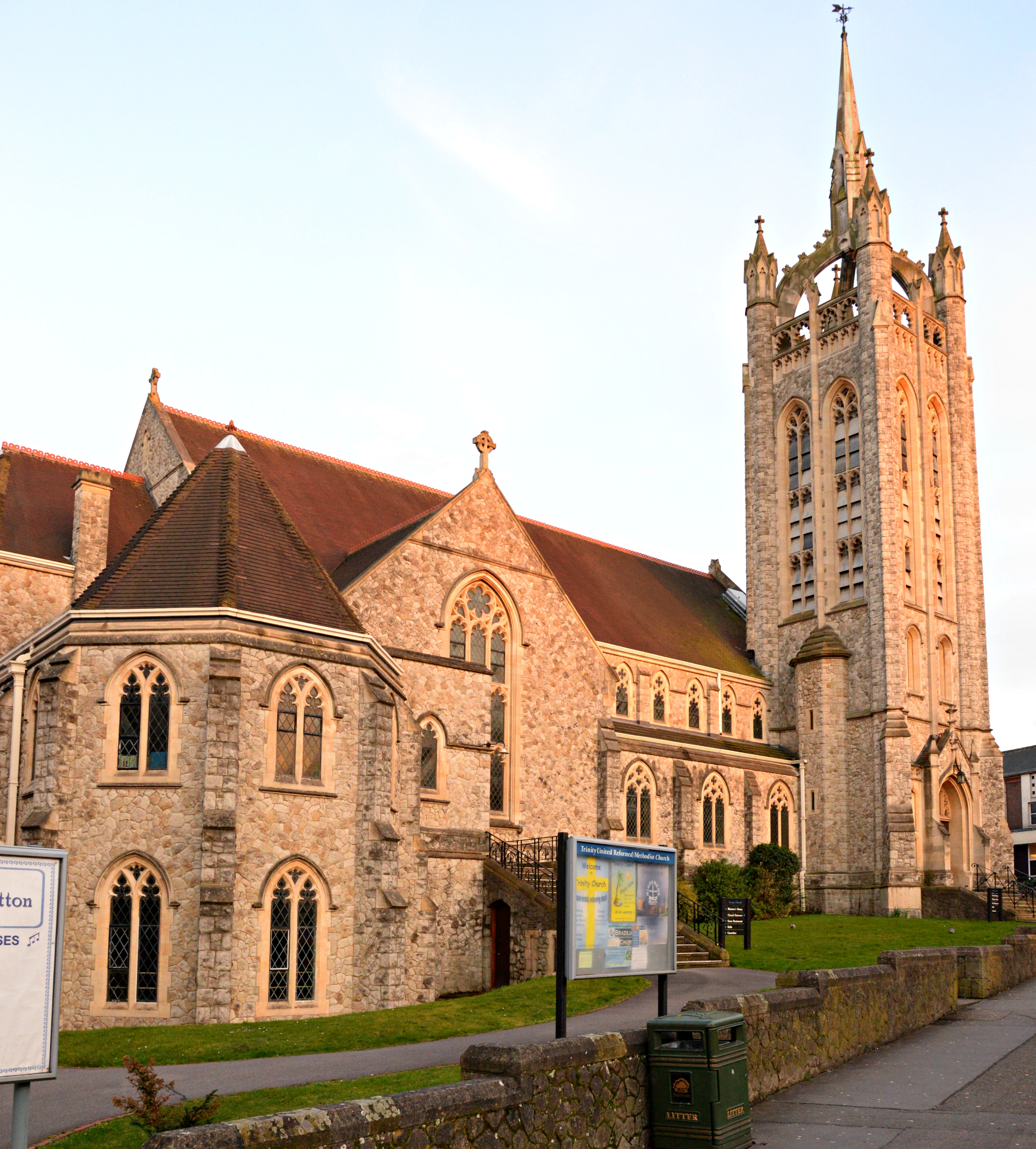
Trinity Church

The Grade II listed Trinity Church is in the Gothic Revival style, with its exterior in Kent ragstone. Its tall, square tower is the most striking architectural feature and makes the building a landmark. Its "crown and lantern" spire is a very unusual feature, shared with two cathedrals — St Giles' Cathedral in Edinburgh and Newcastle Cathedral.

The present building, officially opened in 1907, was renamed Trinity Methodist Church following the Methodist Union in 1932. In 1972 the Congregational and Presbyterian Churches united, and the Congregational and Methodist congregations in Sutton also united, with Trinity becoming a joint United Reformed and Methodist church.

=== Sutton Baptist Church ===
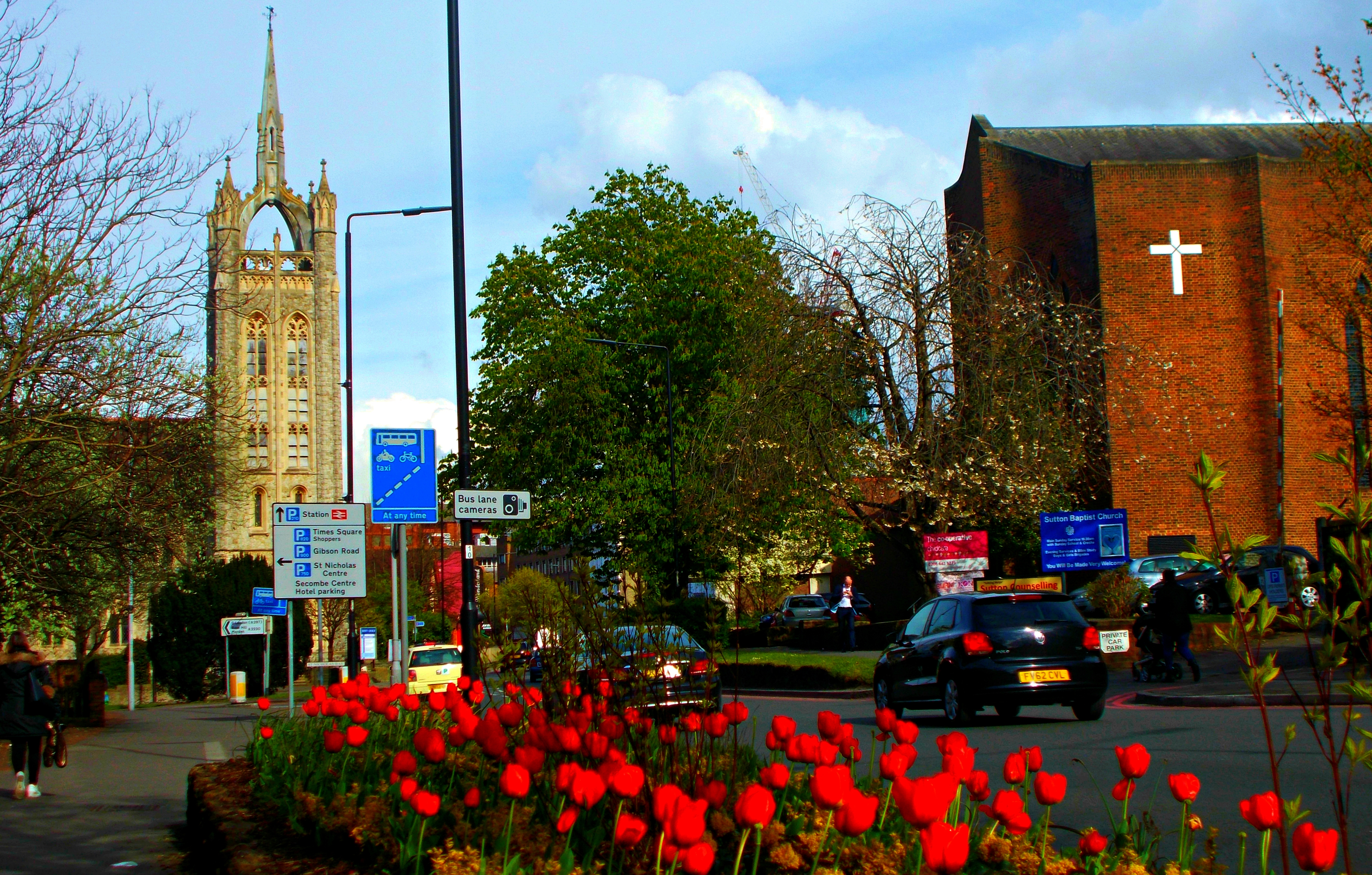
Trinity Church (left) and Sutton Baptist Church (right), Cheam Road

In contrast to the other two town centre churches, the Baptist Church is relatively modern—it was designed by the architect Nugent Cachemaille-Day (1896–1976) using mainly traditional materials, such as brick and tile, in a style influenced by the Arts and Crafts Movement. Built by Messrs. Pitchers Ltd of Holloway in 1934, the church took little more than half-a-year to build, and its design aroused interest not only locally, but also in church and architectural circles nationwide.

The church is noted within the borough for its contemporary brick design with long walls and concave sweeps in the moderne style. The windows are in simple clean lines, in a simplified Gothic style. The interior has much exposed brickwork and sweeping pointed arches, which are highlighted by the directions in which the bricks are laid.

=== St Nicholas Church ===
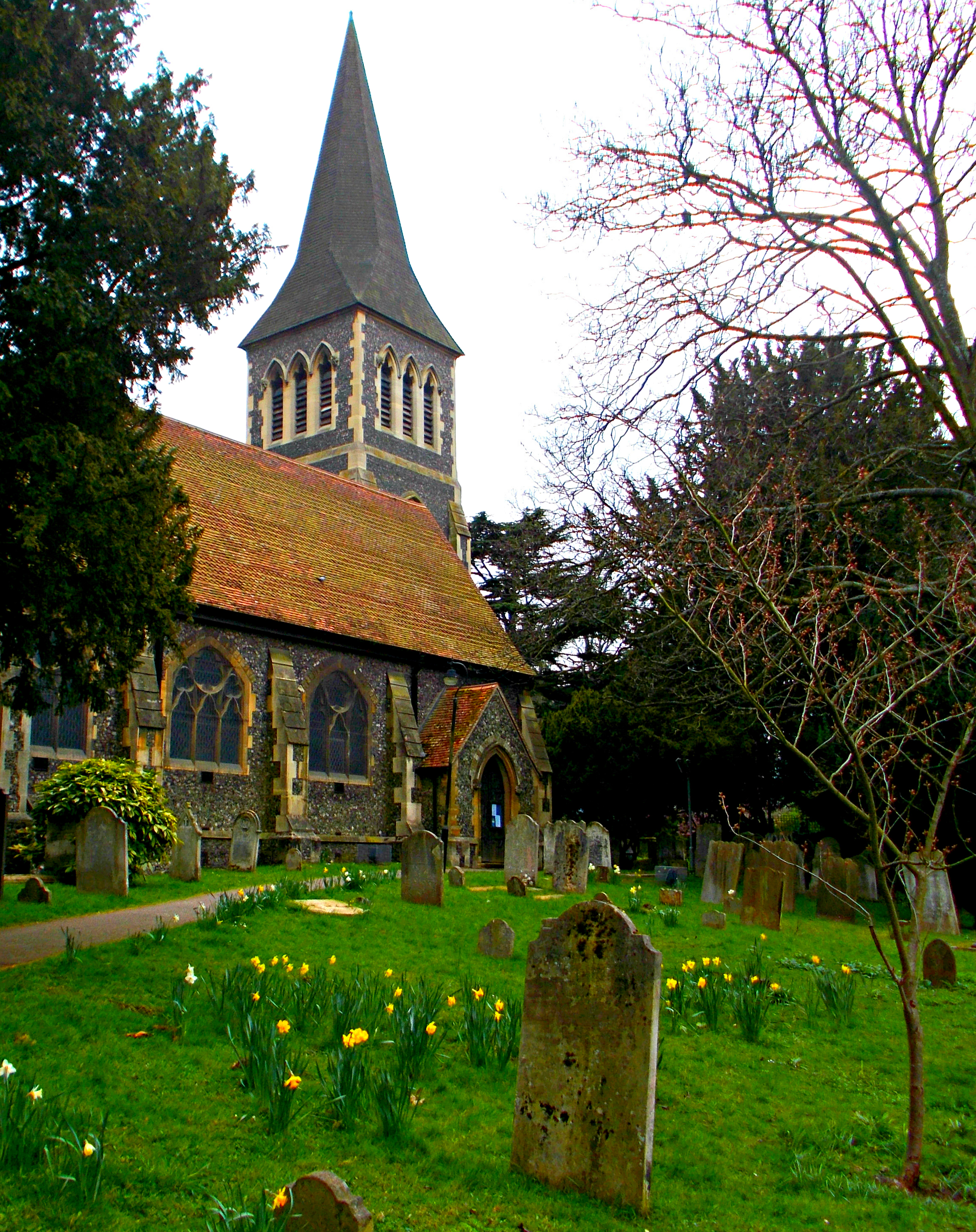
St Nicholas churchyard

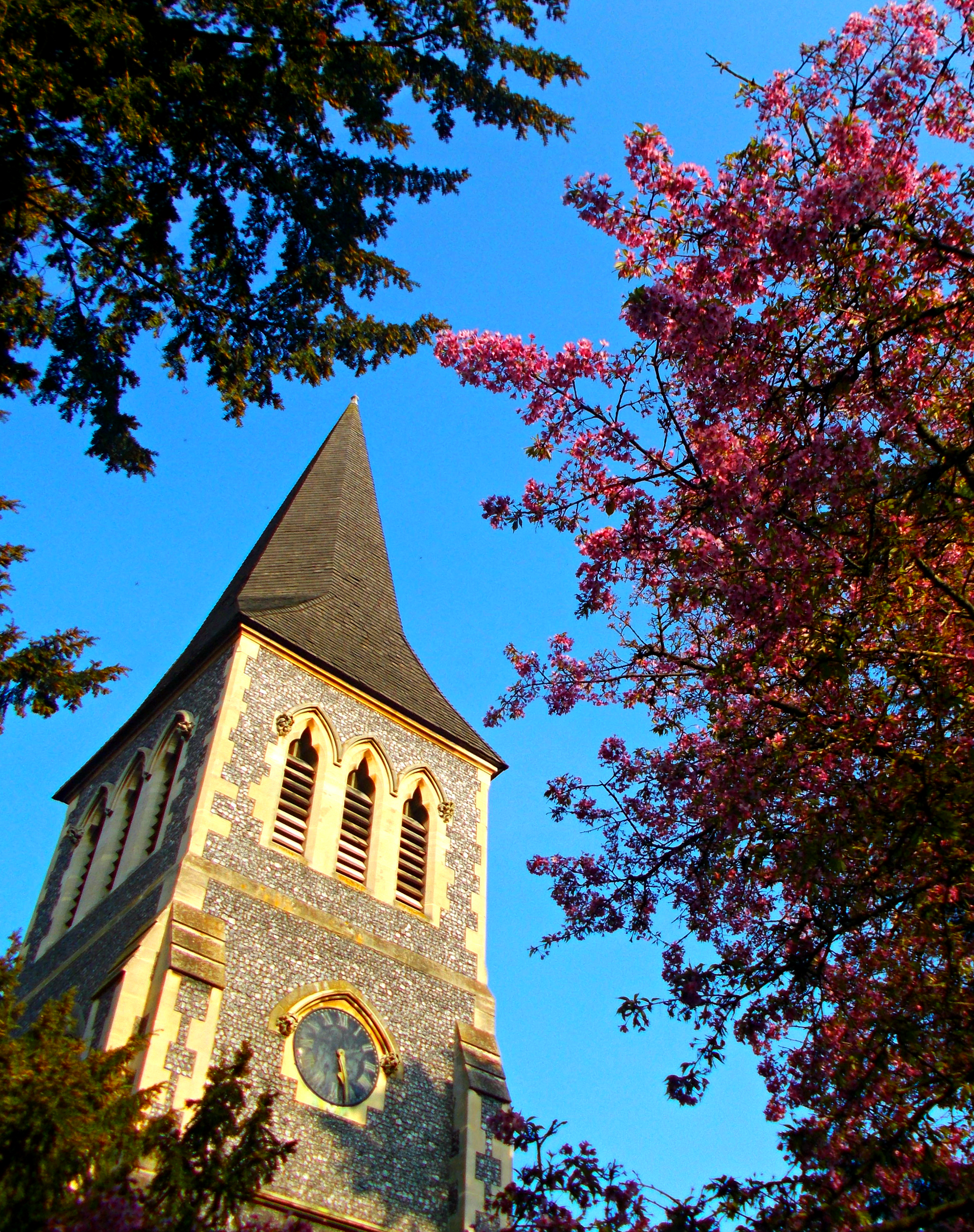
St Nicholas clocktower

The Grade II listed St Nicholas Church is the oldest of the three town centre churches, and is surrounded by a small ancient graveyard, which is wooded. It is in ecumenical partnership with other denominations and in a Team Ministry with other Anglican churches.

Many of Sutton's notable historic residents are buried in the churchyard. These include Mr Horward Orme, the final owner of the manor house; Dorothy Mason, wife of Sir William Brownlow, 4th Baronet; William Talbot, 1st Earl Talbot; and 185 orphans from the Metropolitan District School. The orphans' graves are marked by a memorial put up by the church's Sunday school children in 1921. A large World War II bomb landed on the churchyard in 1940. It destroyed several graves, but the church building itself remained intact.

=== All Saints Church ===
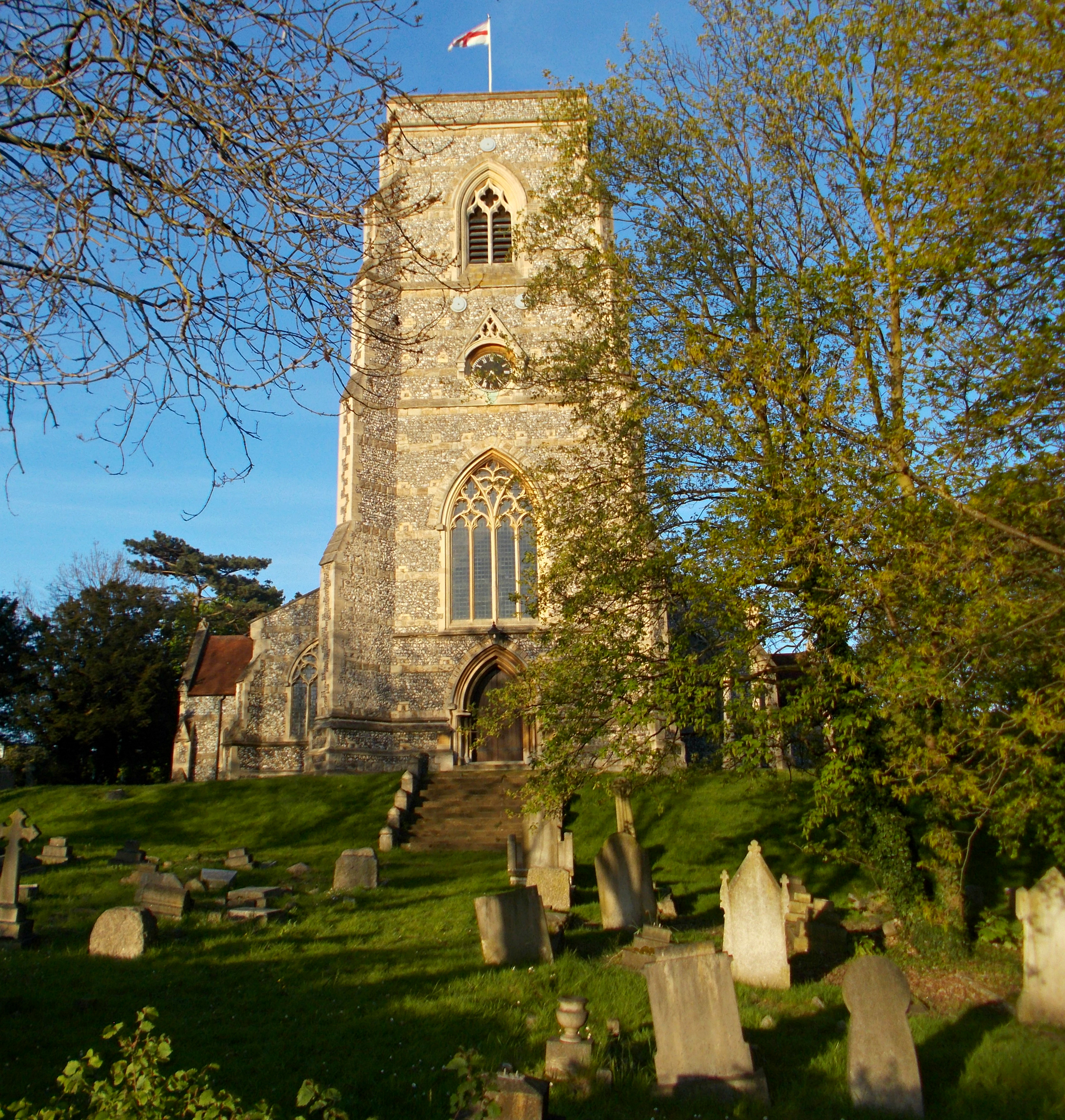
All Saints Church

Just to the north of Sutton town centre at the foot of Angel Hill in All Saints Road is All Saints Church, Benhilton. Its large size and prominent location make it a local landmark. Its parish was created in 1863, and the foundation stone of the Grade II* listed building was laid in the same year, designed by Samuel Sanders Teulon in the Gothic Revival style. The then lord of the manor, Thomas Alcock, gave £18,000 towards the building, plus the land for the church, the vicarage and a school. The church was conceived as an amenity for an estate of upper class Victorian housing which Alcock was developing on the land to the east.

There is a historic churchyard around the church, which includes several significant tombs. It is wooded, including yew trees beside the path to the north porch.

English Heritage describe the church as "a very fine building in the decorated style of the early 14th century".

=== St. Barnabas Church ===
To the east of the town centre is St Barnabas Church, which was built between 1882 and 1884 by architects R H Carpenter and Benjamin Ingelow. Its purpose was to serve the Newtown area of Sutton, which was developed in the second half of the 19th century.

Architecturally, the church is a red brick building with stone dressings, and is in the Gothic Revival style. Its nave has five bays, and is supported inside by columns with clustered shafts and a timber scissors truss roof.

=== Christ Church ===
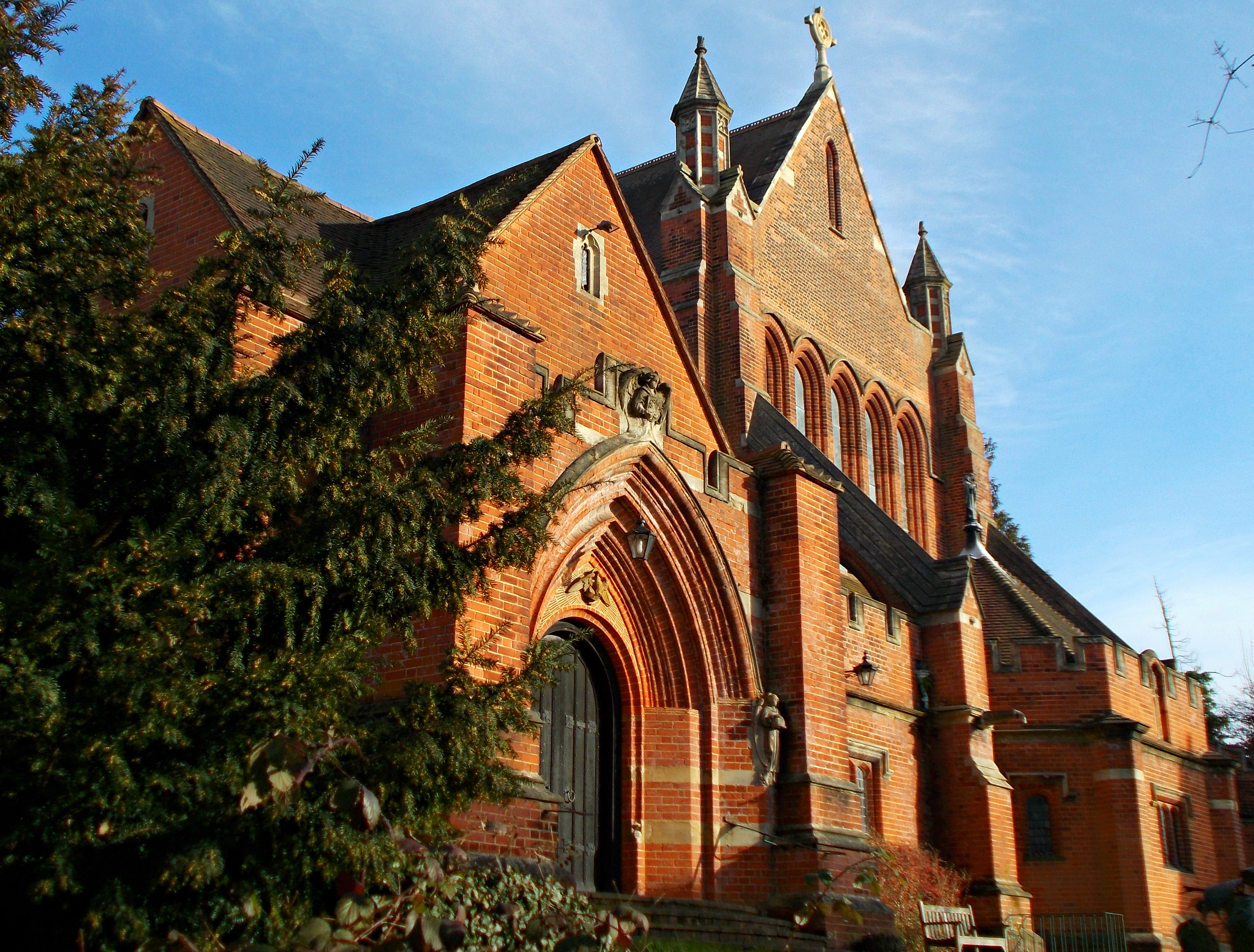
Christ Church from the road

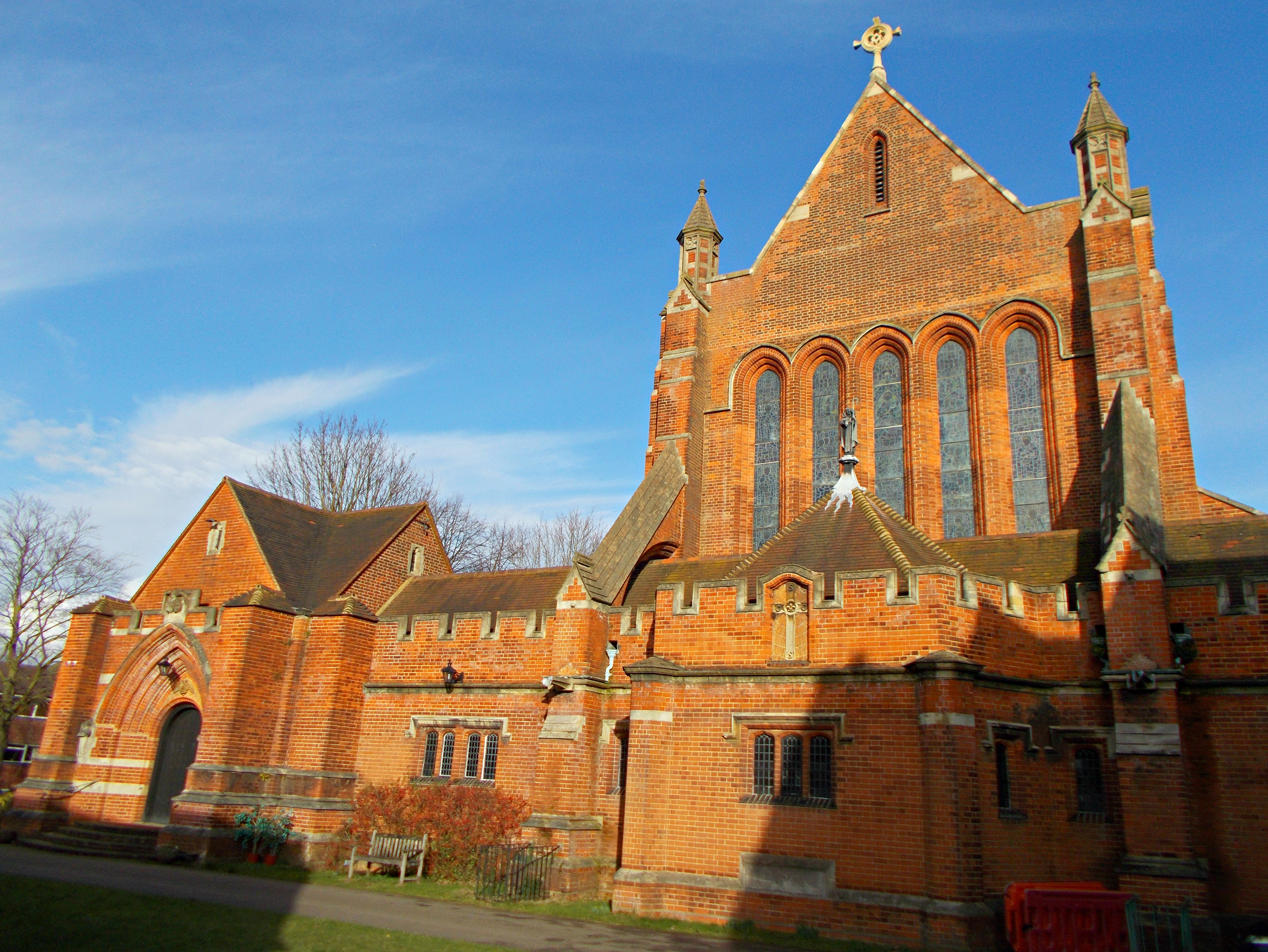
Christ Church from the grounds

To the south of the town centre in Christchurch Park sits Christ Church, Sutton. It was built in 1888 by architects Newman & Jacques. Additions were made c. 1910 to 1912 by J D Round.

The church was built as part of the 19th century expansion of the town. With the growing population to the south of the parish church of St Nicholas in the town centre, the need was recognised for the people living in the south to have a more local church. The building was sited among the then lavender fields east of Brighton Road. The church has the largest auditorium in Sutton, and comprises a nave of five bays, a chancel, apse, north and south aisles, chapel, narthex and vestries.

=== Church of Our Lady of the Rosary and Church of the Holy Family ===
To the east of the town centre, on St Barnabas Road, is the Church of Our Lady of the Rosary. It was built and consecrated in 1892, before it was enlarged in 1912; in 1932 the church's current altar was consecrated by the then Roman Catholic Bishop of Southwark, Peter Amigo.

The Church of the Holy Family, though closer to the town centre, is more recent, starting as Holy Family Church Hall in the 1960s. The current church was built in 1988, two years after being given its own parish.

== Culture ==
Sutton has a range of public art, a large library, a music venue and a cinema and theatre. It is a hub for filming in south-west London.

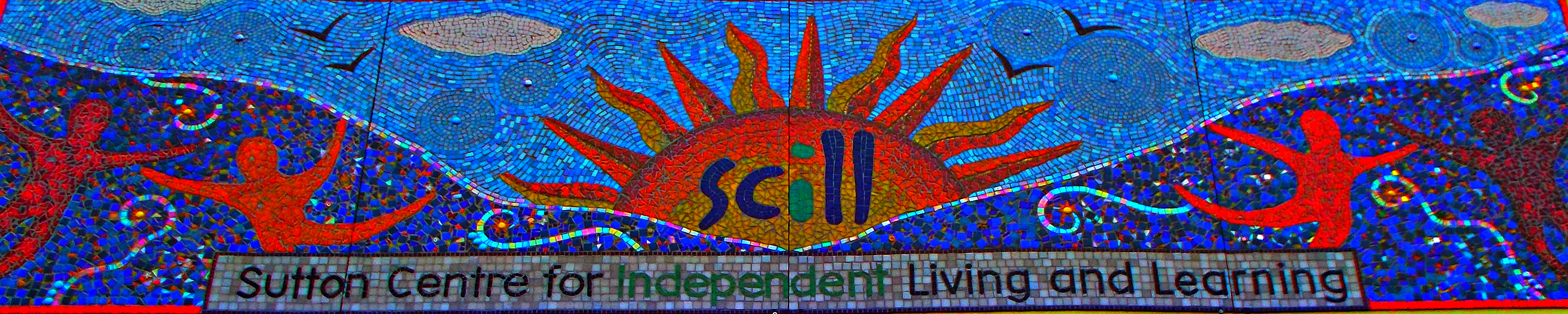
Mosaic on the side of the Sutton Centre for Independent Living and Learning (Swipe to view full image in mobile view.)

=== Sutton Central Library's Art Gallery Space ===
Sutton Central Library's Art Gallery aims to provide the London Borough of Sutton's residents with a wide range of contemporary art, heritage and history experiences. The gallery space is available for hire to professional artists, collectives and non-profit groups wishing to exhibit their work individually or as a group. Entrance to the gallery and access to the exhibition is free for all members of the public, except for specific events.

=== Imagine festival of arts ===
In 2006 the annual Imagine festival of arts was launched. It has since gained Arts Council England funding.

=== Public art ===
Sutton town centre contains six main works of public art, as well as several other works. Of the main works, three are murals and three are sculptures.

==== Sutton heritage mosaic ====
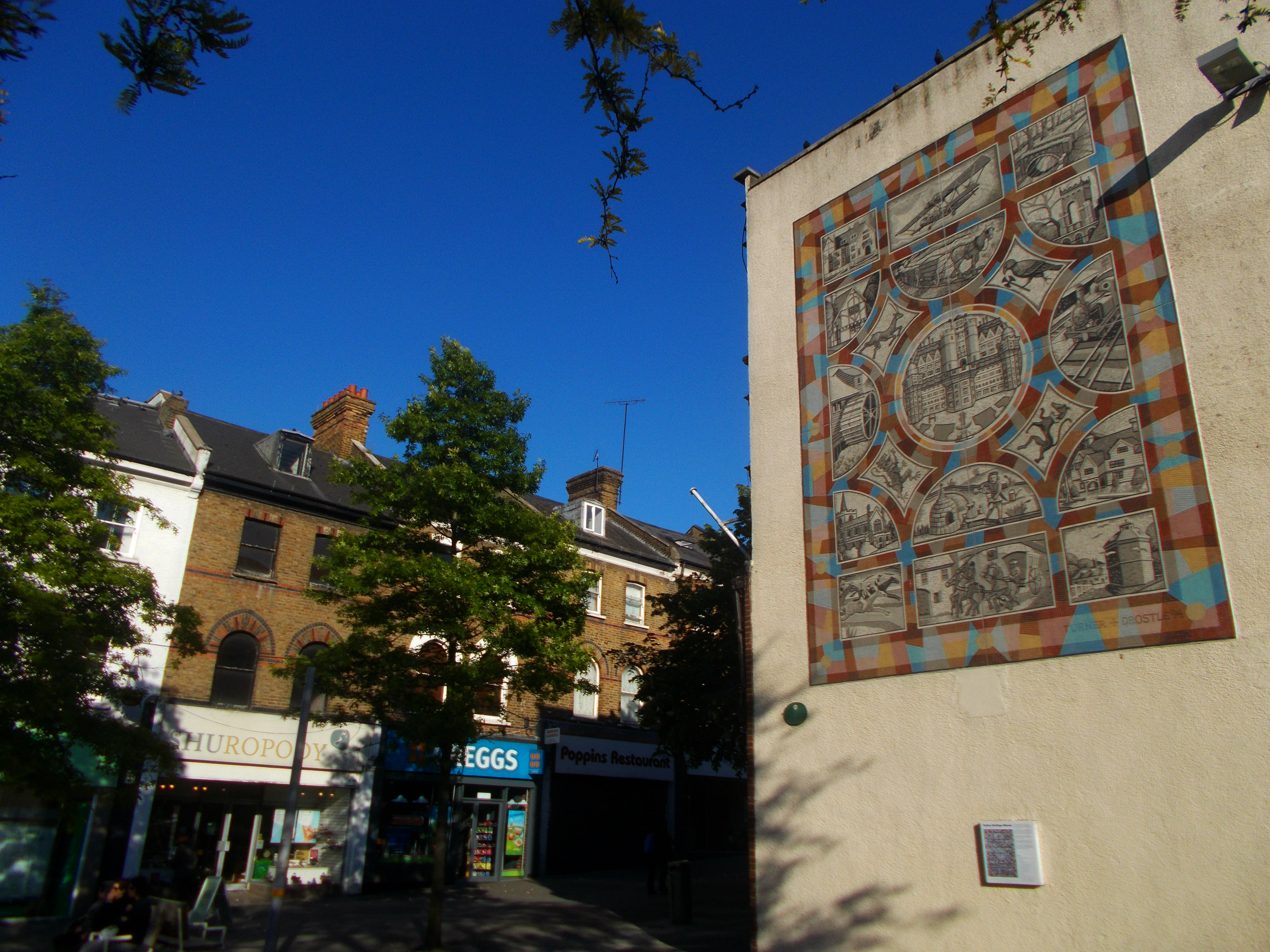
The Sutton Heritage Mosaic

There is a large town centre mosaic measuring 9 metres (30 ft) high and 5 metres (16 ft) wide covering the whole of a three-storey wall in the town square near the Waterstone's bookshop. One of the largest examples of wall art in Britain, it was commissioned by the London Borough of Sutton to celebrate the borough's heritage. Created by artists Gary Drostle and Rob Turner, the mosaic was made from vitreous ceramic tesserae (small tiles made of glass and clay), and put in place in 1994.

It was designed by Rob Turner, and shows several aspects of Sutton's heritage and local history. The centre-piece is the depiction of Henry VIII's palace at Nonsuch.

A plaque describing the panels was installed in 2011, and unveiled by Councillor Graham Tope, who said:

This beautiful mosaic has been a much-loved feature of our High Street for the past 17 years.....I hope this plaque will help [people] to appreciate it even more."

==== Wellesley Road mural ====
Mural depicting Erykah Badu in Wellesley Road, Sutton

There is a large mural in Wellesley Road, about a hundred yards south of the railway station. It was created by the street artist, Eva Mena, who is from Bilbao, Spain and a leading practitioner in the urban art movement. The mural dates from 2008, and was completed in three days.

It was commissioned by the owner of a cleaning firm keen to promote local art, and depicts an image of Erykah Badu, the American singer-songwriter. The painting covers the entire side wall of Indepth House, a small office building occupied by the firm.

==== Sutton twin towns mural ====
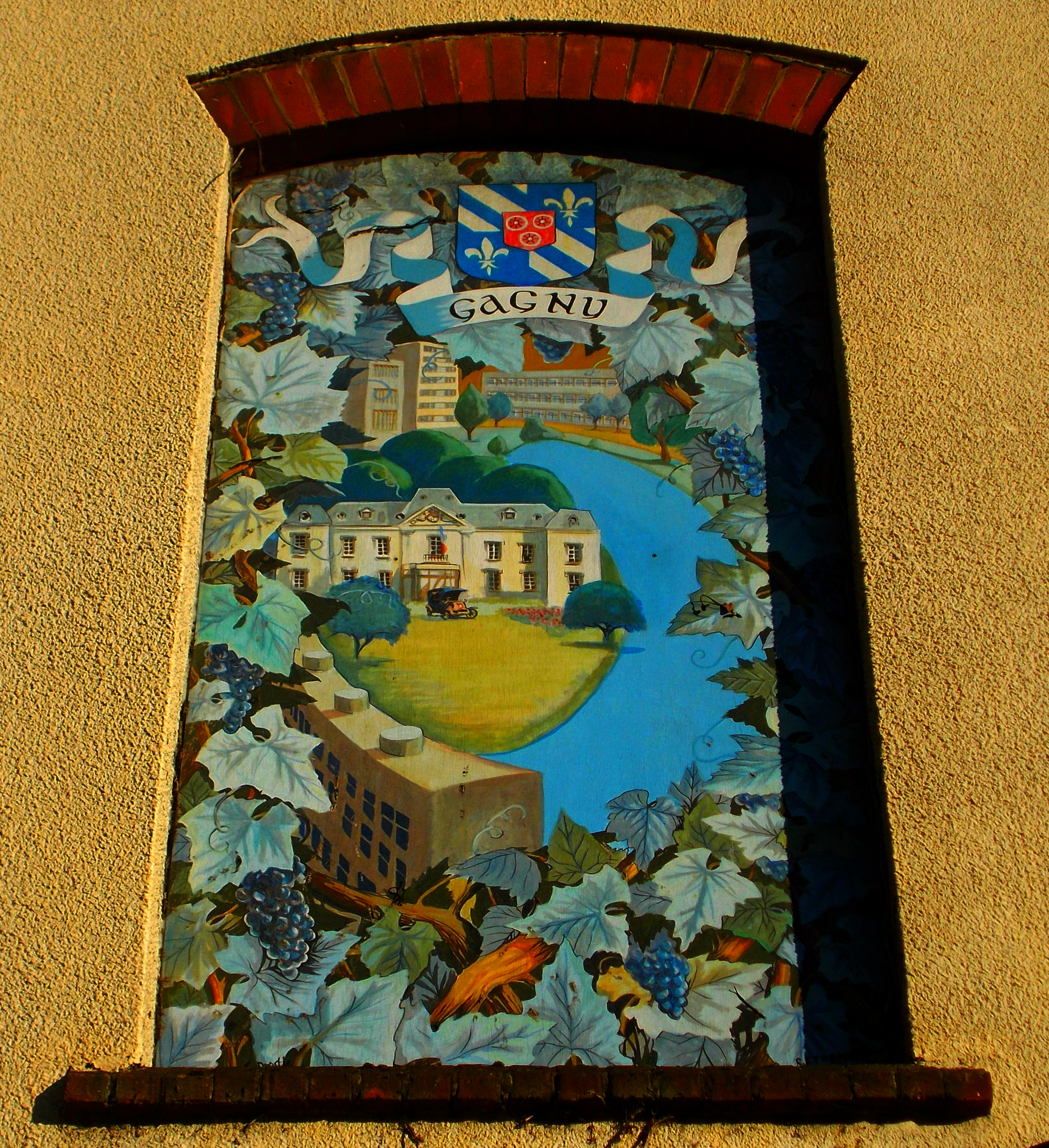
The painting of Gagny

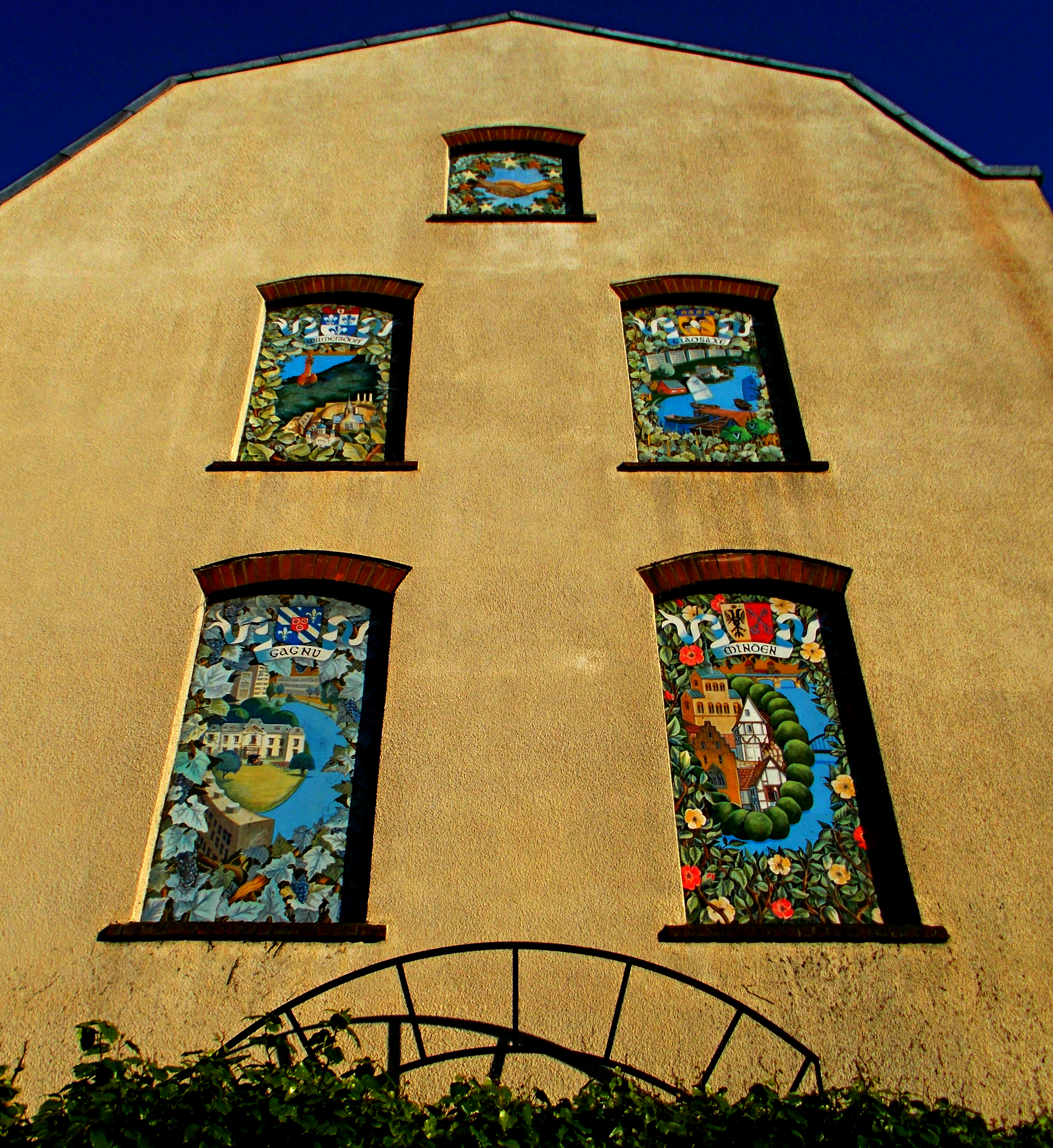
Sutton twin towns mural

The twin towns mural is a set of seven individual paintings inset within seven mock window frames on the side of a Victorian commercial building at the junction of the High Street with Sutton Court Road. The paintings depict scenes of the London Borough of Sutton and its four European twins: Gagny, a suburb of Paris; Gladsaxe in Copenhagen; Minden in Germany; and Charlottenburg-Wilmersdorf in Berlin.

The paintings were designed and painted on to plywood by public artists, Gary Drostle and Rob Turner and were unveiled in 1993 on the 25th anniversary of Sutton's twinning with Wilmersdorf. The five twins are each painted with their heraldic shield above images of their key features. Each twin also has its own plant to symbolise environmental awareness; for Sutton this is a beech tree, from which Carshalton Beeches in the borough gets its name.

==== Sutton armillary ====
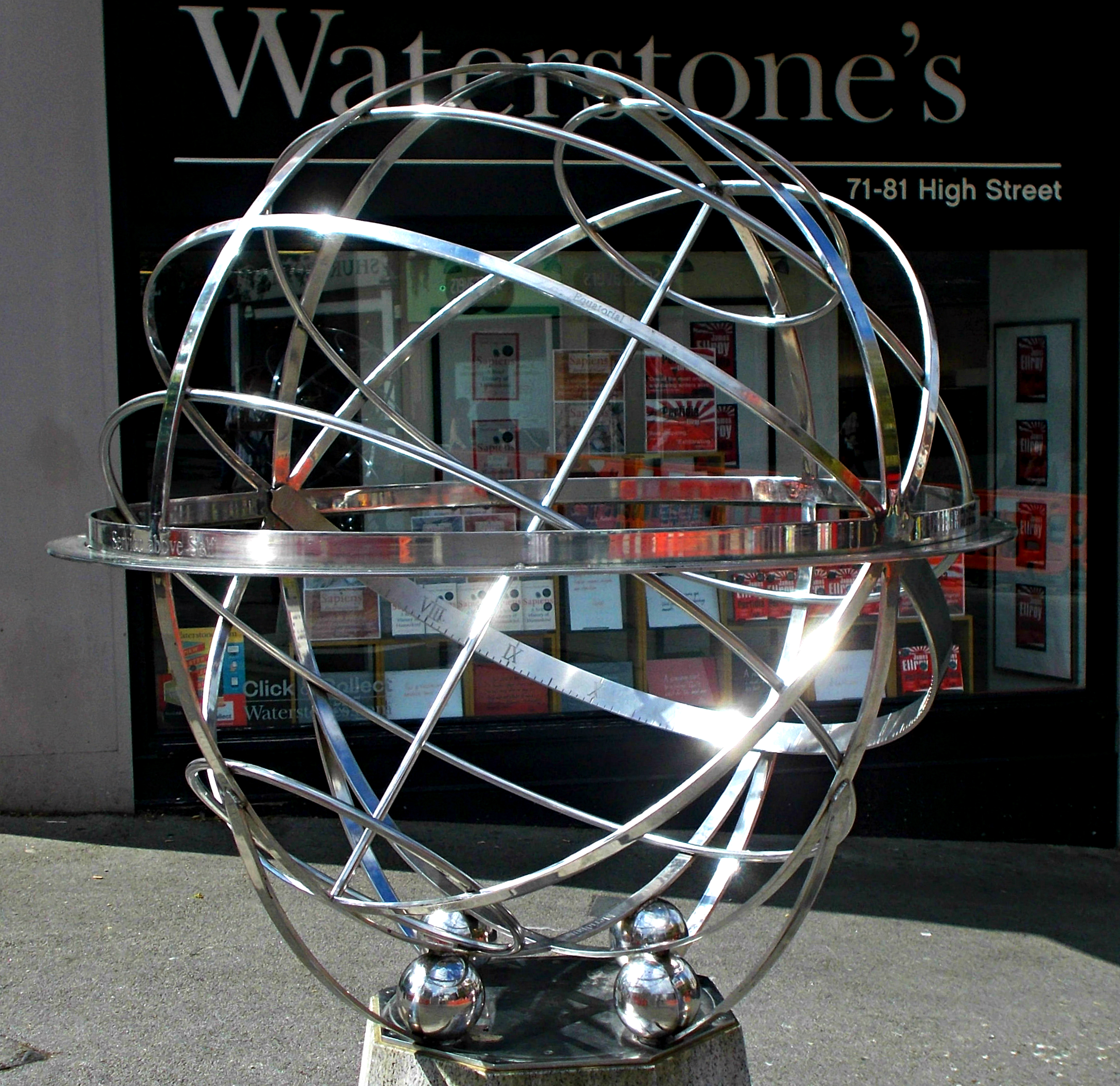
The Sutton armillary

The Millennium Dial armillary was dedicated to the town in the year 2000 by the Rotary Club. It is in the form of an historical timepiece, and it serves three purposes: first, to tell the time; secondly, to commemorate time through various inscriptions including the Rotary motto "Service Above Self" and distances to nearby areas such as Kingston upon Thames; and thirdly, to commemorate the work which the Rotary Club has done.

The armillary is a popular feature of the town, and it continues to provide a focus for the town centre. It marks not just the new millennium but also the central part that the Rotary has played in the welfare of Sutton since 1923.

It was originally installed in the former "Millennium Garden", but was slightly re-positioned in 2011 to the edge of the central square, in front of the Waterstones bookshop.

==== The Messenger ====
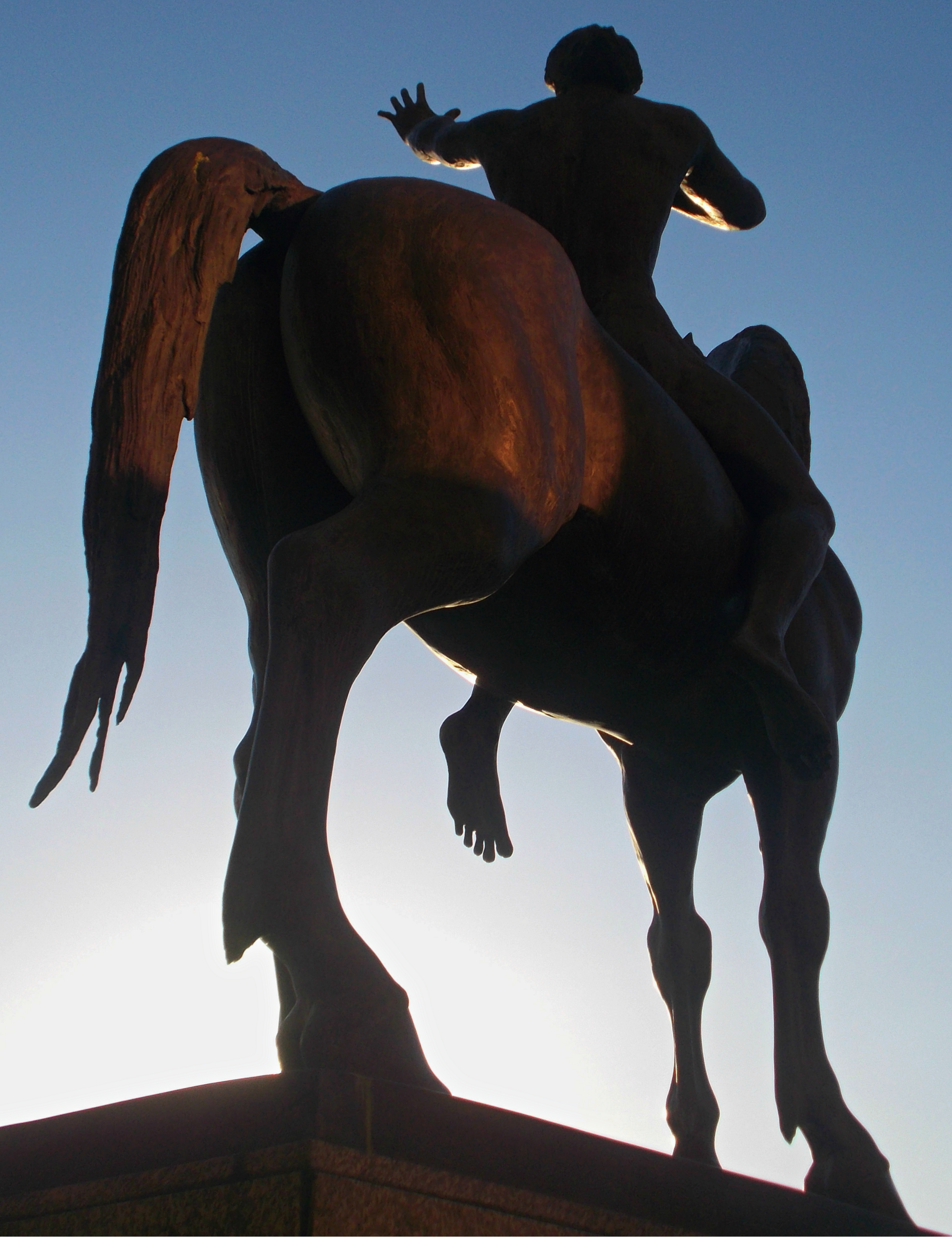
The Messenger

The Messenger statue is a sculpture in bronze with very dark patination completed by David Wynne, OBE in 1981 of a large horse and rider. The horse, with a slightly raised left leg, looks towards the railway station. The rider, seated bareback, raises his left hand in the air above his head and his right hand to his mouth, as if calling. It is fully life-size and mounted on a 7-foot plinth of marble and granite slabs. The total height is 150 inches (3.8 m).

The statue was commissioned by the then Business Press International Ltd, and upkeep of the work then fell to Reed Business Information, who occupied Quadrant House at the time. It was a major commission for the sculptor, which took four years from his first idea and inspiration, through to roughing out, refining and foundry to the final unveiling and installation. The company wanted him to illustrate its fundamental business, communication, but to convey the idea of it, rather than simply represent it in a completely obvious way. The statue is located by the main entrance to Quadrant House, adjacent to Sutton station.

==== Transpose 2002 ====
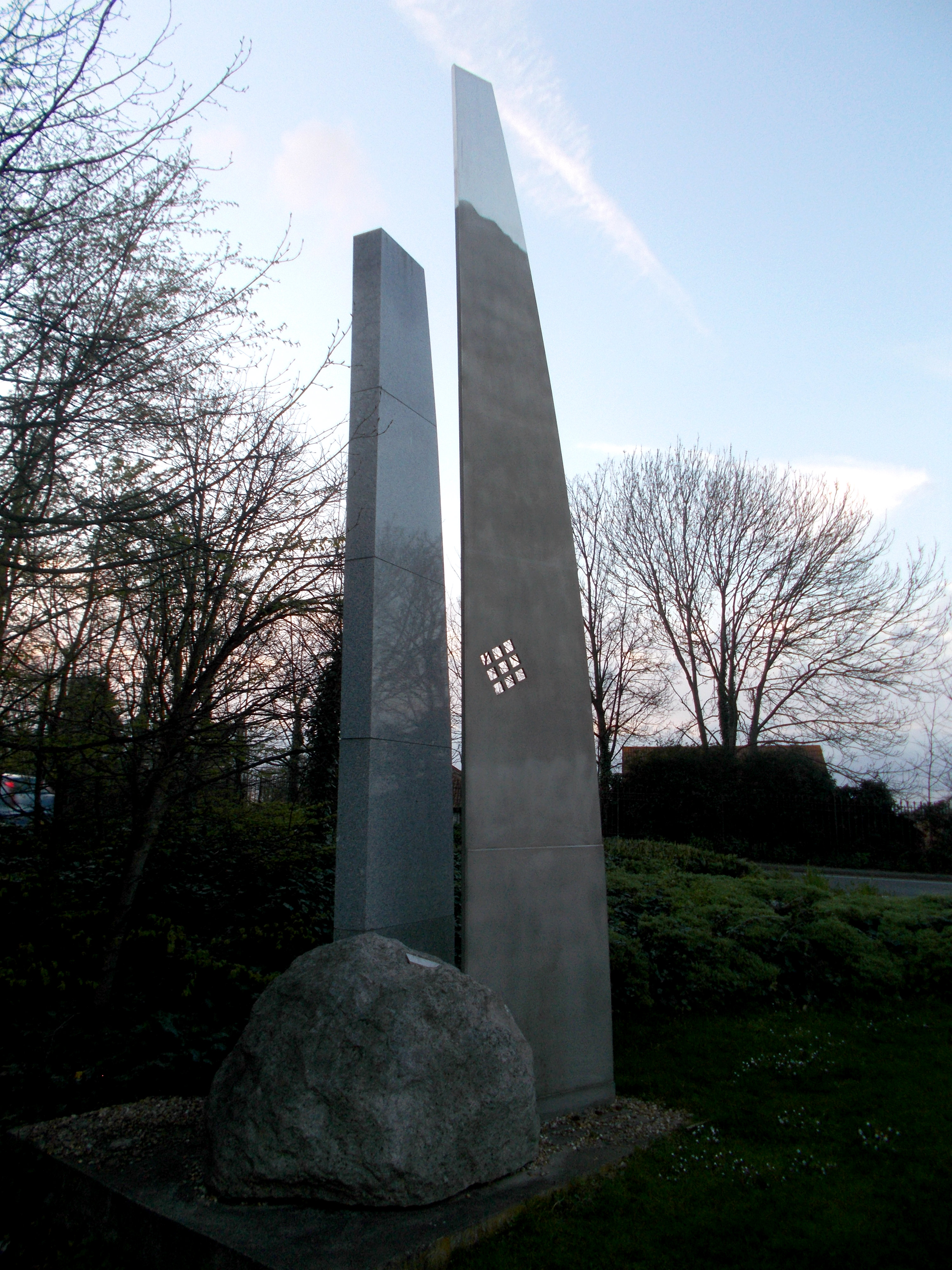
Transpose 2002

Transpose 2002 is a sculpture by Michael Dan Archer, located at the junction of Carshalton Road and Langley Park Road, about 250 yards from the town's historic central crossroads. It is 7 metres (23 feet) in height, 1.5 metres (5 feet) in width and 1.5 metres in depth, and made of Chinese granite and stainless steel. It is composed of a steel blade-like structure next to a granite form. The blade contains a grid allowing the sun to shine through on to the granite.

The sculpture was commissioned jointly by Chartwell Land, B&Q and the London Borough of Sutton. As its name suggests, it dates from 2002. Archer says his sculptures "primarily invoke the massiveness and physicality of stone and its relationship to architecture, humanity and landscape".

The design, location and dimensions of Transpose 2002 all combine to make it a significant landmark for those entering Sutton town centre from an easterly direction along Carshalton Road.

=== Rainbow crossing ===
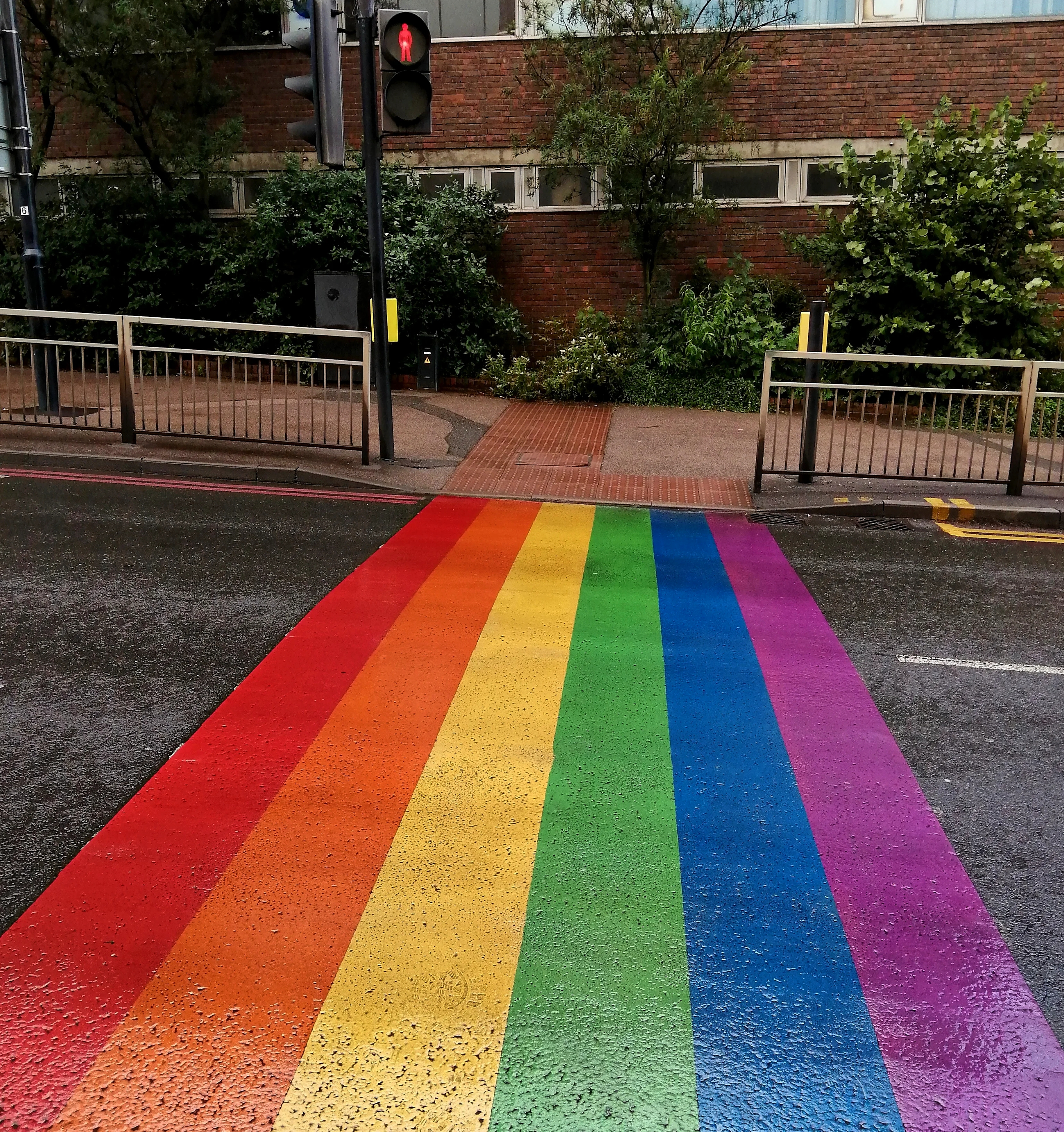
The Rainbow crossing in Sutton

In mid-2020, a permanent rainbow pedestrian crossing in honour of the borough's LGBT+ community was installed in St. Nicholas Way, adjacent to the Sutton Civic Centre, a prominent location in Sutton town centre. This makes Sutton one of fewer than ten London boroughs to have permanent LGBT+ rainbow crossings. Tyrone Ashby, Sutton LGBTQ+ Forum Chair, said:

"Having a rainbow crossing will show visitors to Sutton that we are signalling an inclusive environment for LGBTQ+ communities – we are showing our true colours as an open, diverse and accepting borough and we have Pride in our hearts."

=== Transgender crossing ===
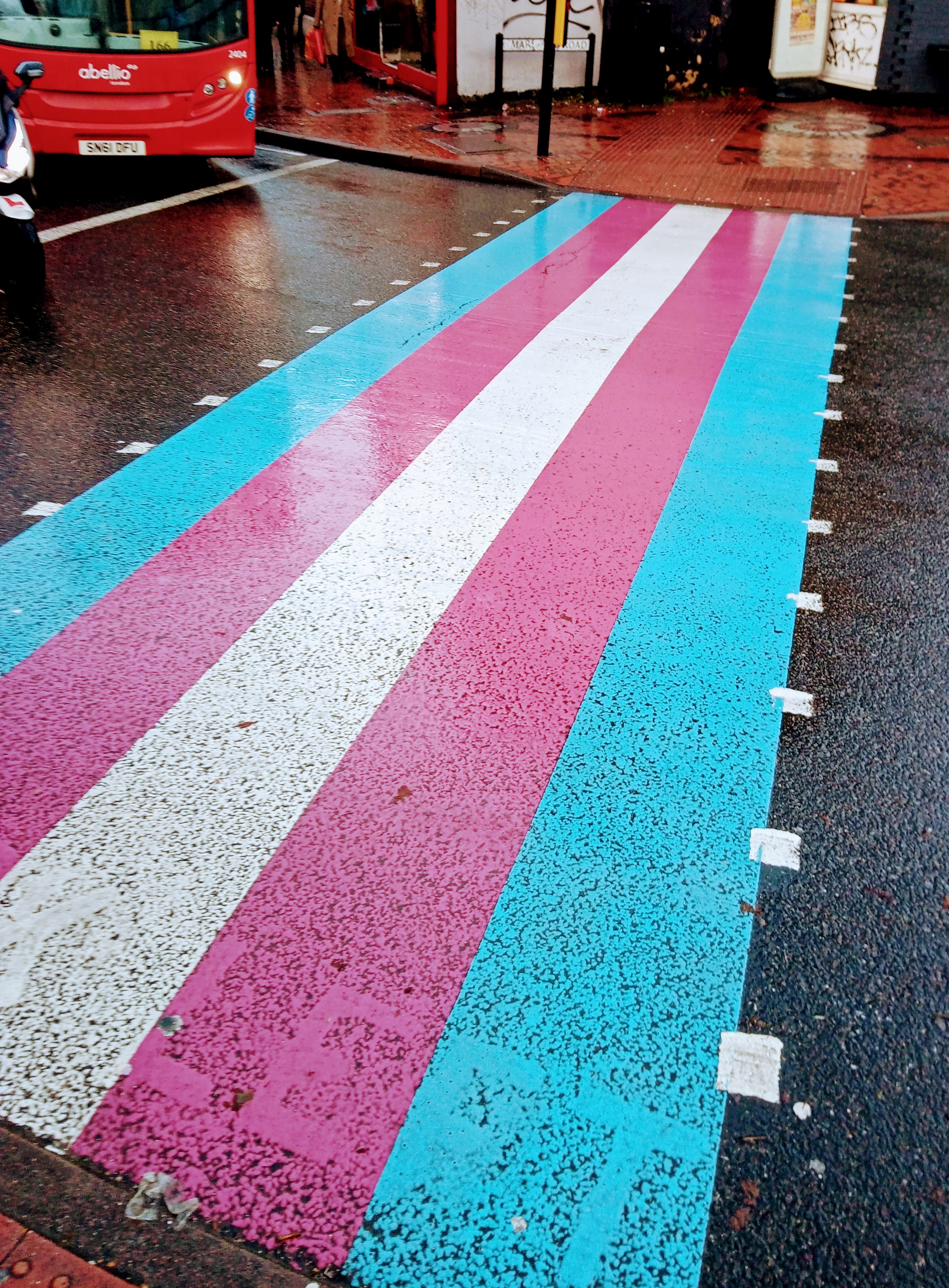
The transgender flag crossing in Sutton

In May 2021 the country's first transgender pedestrian crossing was painted in Sutton town centre, near the north end of Sutton High Street. Its installation was timed to coincide with International Day Against Homophobia, Transphobia and Biphobia.

Cllr Jake Short, Sutton Council's Lead Member for Equalities, said: "I am delighted to see this celebration of the richness and diversity that our transgender community brings to Sutton. Until transgender people and other minority groups are able to live without fear of discrimination or hate, we must continue to demonstrate our support and stand with them to clearly demonstrate our commitment to eliminating transphobia."

=== Diversity mural ===
Sutton Council is planning to create a large mural in the town centre celebrating diversity in the borough. Using local artists, it will be installed on the wall of Sutton College on St Nicholas Way. Completion was expected in the summer of 2021.

=== Commemorative bench ===
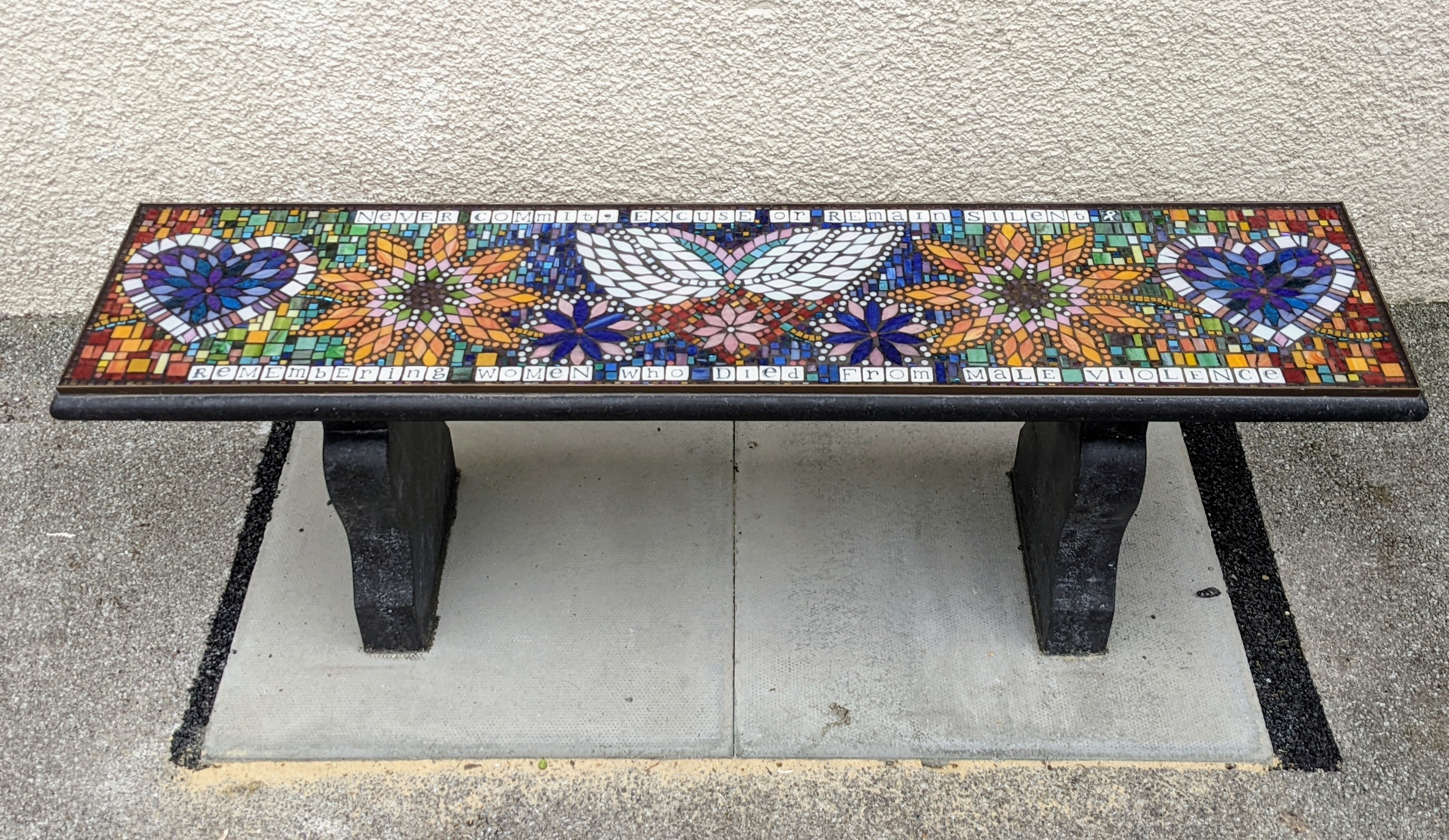
The commemorative bench in Trinity Square, Sutton

A bench dedicated to female victims of male violence was unveiled in Trinity Square in Sutton town centre in March 2022, created by local artists Samia Tossio and Hana Horack, following the murders in 2021 of Sarah Everard and Sabina Nessa. Having a brightly coloured mosaic surface themed with hearts and stars, the inscription reads, "Never commit, excuse or remain silent" (words used by the White Ribbon Campaign) and "Remembering women who died from male violence". Plans for the bench were conceived by the Reclaim Sutton's Streets campaign group, following a vigil for Sabina Nessa in the same location in 2021 held around a "tree of remembrance" decorated with yarn-bombing.

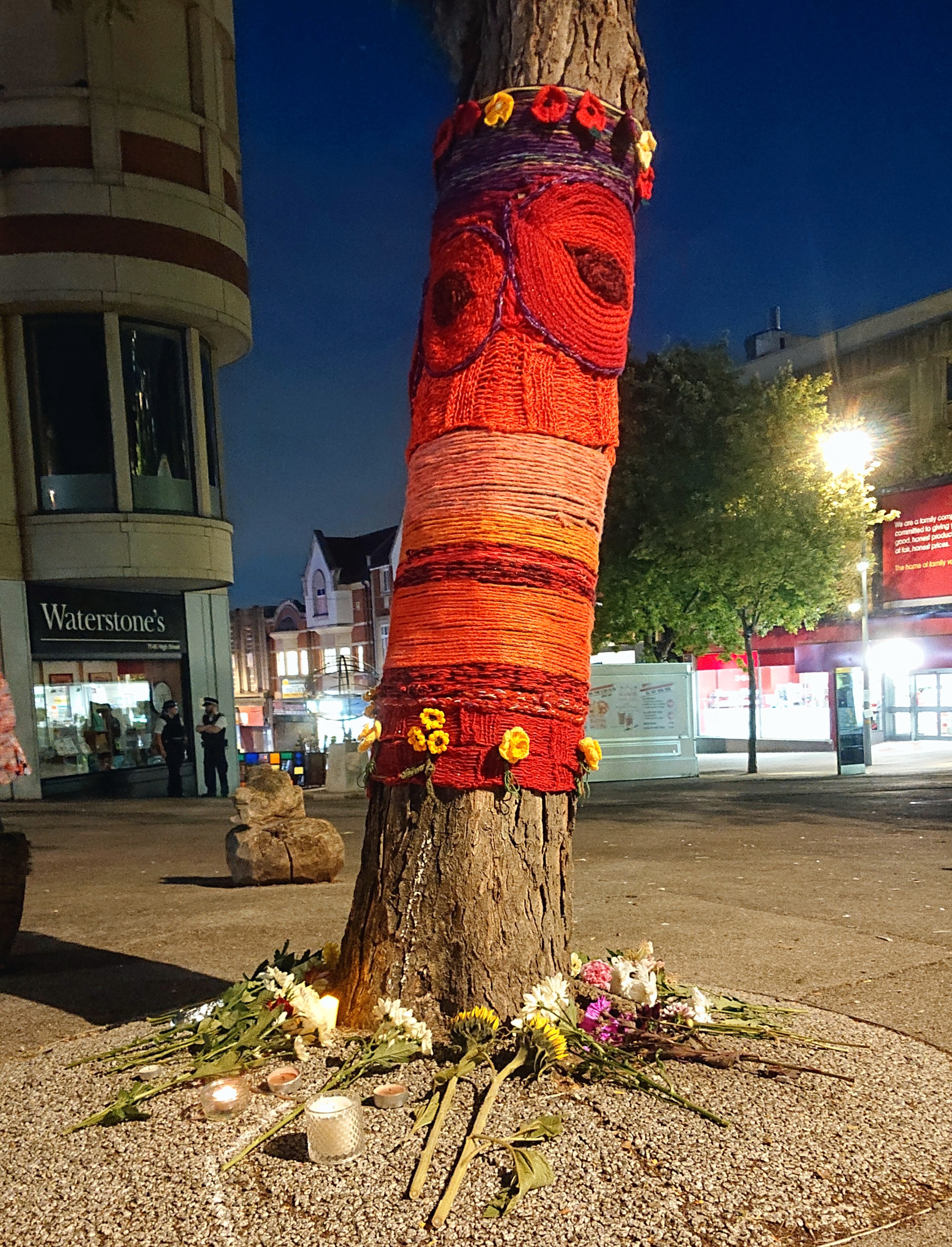
"Tree of remembrance" decorated with yarn-bombing near the bench

Sutton mayor, Trish Fivey, said at the unveiling: "Today, we're here to unveil this very moving tribute to all women and girls who have died as a result of male violence, no matter who they were or where they lived." Also present was Sarah McGuinness, chair of Reclaim Sutton's Streets, who said: "Campaigning to end violence against women and girls ... can be met with resistance ... but the movement grows ... as day after day women are abused and killed. Having such a beautiful mosaic memorial not only shines light on all the women who have been lost to male violence, it also educates and calls to action ..."

=== Literary facilities ===
Sutton Library is situated close to the top of the town, near St Nicholas Church, and is part of a complex which contains the Civic Offices and Sutton College. It is the largest library in the borough. Opened in 1975, it was extensively refurbished in 2004 to meet changing customer needs. It was the first public library to appoint a library writer-in-residence; the first to establish a CD and video lending library; and the first to offer a full public library service on Sundays. The library is arranged over four storeys, and the lending and reference facilities extend to a reader's lounge; café and shop; IT facilities; opportunities to listen to music; and a children's library themed around the world's environments.

Art exhibitions are held in the library's Europa Gallery.

=== Sutton Life Centre ===
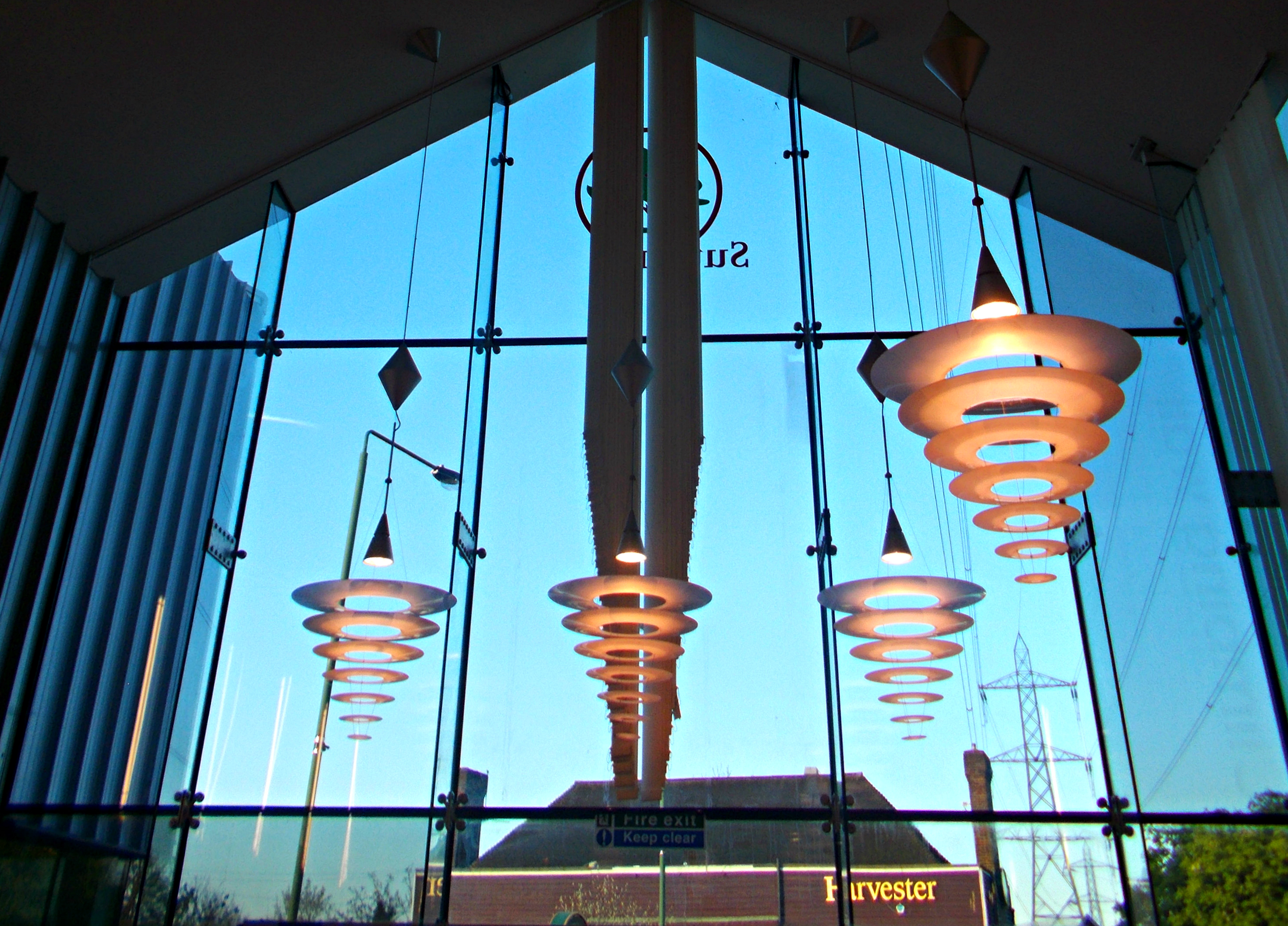
Sutton Life Centre

The Sutton Life Centre situated in Alcorn Close, just off Sutton Common Road, is an £8 million facility designed to improve life chances for younger people and encourage good citizenship. Aiming to encourage community engagement and involvement, the centre was opened on 27 October 2010 by the then Deputy Prime Minister Nick Clegg.

The centre's key feature – The Lifezone – is a virtual street, a room with giant projection screens on all walls using film-set technology. It aims to provide an "immersive learning environment" through the use of surround sound, evocative lighting and interactive features. Using these media, pupils are shown real-life scenes from Sutton's streets to teach them about citizenship, personal safety and the environment.

=== Theatre and cinema ===
Theatre

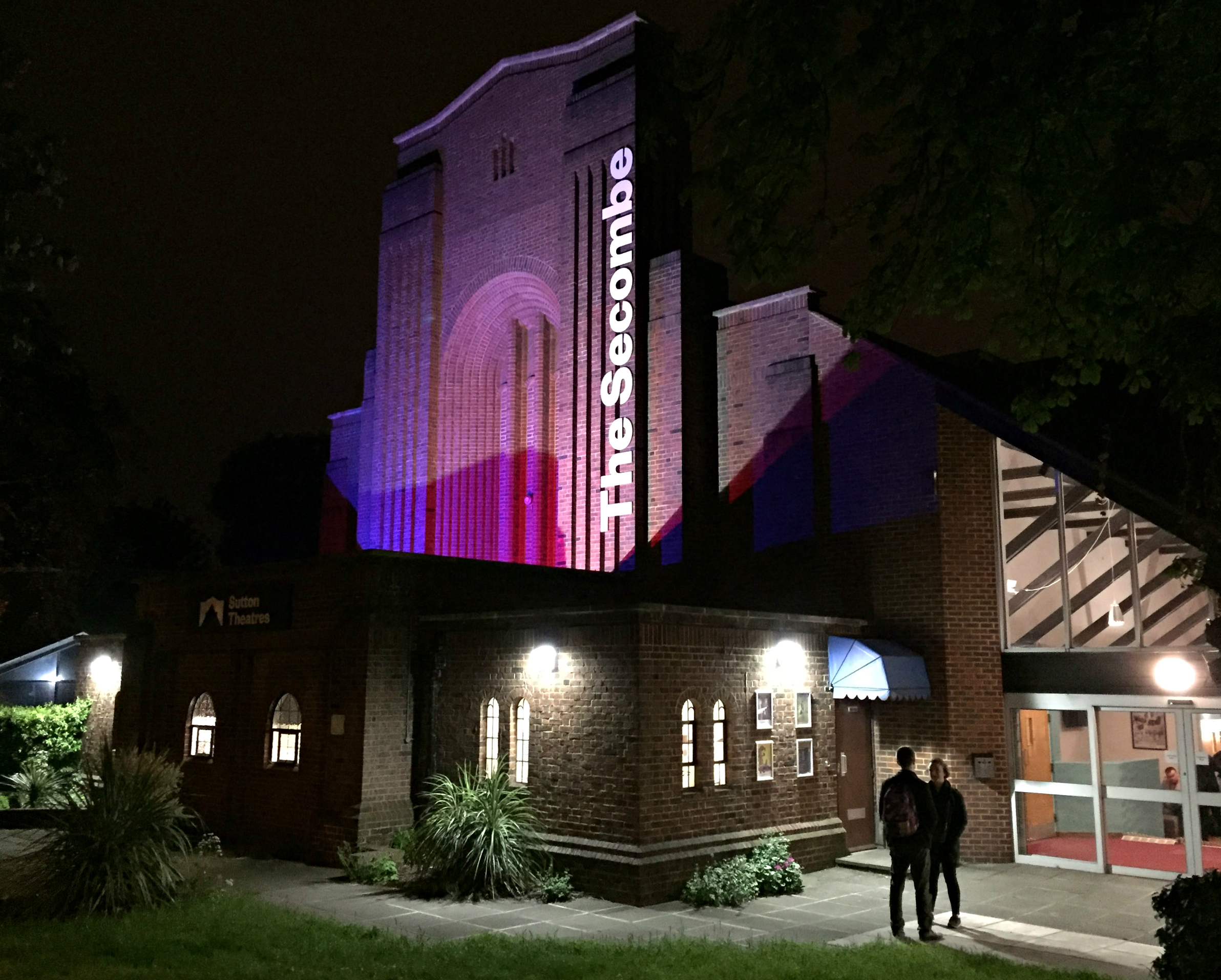

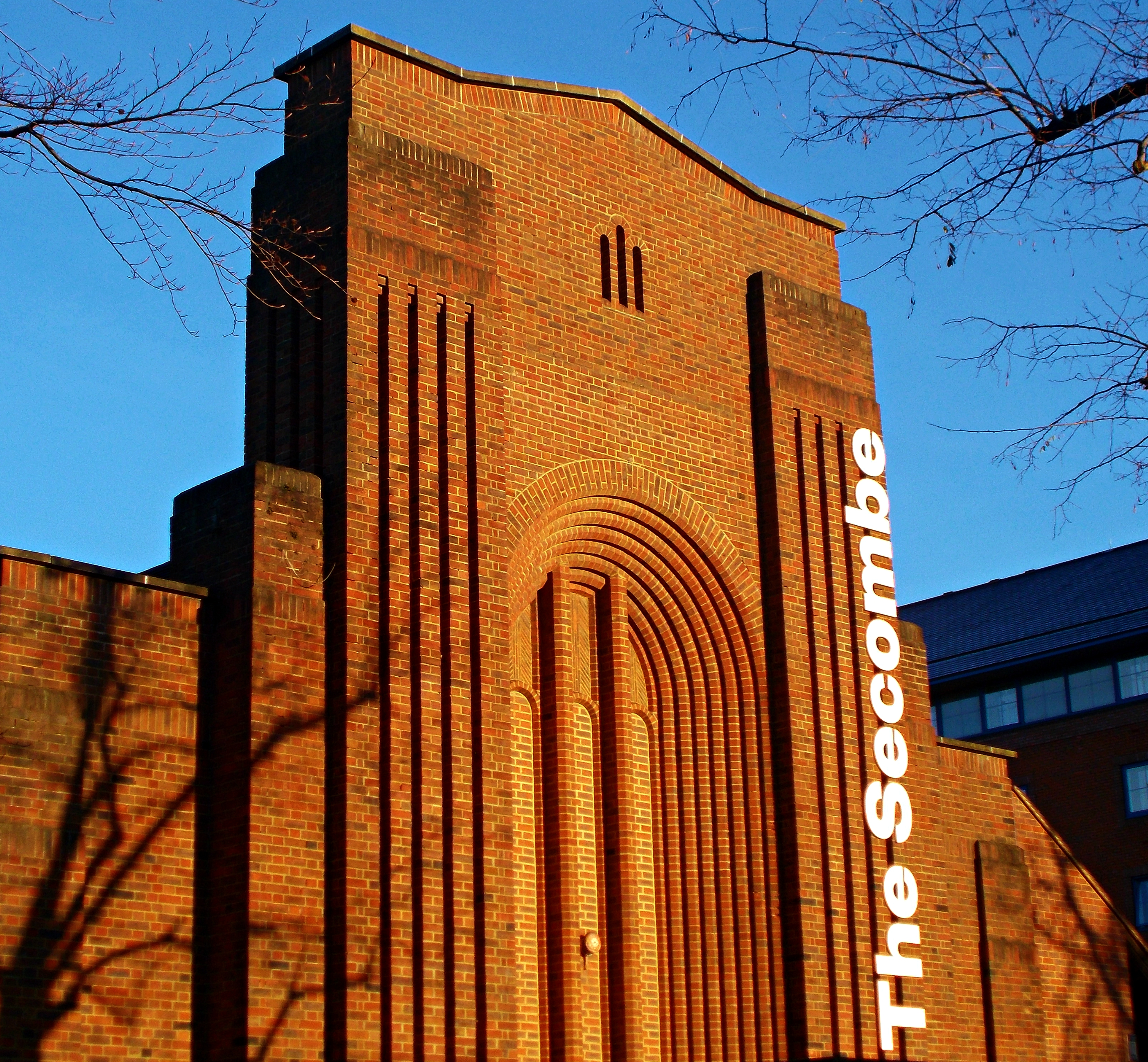
The Secombe Theatre, night and day

The Secombe Theatre (named after Sir Harry Secombe) was in Cheam Road, adjacent to the Holiday Inn hotel. The theatre was opened by Sir Harry, who lived in Sutton for over 30 years. The theatre was created in 1984 out of a former Christian Science church building dating from 1937. The theatre was operated together with the Charles Cryer Studio Theatre in Carshalton, formerly by the London Borough of Sutton. In 2014 Sutton Council requested bids to take over the running of the theatres, and in January 2015 the bid by the new "Sutton Theatres Trust" was given approval by the council's environment and neighbourhood committee to take over the theatres. In August 2016 the trust went into administration and the theatre closed permanently.

Cinema

The former Granada Cinema opened in 1934 as the Plaza Theatre in Carshalton Road, where Sutton Park House now stands. The ten-screen Empire Cinema, opened in 1991 opposite the St. Nicholas shopping centre.

Planned cultural hub

A new cultural hub, combining cinema, theatre, performing arts classes, food and drink is planned for late 2023. To be known as Throwley Yard, it will take over the premises of a former nightclub in Throwley Road in Sutton town centre. The renovation of the premises is being funded by the Government's Future High Streets Fund, and the facility will be run by Really Local Group. The local Council sees it as part of its commitment to the local economy and culture "by creating spaces for community, business, and artists to grow". It will be carbon-neutral.

=== Media ===
Along with Wimbledon Studios, Sutton is a hub for filming in south-west London.

The Return of Mr Bean was filmed in Sutton High Street.

Episodes of The Bill were filmed in Sutton.

The E4 sitcom Phoneshop, was filmed in a vacant shop unit in Sutton High Street.

Scenes for the Hollywood film Black Sea were shot outside Sutton Grammar School in 2013. Jude Law is seen getting in and out of a car, while pupils leave the school.

=== Music ===
Sutton Symphony Orchestra was founded in 1946. It has given an average of three concerts every season.

The 300 capacity Boom Boom Club in West Sutton host rock gigs.

==== The Sound Lounge ====
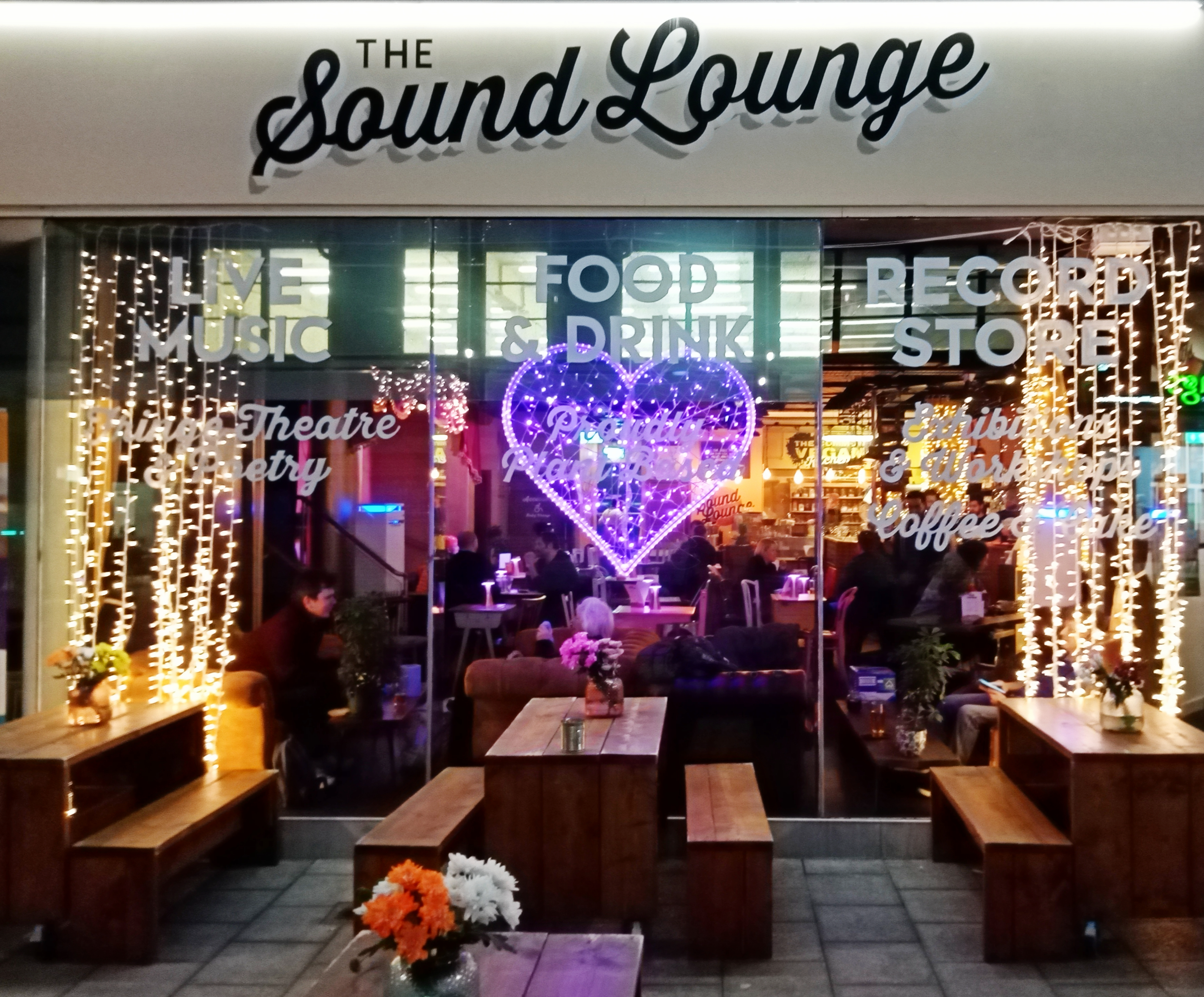
The Sound Lounge, Sutton High Street

The Sound Lounge, a grassroots concert venue, opened in December 2020 in Sutton High Street in the former premises of Royal Bank of Scotland. It hosts live performances of blues, Americana, folk and roots music. The venue includes a plant-based, carbon-neutral café, and hosts visual art exhibitions, theatre and dance. Following the easing of lockdown, it had a limited reopening in April 2021 for outdoor food and drink consumption and vinyl record sales at the Union Music Store within. As on 21 April, live music events were booked for most weekend nights as far forward as October 2021. A women's theatre event was due to take place on 27 June, and Sunday jazz afternoons with vegan roast are planned.

On 1 July 2021 the venue became the country's first grassroots music venue to be certified as carbon neutral. A wide variety of measures have been put in place to achieve neutrality. In addition to the fully plant-based menu for the café, these include getting all energy from renewable sources, not sending any waste to landfill and maintaining an allotment garden on site for zero-carbon produce for the café.

In the early hours of the 6th of September 2025, the venue had 5 panels of its front windows smashed by hammers. In aid of repairing the damage, the venue's fundraising webpage received £35,006 in community donations in less than 24 hours, with more than £40,000 being raised in total.

==== The Rolling Stones ====
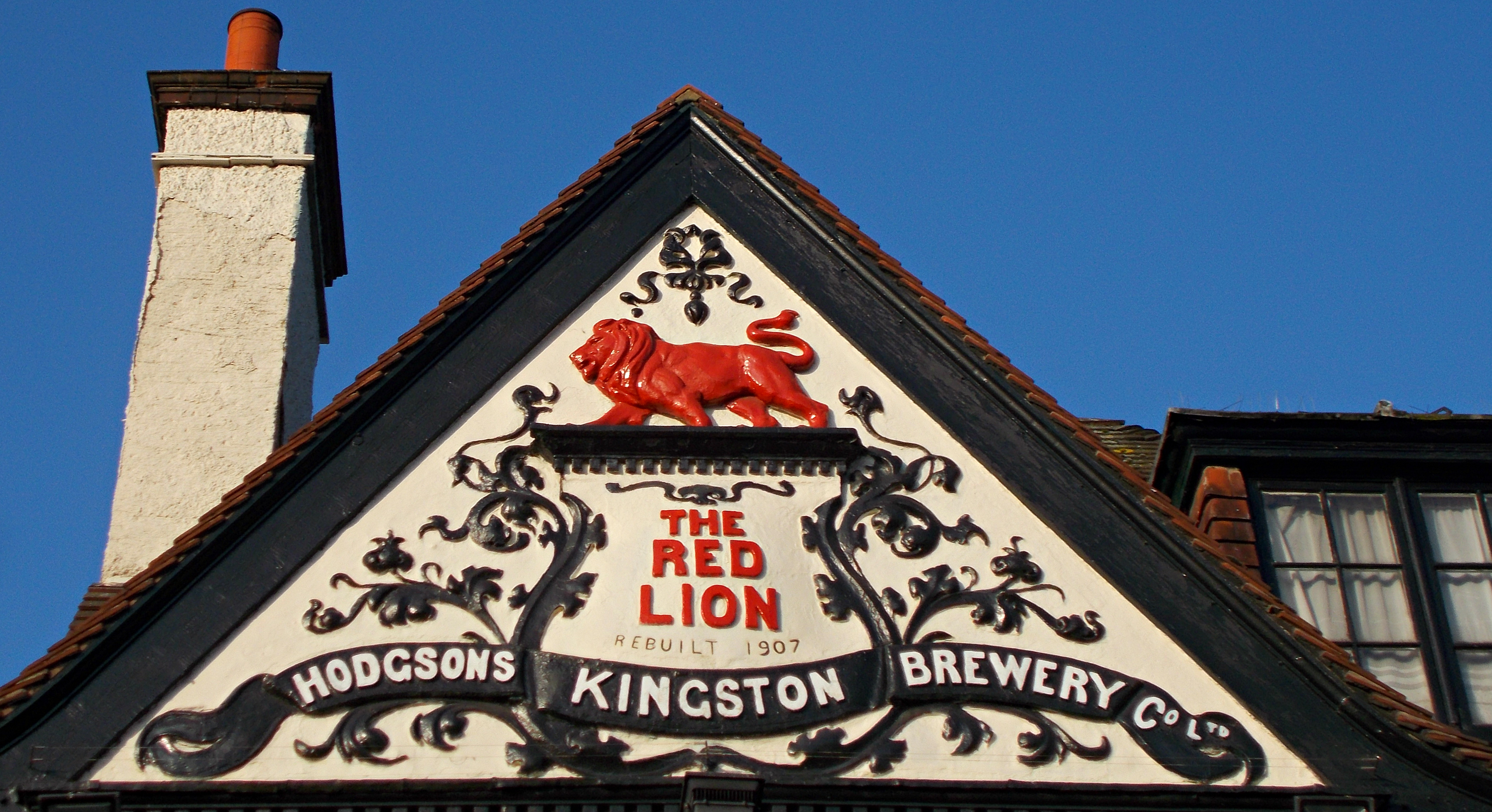
The Sutton pub where the early Rolling Stones gigs took place

The Rolling Stones were first spotted at the Red Lion public house (now the Winning Post) in Sutton High Street. The band played several early gigs there in 1963, and, during one, the audience included impresario/music manager Giorgio Gomelsky, who spotted the band and signed them up for a residency at Richmond's Crawdaddy Club, months before they made the charts. It was at the pub that Charlie Watts and Bill Wyman, on 23 January 1963, became permanent members of the band:

January 23, 1963: Charlie Watts and Bill Wyman become permanent members of the Rolling Stones with this day's gig at the Red Lion Pub in Sutton, Surrey.

In 2011, the Winning Post was added to a list of buildings and structures of local significance.

== Economy ==
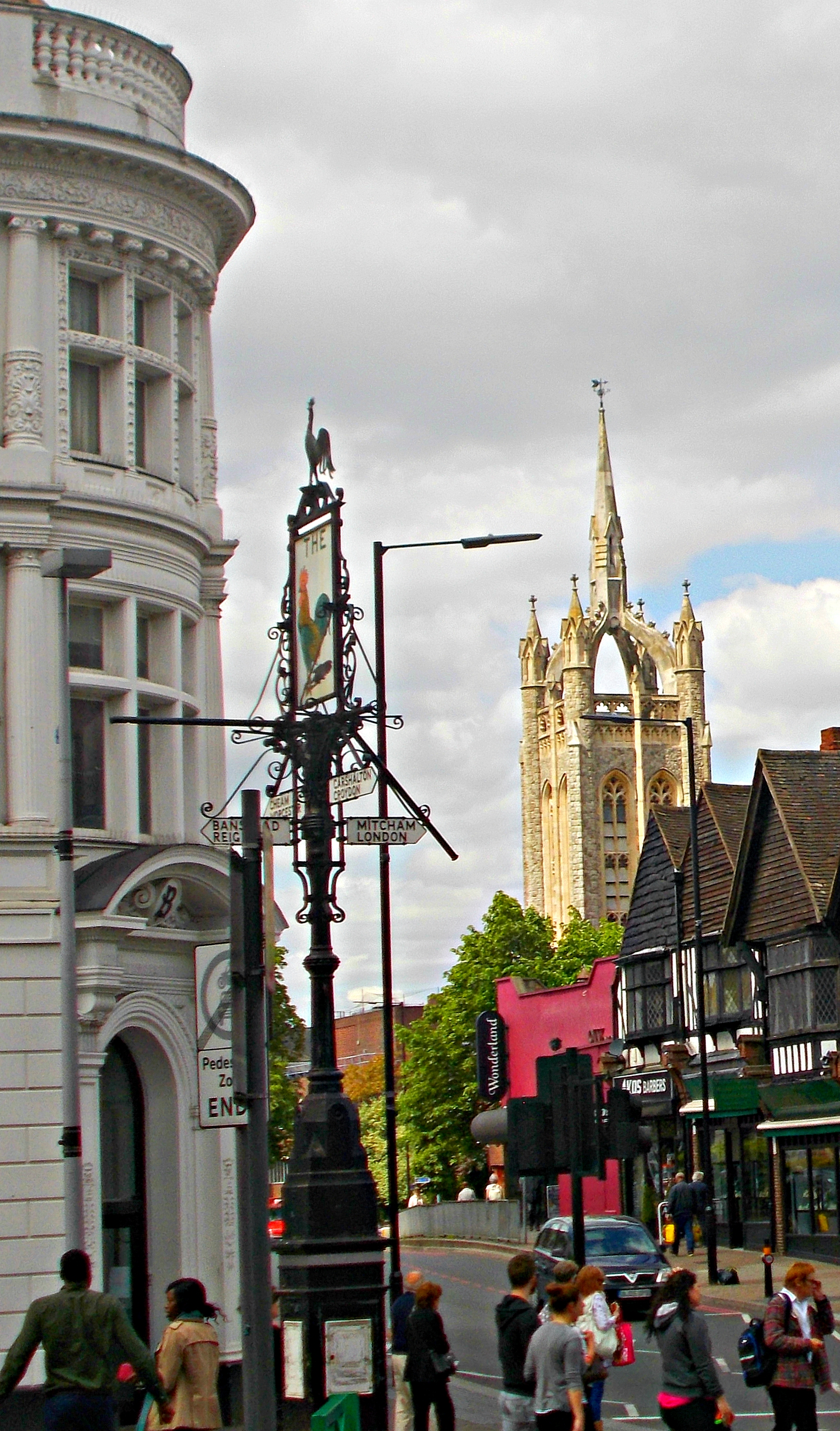
Sutton town centre

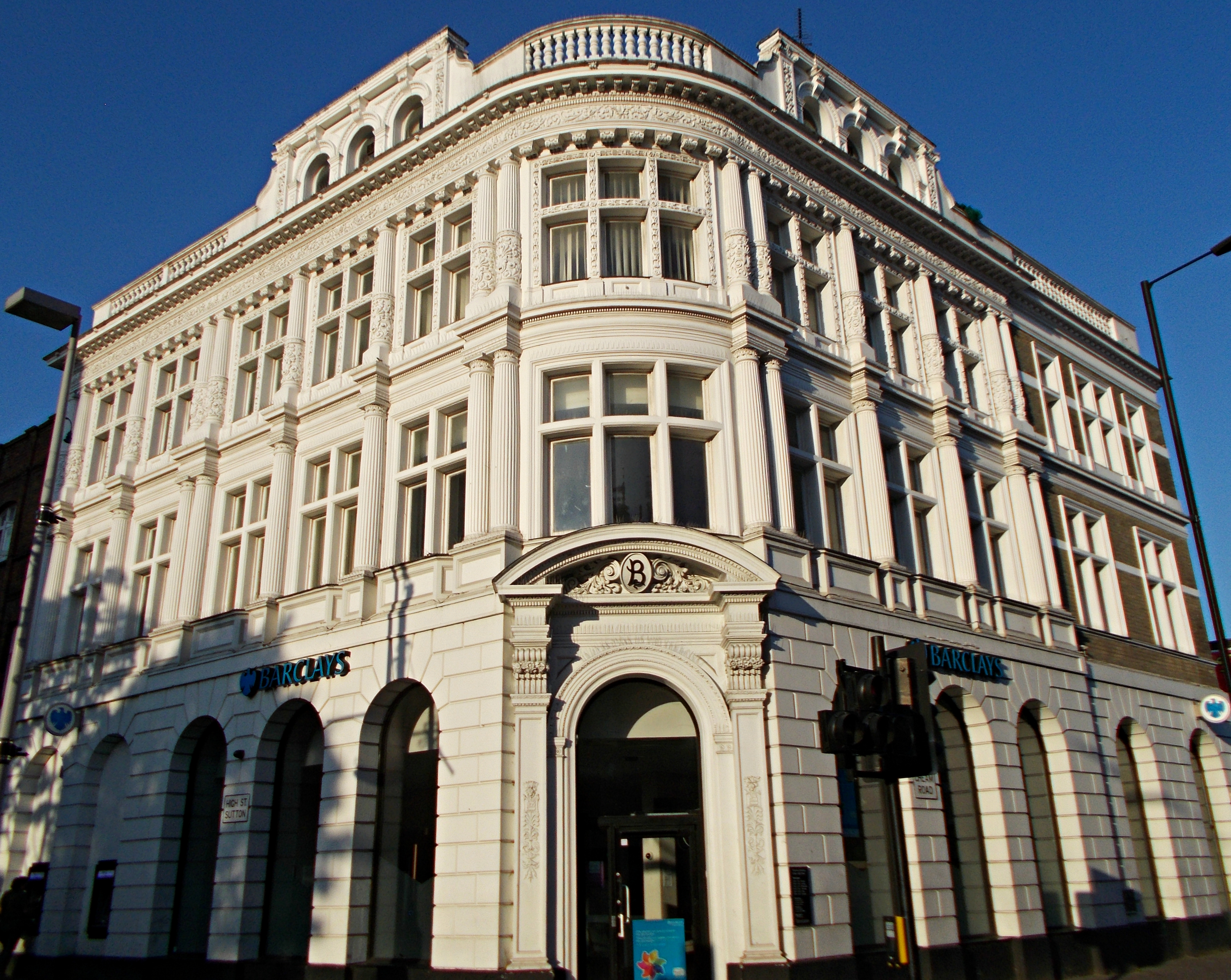
The Barclays Bank building in Sutton's shopping area

Sutton is one of the eleven major metropolitan centres identified in the London Plan in a borough that benefits from very low crime by London standards. The town contains a major retail district, centred on Sutton High Street.

Sutton has over 6,800 businesses, an increase of about 19% since 1994. 863 new companies were formed in Sutton in 2012, the highest number since records began. Most of these were small or medium-sized, but several large businesses, such as RELX, the information and analytics company, are also present and have office space in the town: RELX occupies Sutton Park House opposite the police station, and is a major local employer. Another important business locally is subsea engineering company Subsea 7.

Sutton Park House was the former office of G4S and Crown Agents Bank, a provider of the wholesale foreign exchange and cross-border payments services, was headquartered in Quadrant House, in the town centre, until 2024.

There is a town centre manager, who works in partnership with local businesses, the police and transport providers to promote the centre and its economic development. The manager acts as the focal point for a range of initiatives funded by the council and other partners. "Opportunity Sutton" and Sutton Chamber of Commerce also play a part in the local economy.

=== Health and research ===
==== Royal Marsden Hospital and Institute of Cancer Research ====
The Royal Marsden Hospital has a longstanding presence in Sutton, on a site at the southern end of the town acquired in 1962. The Institute of Cancer Research is located next to the hospital, and in 2012 the institute's Centre for Molecular Pathology opened.

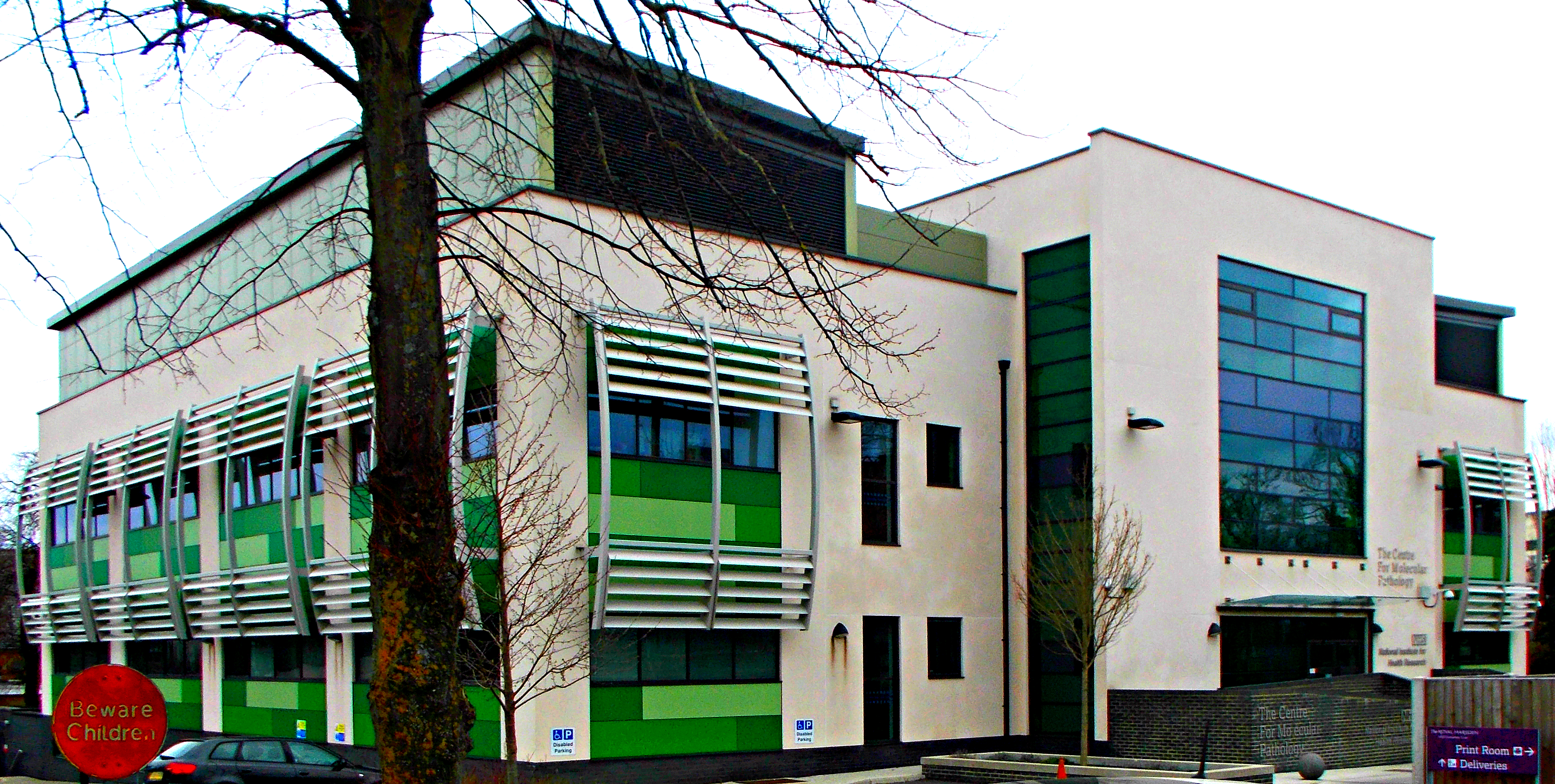
The Institute of Cancer Research

In 2014, The Royal Marsden Hospital, the Institute of Cancer Research and the co-located St Helier University Hospitals NHS Trust set out a vision for a "world class" life sciences cluster ("Sutton for Life") on the site, focusing on the provision of enhanced facilities for drug discovery. The then Mayor of London, Boris Johnson, visited the facility that year, and lent his support to the plans for what would be the world's second biggest cancer research campus.

In December 2014, the Institute was named in The Times Higher Education league table the country's leading university, ahead of Oxford and Cambridge, in recognition of its contribution to society.

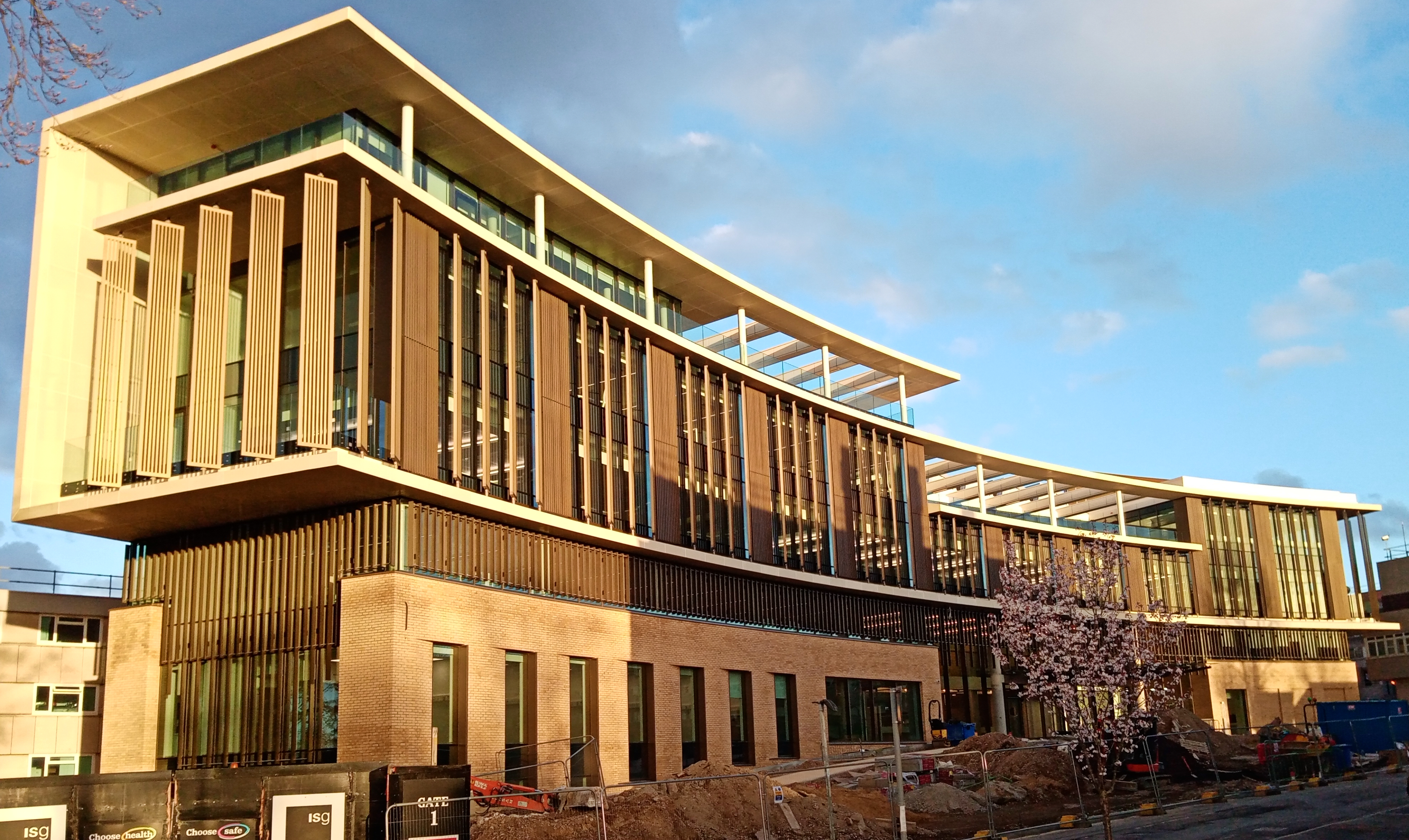
The Oaks Cancer Centre in Sutton nearing completion in April 2023

On 8 June 2023, the Oak Cancer Centre at the Royal Marsden in Sutton was opened by William, Prince of Wales, president of the trust. Funded by the Royal Marsden Cancer Charity, the centre places clinical services and research on the same site, and it houses the Charles Wolfson Rapid Diagnostic Centre, where imaging and biopsies are carried out with the aim of returning most results the same day.

==== London Cancer Hub ====
In February 2016, further plans for the site were released: the "London Cancer Hub", a partnership between the Institute of Cancer Research, the Royal Marsden NHS Foundation Trust and the London Borough of Sutton, will bring together 10,000 scientists, and clinical and support staff and provide space for biotech and pharma companies to carry our research and development. The aim is to increase the number of clinical trials and innovative drugs, and to work in partnership with industry to increase treatments for patients.

The London Cancer Hub includes a new secondary school, which specialises in the life sciences. Leisure facilities in the form of shops, cafés and hotel space for patients and families are also planned. The Hub is expected to be twice the size – at 265,000 square metres – of the existing research and treatment space. It will facilitate collaboration between different scientific fields. By 2018 the Institute of Cancer Research will develop the first phase of the plans with 20,000 square metres of drug discovery facilities.

In September 2016 Sutton Council's housing, economy and business committee approved a provisional framework of the plans. It was noted that site's transformation would attract a total investment of £1 billion over its lifetime.

In March 2021 it was announced that a new "Innovation Gateway" would open in the London Cancer Hub in Sutton in late 2021. The first business occupying the Innovation Gateway, a medical technology company developing a technology platform to support personalised dose administration, moved in during July 2022.

In October 2021, the Centre for Cancer Drug Discovery, sited in a new 7,300 square metre building costing £75 million, was opened by Princess Anne.

=== Town centre regeneration ===
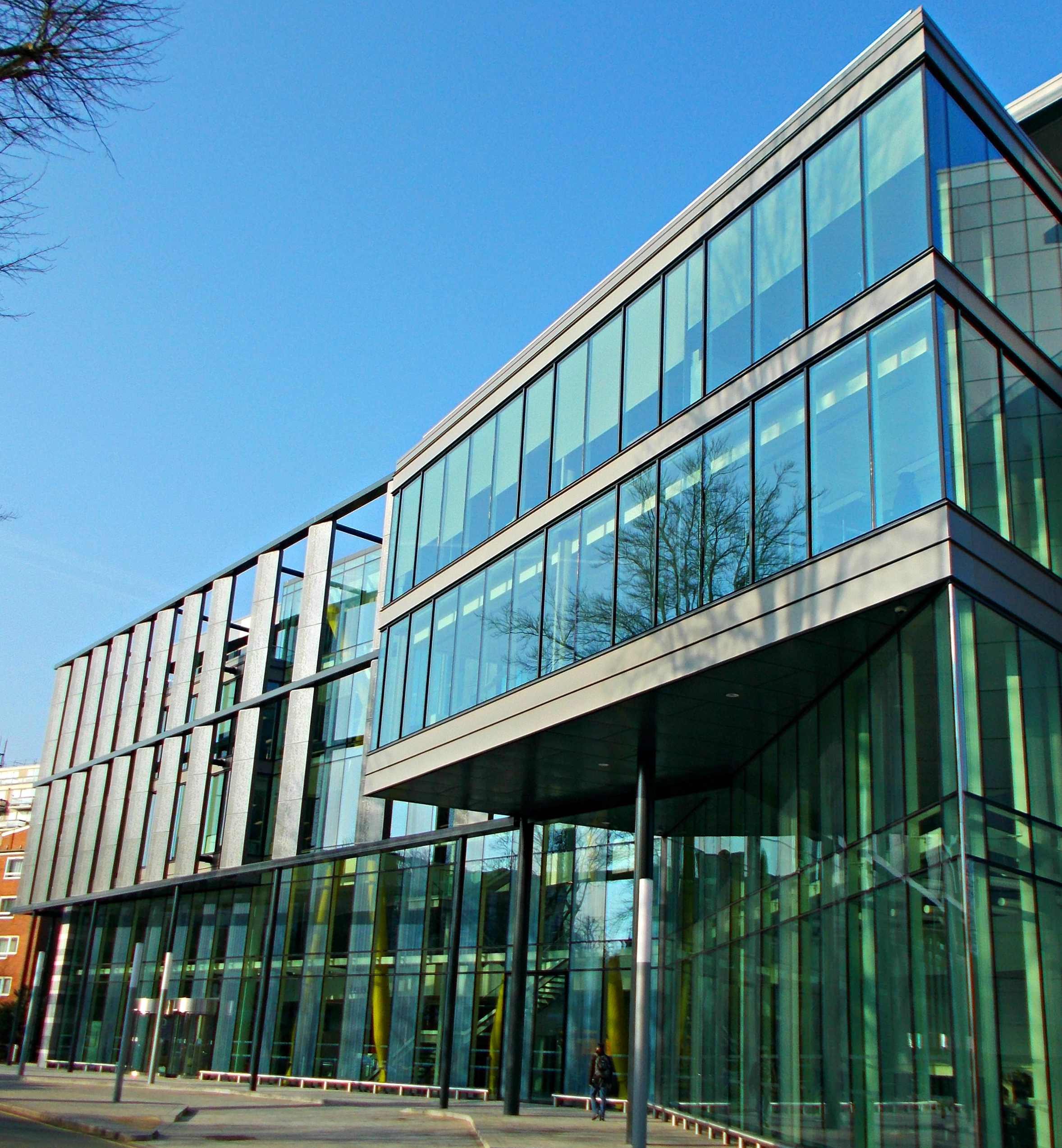
The new headquarters of Subsea 7

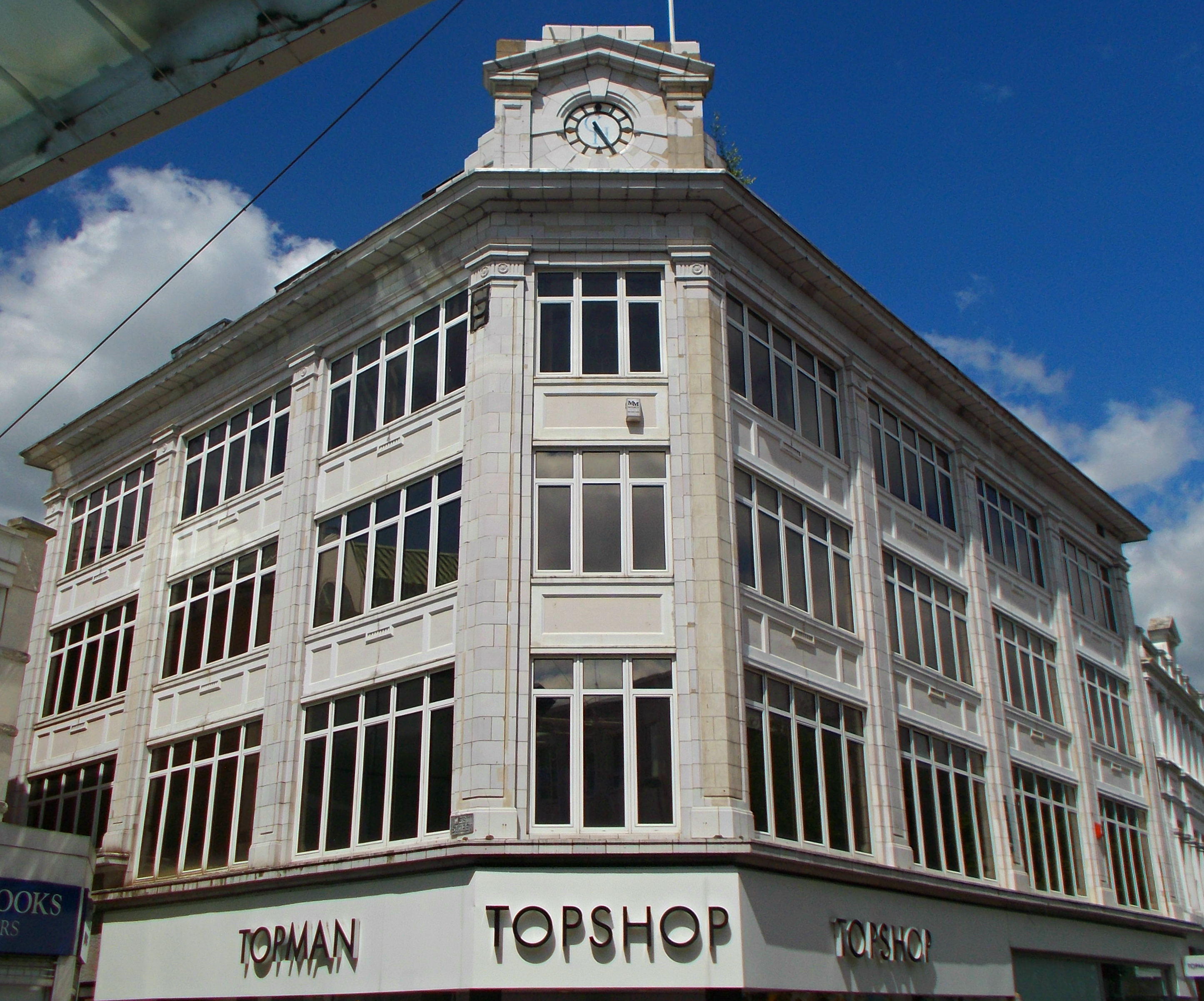
Art deco High Street building

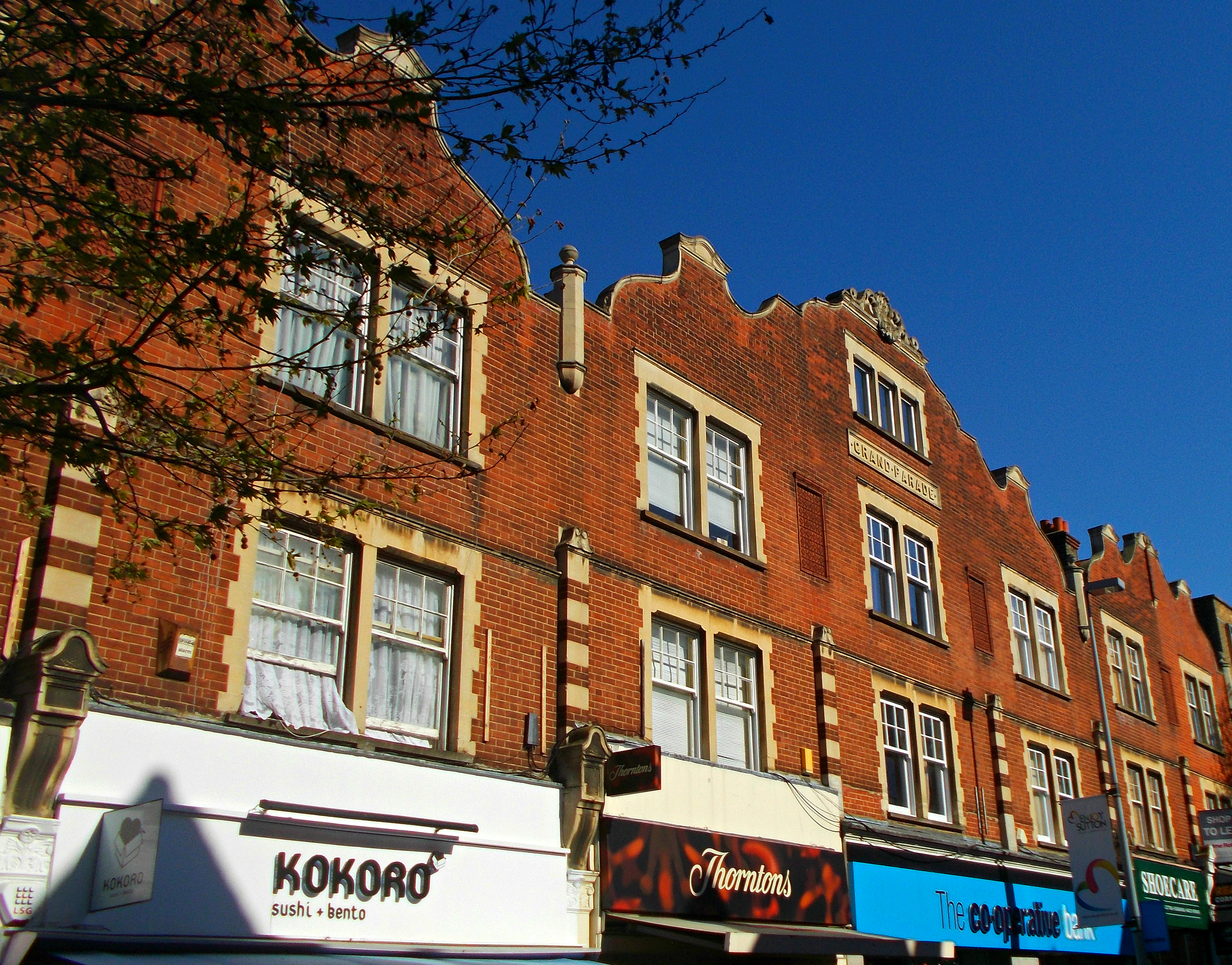
Grand Parade, Sutton High Street

Several major building projects are underway or have recently been completed in the town centre:

Sutton Point, at the southern end of the town centre, will include a hotel, apart-hotel, apartments (with a car club), a health club, shops, restaurants and office space. Construction of the £90 million scheme was awarded by the developer CNM Estates to the building firm Ardmore Group, and was due for completion in December 2018.

The Old Gas Works, a major development by LXB Retail Properties at the north end of the High Street, including apartments, a Sainsbury's supermarket, retail units and a landscaped square with fountain was completed in 2016. The scheme represented a £50 million investment in the town.

Subsea 7 has expanded in Sutton, making it the site of its new world headquarters. The firm moved within the town to a new, purpose-built, five-storey, 17,500 square metre office building. Four hundred jobs were created, mainly by relocation, taking the workforce in Sutton to 780. Construction of the £39 million development by Galliford Try started in 2014, and was completed in late 2016.

In September 2015 the council appointed a design team led by Bilfinger GVA to produce plans covering the next 15 years for the central area of the town. The plans include identifying sites for new housing and commercial space, a possible new primary school and improved transport links, including the introduction in 2020 of Sutton Link Tramlink trams to Sutton station. The plans require the retention of the "high-quality Victorian, Edwardian and Mock Tudor buildings that reflect the historic core of the town centre"

In June 2016 a masterplan titled "Sutton 2031: Planning for our Future" was published by the council. Its plans include new developments, enhanced public space and improvements to transport. It will include:

- "A range of immediate High Street projects"
- "Transforming the St Nicholas Centre"
- "Creating a new south London destination with culture, leisure and restaurant activity"
- "Redeveloping the Civic Centre"

The council plans to sell several properties, including the Civic Centre site, Sutton Library, Russettings, and the disused Secombe Theatre, to develop new homes, including affordable housing. Over the next ten years, the St Nicholas Centre will be replaced with higher-quality buildings featuring shops, restaurants, bars, new council offices, a library, and a community hub.

==== Heritage Action Zone ====
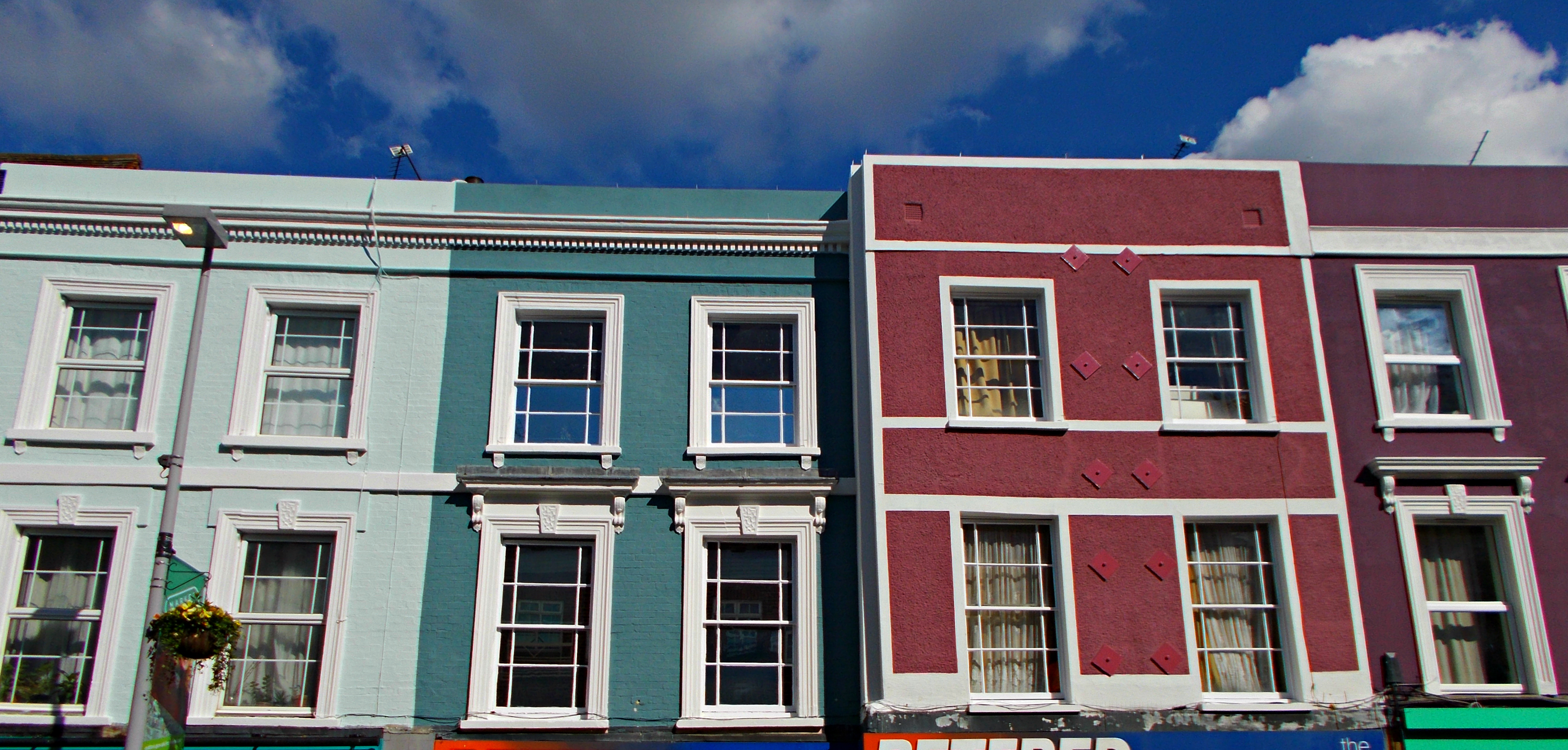
Multicoloured facades in the Heritage Action Zone in Sutton town centre

In March 2017 it was announced that Sutton town centre had been designated one of the first ten Heritage Action Zones by Historic England. Gaining this status will unlock resources to enhance the historic environment, including the conservation area, to encourage economic growth. Heritage will be made a central consideration for new developments in the area to retain the town's distinct architectural nature.

=== Retailing ===
Retailing history

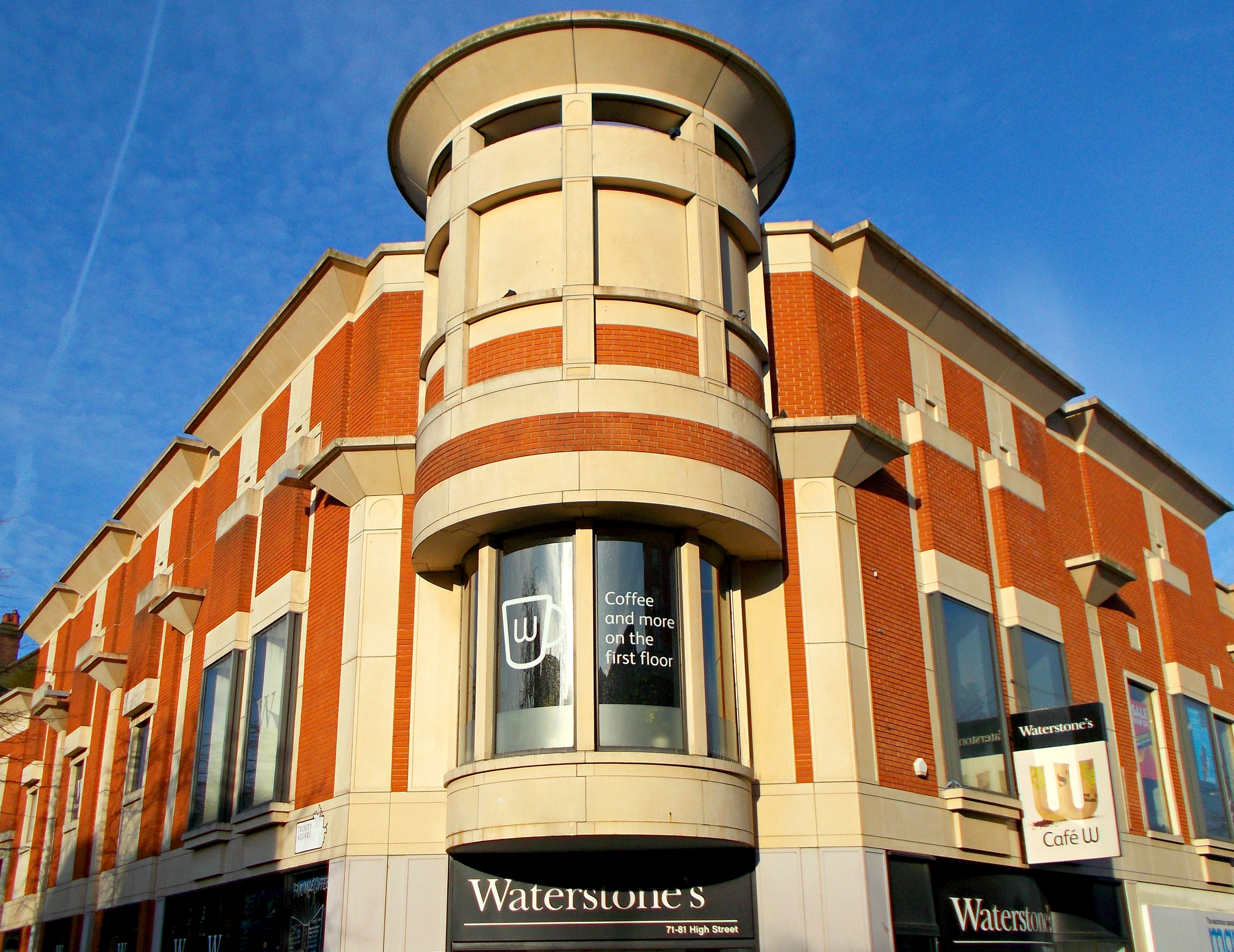

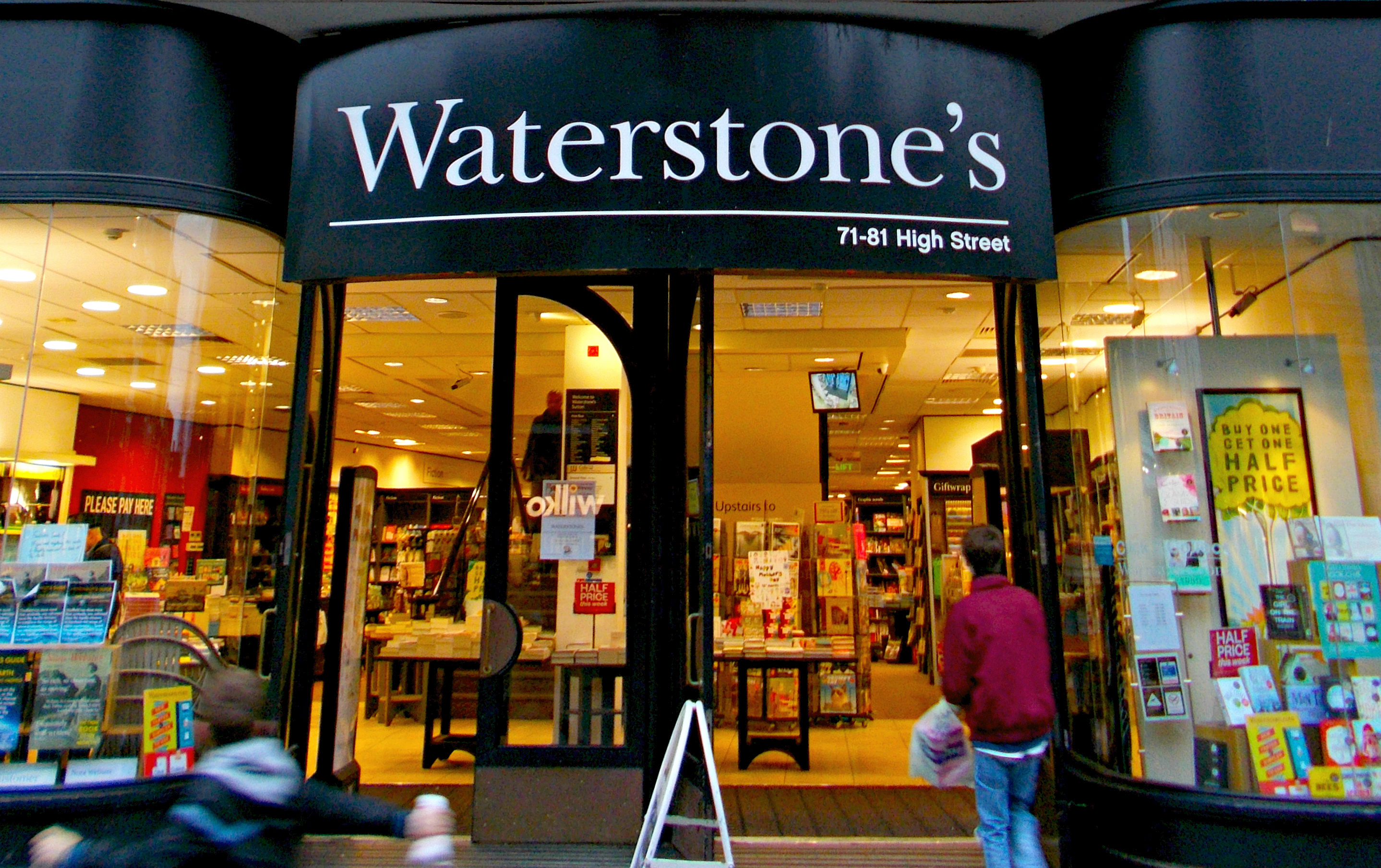
Waterstone's Bookshop

Retailing has been a major part of the Sutton economy since the Victorian era. The oldest retail business currently operating in Sutton, Pearson Cycles, dates from the 1860s – it was originally a blacksmith shop, but in the 1890s changed to bicycle making and repair. The Pearsons have run the cycle business from the same High Street location ever since. It has been recognised by Guinness World Records as the oldest bicycle shop in the world.

Retail environment

Sutton is London's sixth most important retail centre, and attracts shoppers from a wide area. Sutton High Street runs for nearly a mile from Sutton Green to Sutton station, and hosts many of the country's main high street names.

It is often the chosen location for new retail ventures, for example the Sutton branch of the Waterstones bookshop chain was the first to have a café installed.

Shopping centres

There are two covered shopping centres situated near the middle of the retail area. The larger of these is the St. Nicholas Centre with three levels, and five levels for the former Debenhams anchor store. Times Square is the smaller one – it opened in 1985, and was re-launched in 2017 following a refit. "The refit was assessed as being of high quality and making a significant contribution to the regeneration of the town centre."

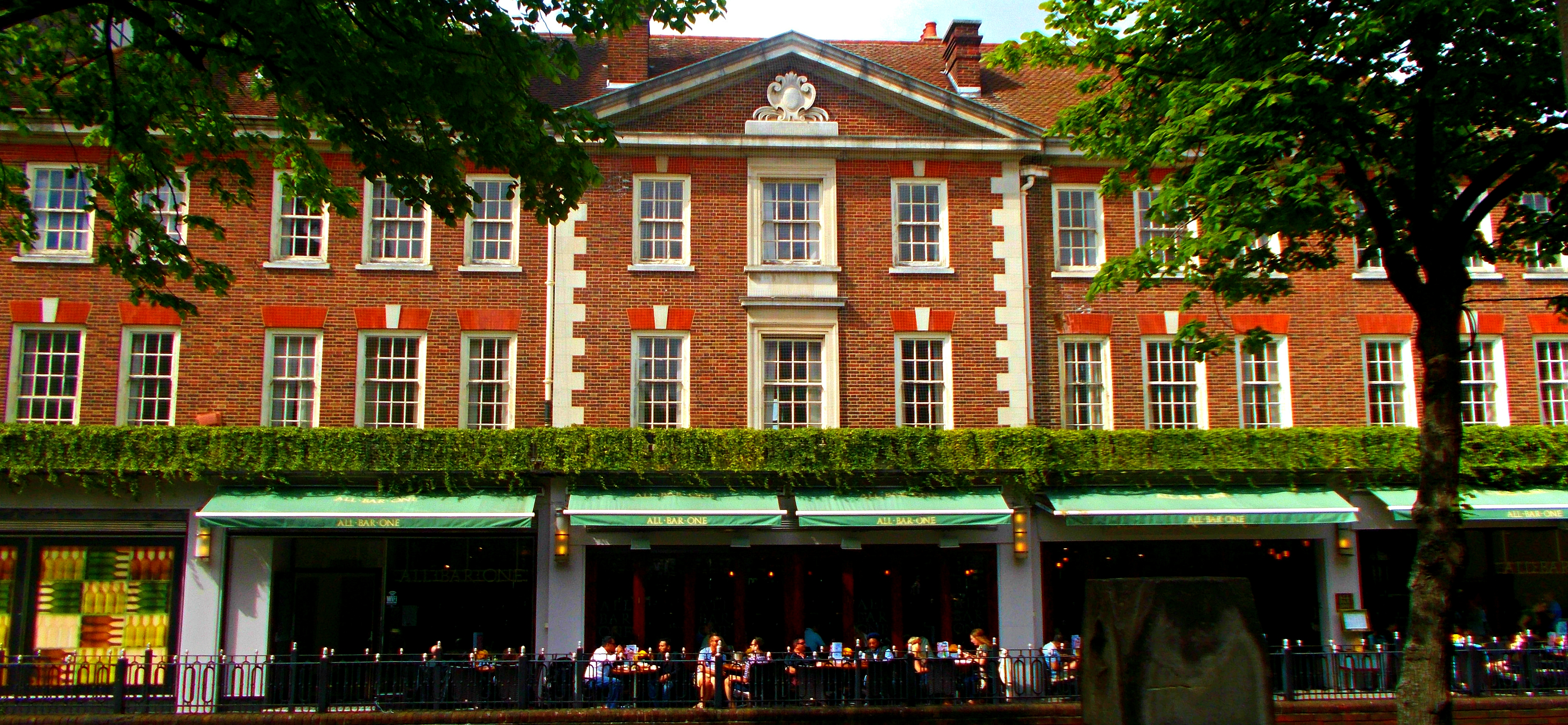
All Bar One, Sutton

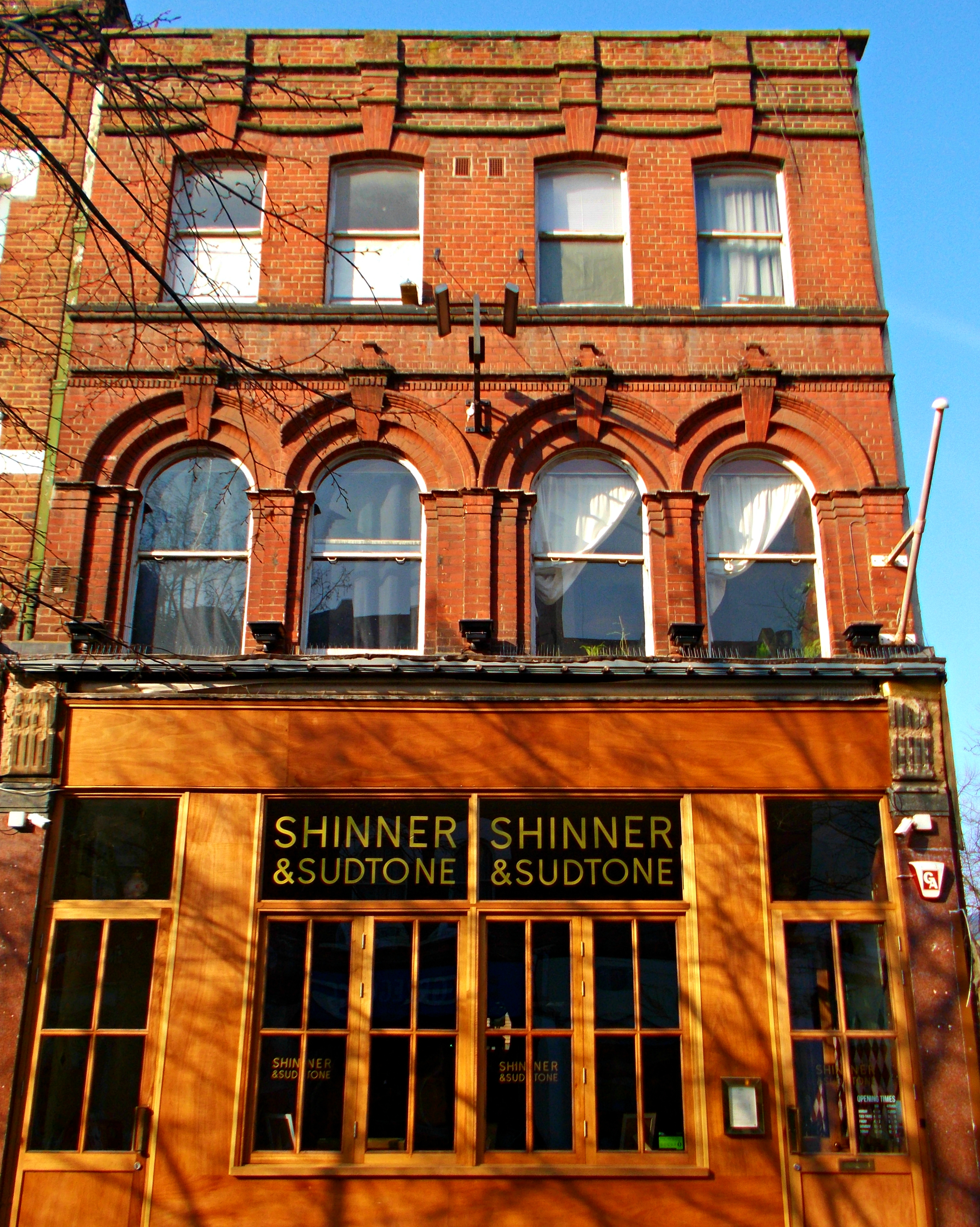
The Shinner and Sudtone pub on Sutton High Street

Restaurants and bars Sutton has several restaurants, patisseries, coffee bars, gastropubs and bars. The central area is pedestrianised, and the extra space encourages the provision of pavement seating.

Sutton's range of restaurants has expanded in recent years, and now includes examples of French, Lebanese, British, vegan, Malaysian, Thai, Pakistani, Portuguese, Turkish, Sri Lankan and Japanese cuisine, in addition to the more longstanding Italian, Indian and Chinese establishments. One French restaurant was in the 2013 Good Food Guide and was Michelin-listed then.

Pop-up market

A "pop-up" market is held every month at the northern end of Sutton High Street. It is part of a programme to support local entrepreneurs starting their own business. Products and crafts on sale include natural cosmetics, jewellery and handmade clothing.

Street performance

The high street and town square host street performances, including music, arts and theatre. Markets are held from time to time, including French, Italian and Continental markets, as well as arts and crafts fairs.

In August and September the high street hosts the outdoor "Sunset Cinema," where films are shown in the evening to an audience seated in deckchairs. The scheme, the only one of its kind in London, aims to encourage greater use of local restaurants and bars. The High Street has hosted a country music festival with live music and dancing for the last two summers. A temporary mini-golf course is set up during August.

Green wall

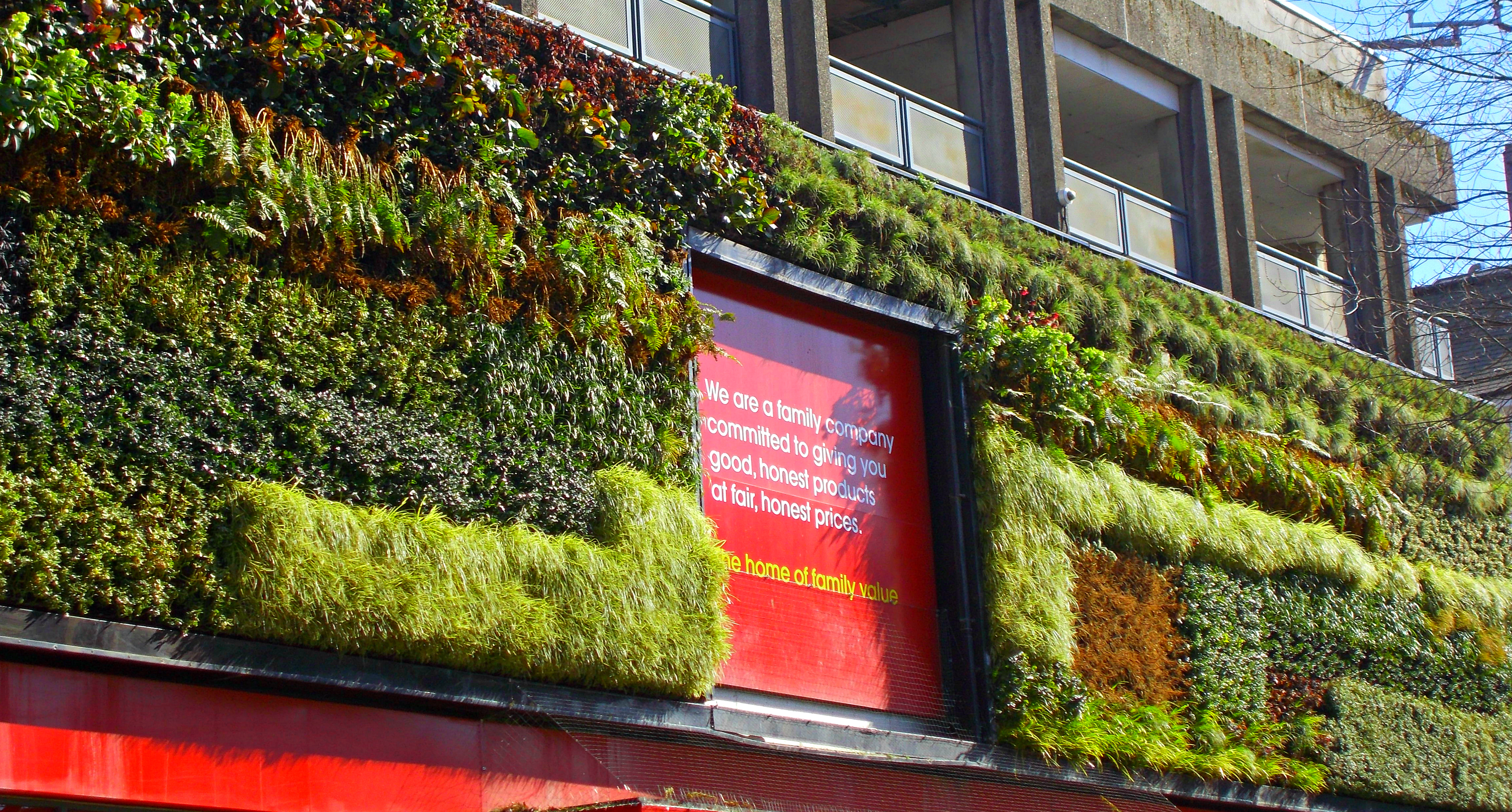
The Green Wall in Sutton town centre

There is a green wall or "vertical garden" in the shopping area, designed aesthetically and to improve air quality and biodiversity. It provides additional breeding and nesting options in the vicinity and safeguards local flora and fauna. It helps to offset the carbon footprint, lowers the heat island effect of the urban area and reduces smog from traffic fumes. The green wall covers the façade of a large High Street store, and is in bloom all year round.

== Transport ==
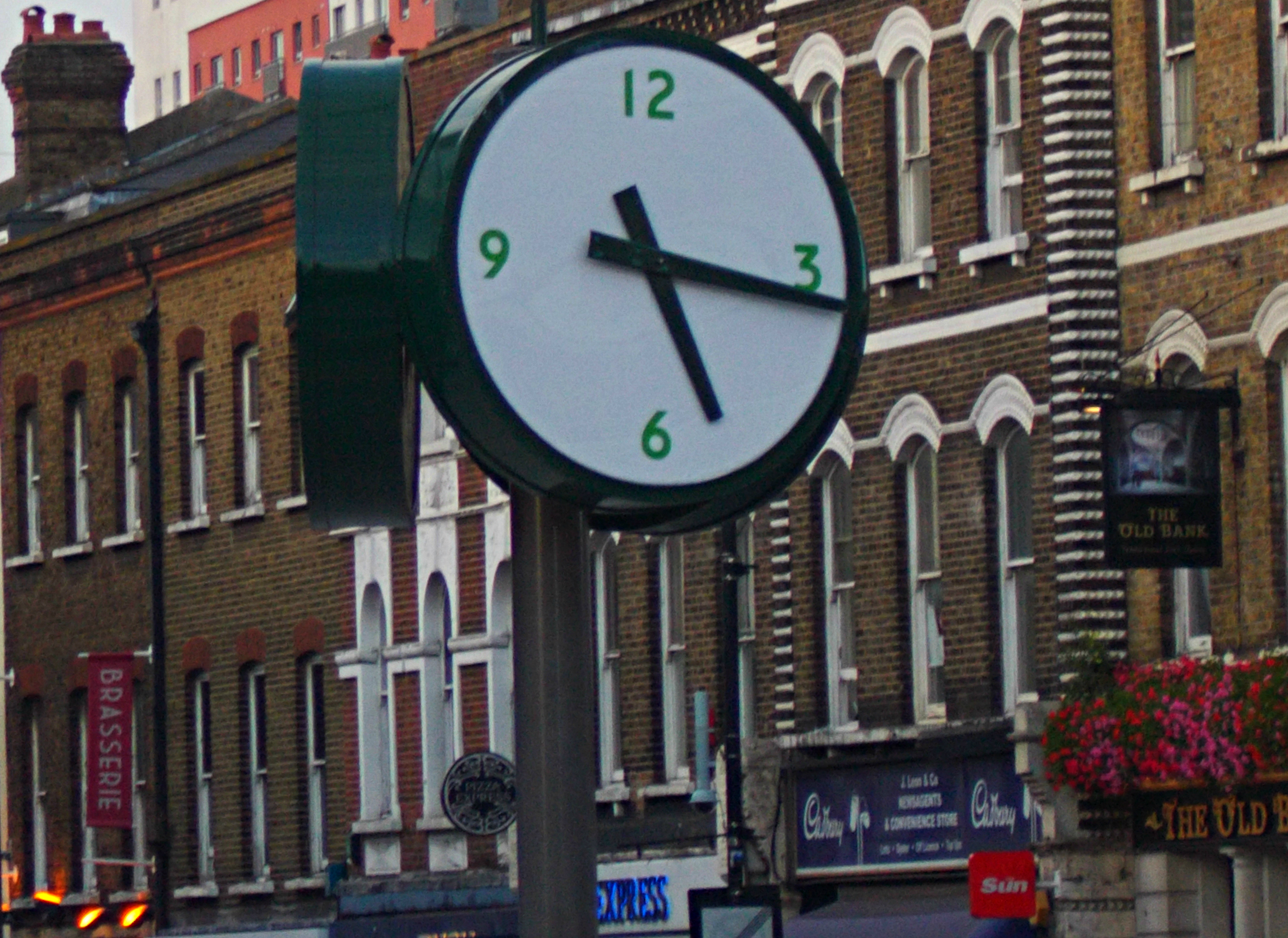
Clock installed in 2015 opposite the mainline station

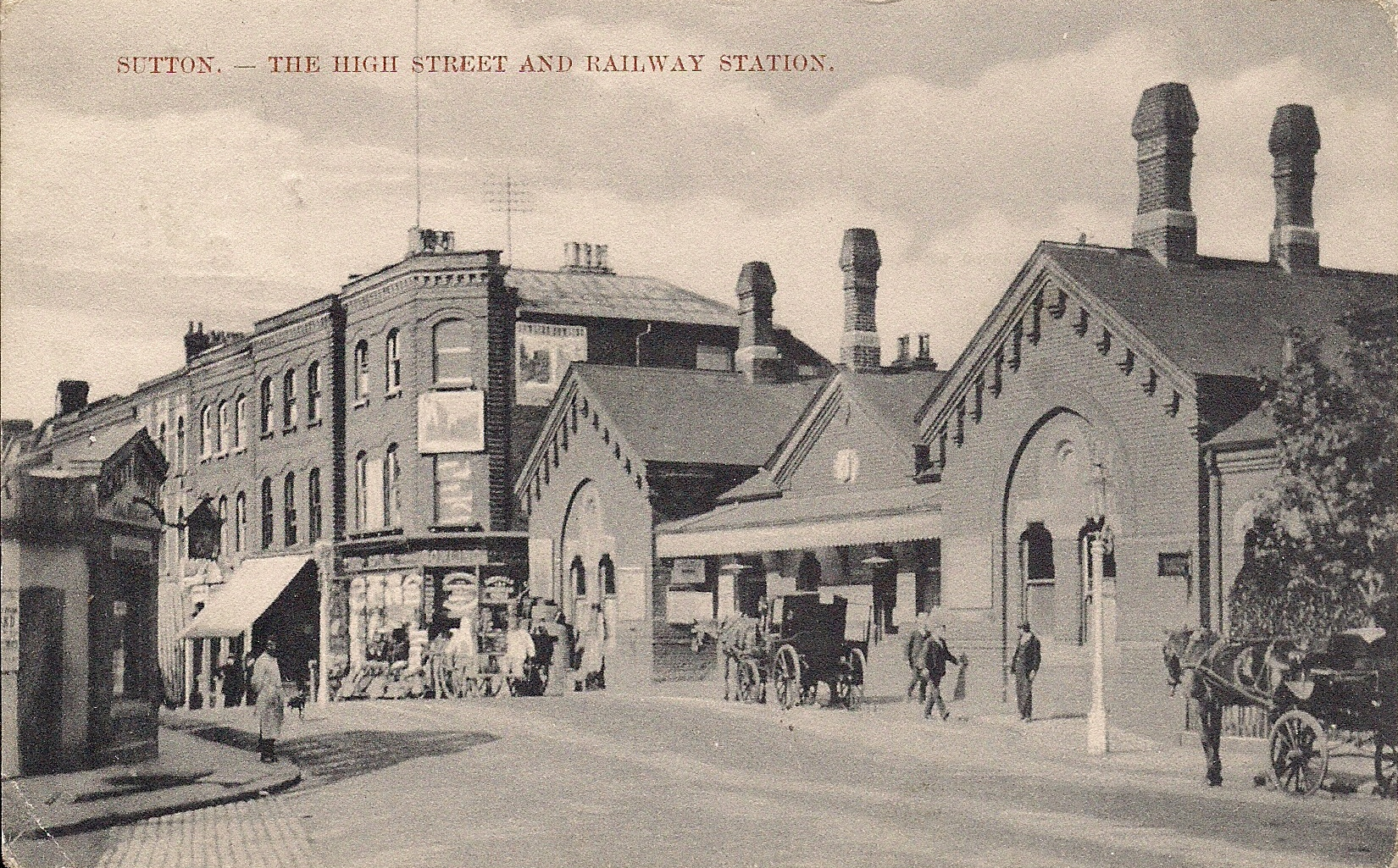
The former Sutton station c. 1905

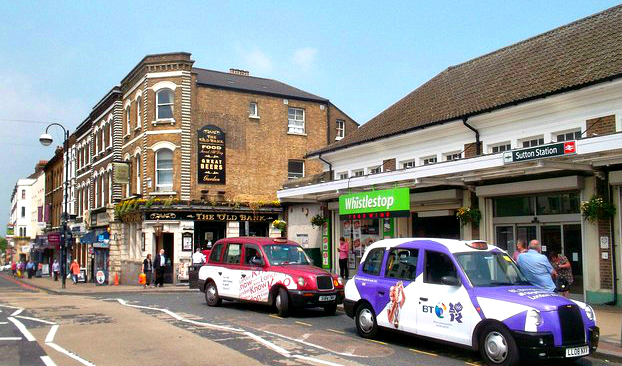
Taxis by Sutton station in 2012

Sutton station is the town's major station, from where frequent direct trains run to several main central London stations − London Victoria, London Bridge, Blackfriars, City Thameslink and, for Eurostar services, St Pancras International. The station is served by Thameslink and Southern.

The fastest of the Victoria-bound trains from Sutton station take 25 minutes (stopping at Carshalton and Clapham Junction).

As well as these direct trains to central London, there are also direct services to destinations outside central London including Banstead, Dorking, Epsom, Leatherhead, Luton, Horsham, St Albans, West Croydon and Wimbledon.

West Sutton and Sutton Common stations are both on the Thameslink lines to Wimbledon and on to central London direct. Being on the Thameslink line, they continue on to stations both within and the other side of London.

Local bus services are operated by London General, London United, Transport UK and Metrobus. There are express coach services to Heathrow Airport and Gatwick Airport.

Road traffic is diverted away from a largely pedestrianised town centre, and there are many designated cycle routes in Sutton, along with links to neighbouring towns. There are three main car parks in the town centre and a car club.

=== Sutton Tube Station ===
In the early 1920s, Sutton was slated to become part of the London Underground network by creating a Sutton Underground Station. The plan was for Sutton to serve as the final stop for both the Northern Line and the District Line. To facilitate this, the Wimbledon to Sutton route was constructed. However, due to the outbreak of World War I, funding shortages led to the Northern Line extension being halted at Morden, and Sutton remained and still remains without direct underground service

=== Sutton Link and Tramlink ===
In 2014 a consultation was held into options for the route of a proposed Tramlink extension from Wimbledon to Sutton. The Sutton Link was a proposed new tram line in South London, connecting Sutton Train Station to Colliers Wood Tube Station via St Helier. Proposed since the early 2000s, consultations on the proposed route took place in the late 2010s. A preferred route was announced in February 2020, with the Sutton-to-Colliers-Wood alignment being selected. However, financial issues caused by the COVID-19 pandemic led Transport for London to put the project on hold in July 2020. The plan would later be revisited in the London Plan 2021.

== Notable people ==
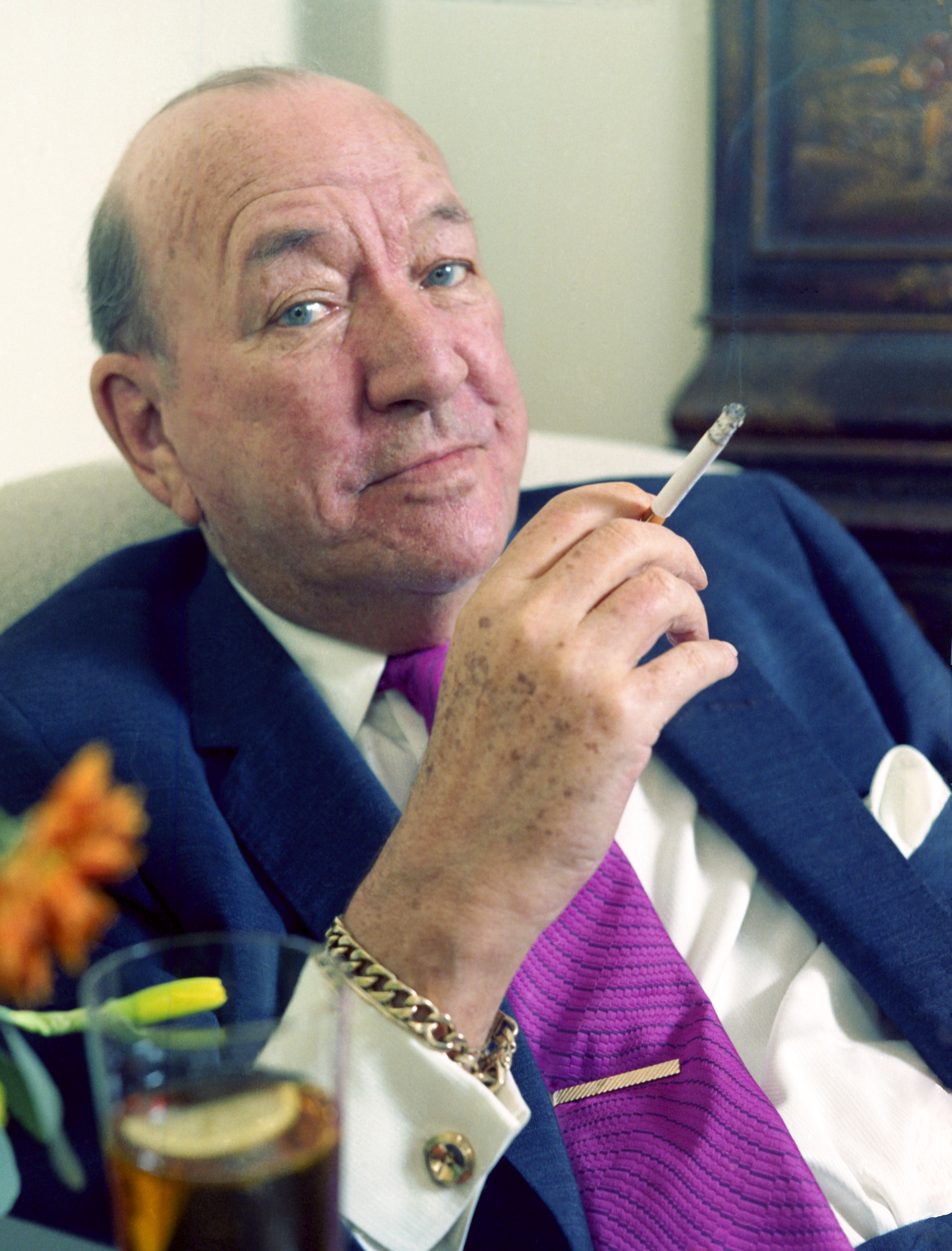
Noël Coward

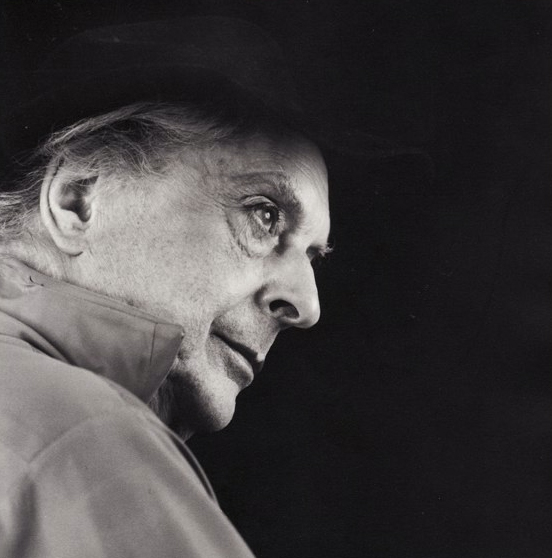
Quentin Crisp

See London Borough of Sutton for a complete borough-wide list. The individuals listed below are specifically linked to the town of Sutton.

- Martin Adams, professional darts player, was born in Sutton
- Joan Armatrading, singer-songwriter and musician, lived in Sutton in the 1970s
- Ben Barnes, actor, attended Homefield Preparatory School
- David Bellamy, broadcaster and botanist, attended Sutton Grammar School
- Sally Bercow, wife of the former Speaker of the House of Commons, John Bercow
- Johnny Borrell, guitarist, singer and frontman of the band Razorlight
- Alec Clifton-Taylor, architectural historian and broadcaster, was born in Sutton
- Noël Coward, actor and playwright, lived in Lenham Road between the ages of seven and ten
- Constance Cox, playwright and scriptwriter, born in Sutton
- James Cracknell, Olympic gold medallist in rowing
- Quentin Crisp, writer, author, raconteur was born in Sutton
- Clark Datchler, lead singer of Johnny Hates Jazz
- Jack Draper, professional tennis player, born in Sutton
- Brett Goldstein, actor, comedian and writer, was born in Sutton in 1980
- Charles Hazell, recording artist better known by the stage name Sketchman, was born in Sutton in 1988
- Catherine Holman, actress, born in Sutton.
- Jon Hiseman, drummer with the pioneering progressive jazz-rock band Colosseum, died in Sutton
- James Hunt, racing driver and 1976 Formula One World Champion, lived in Sutton as a child
- Archibald Joyce, waltz composer, at 75 Langley Park Road from 1932 until his death in 1963.
- Penelope Keith, actress, and famous for her role in The Good Life, was born in Sutton
- Ruth Kelly, former Labour Party member of parliament and Transport Secretary, attended Sutton High School
- Rebecca Litchfield, photographer, was born in Sutton
- Bradley McIntosh, member of former chart topping band S Club 7, attended Greenshaw High School
- Robbie McIntosh, air guitarist first strummed his tennis racket in Sutton High Street
- Katie Melua, award-winning singer, songwriter and musician, lived in Gander Green Lane, Sutton
- Phyllis Mudford King (1906–2006), Wimbledon ladies doubles winner 1931 attended Sutton High School
- Brian Paddick, Baron Paddick, the British Liberal Democrat politician, attended Sutton Grammar School for Boys

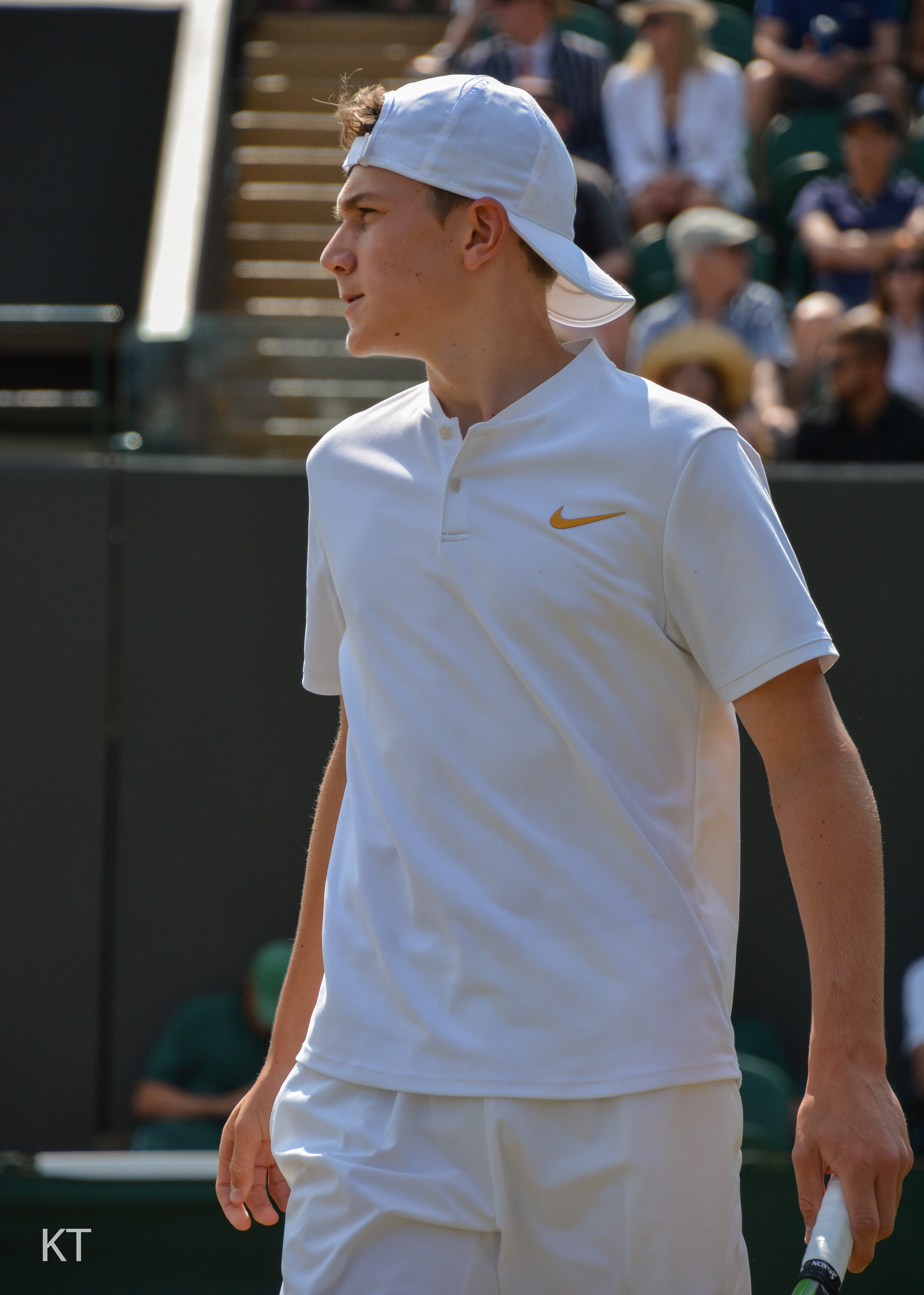
Jack Draper

- Peter Penfold, diplomat, attended Sutton Grammar School.
- Sidney Richard Percy, painter, lived in Mulgrave Road, Sutton.
- Frank Potter, artist and art teacher, was born in Sutton in 1896.
- Michael Reeves, film director and screenwriter, best known for the 1968 film Witchfinder General
- Gavin Roynon, cricketer and military historian, was born in Sutton.
- Dora Russell (born Dora Black, 1894–1986), author, feminist and progressive campaigner, attended Sutton High School.
- Sir Harry Secombe, the humourist, singer, comedian, entertainer and member of the Goon Show cast, was a local resident and personality. The Secombe Theatre in Sutton is named after him.
- Jack Skipper, comedian, born in Sutton
- Marianna Spring, disinformation correspondent for the BBC, attended Sutton High School.
- Ian Stewart, co-founder of The Rolling Stones.
- Graham Sutherland, painter, etcher and designer, attended Homefield Preparatory School, Sutton.
- Baron Tope of Sutton, Liberal Democrat politician
- Tyler West, DJ and TV presenter
- Helen Young, BBC Weather presenter and former BBC Weather Centre manager lives here
- Zacron, born Richard Drew, designer of the Led Zeppelin III album cover

== Education ==
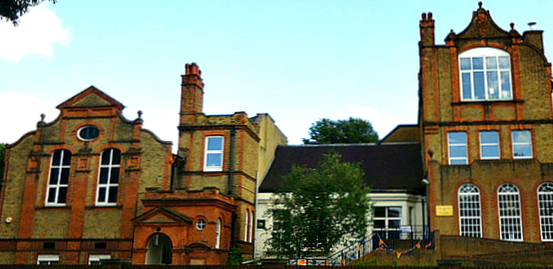
Sutton High School for Girls

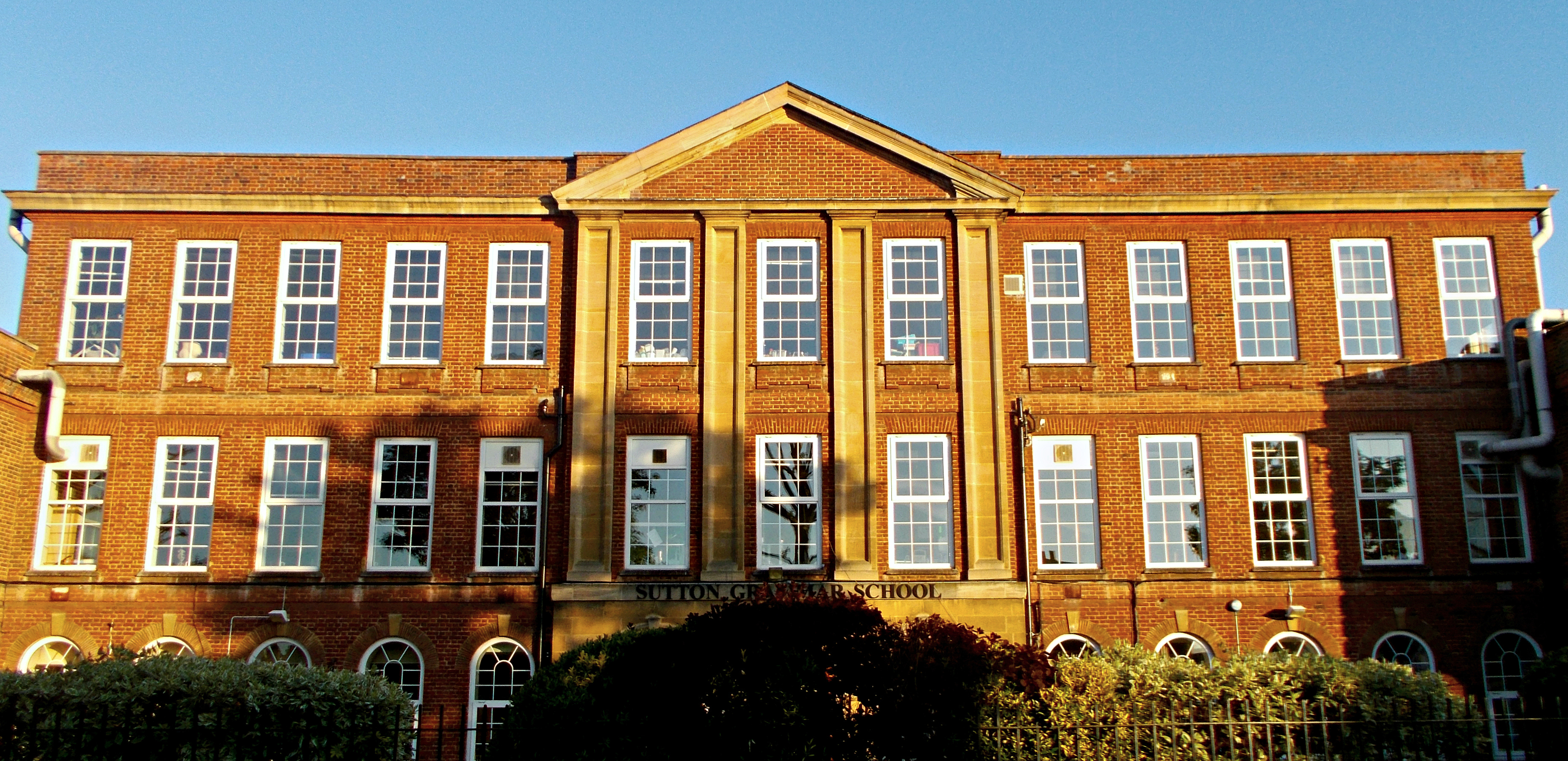
Sutton Grammar School

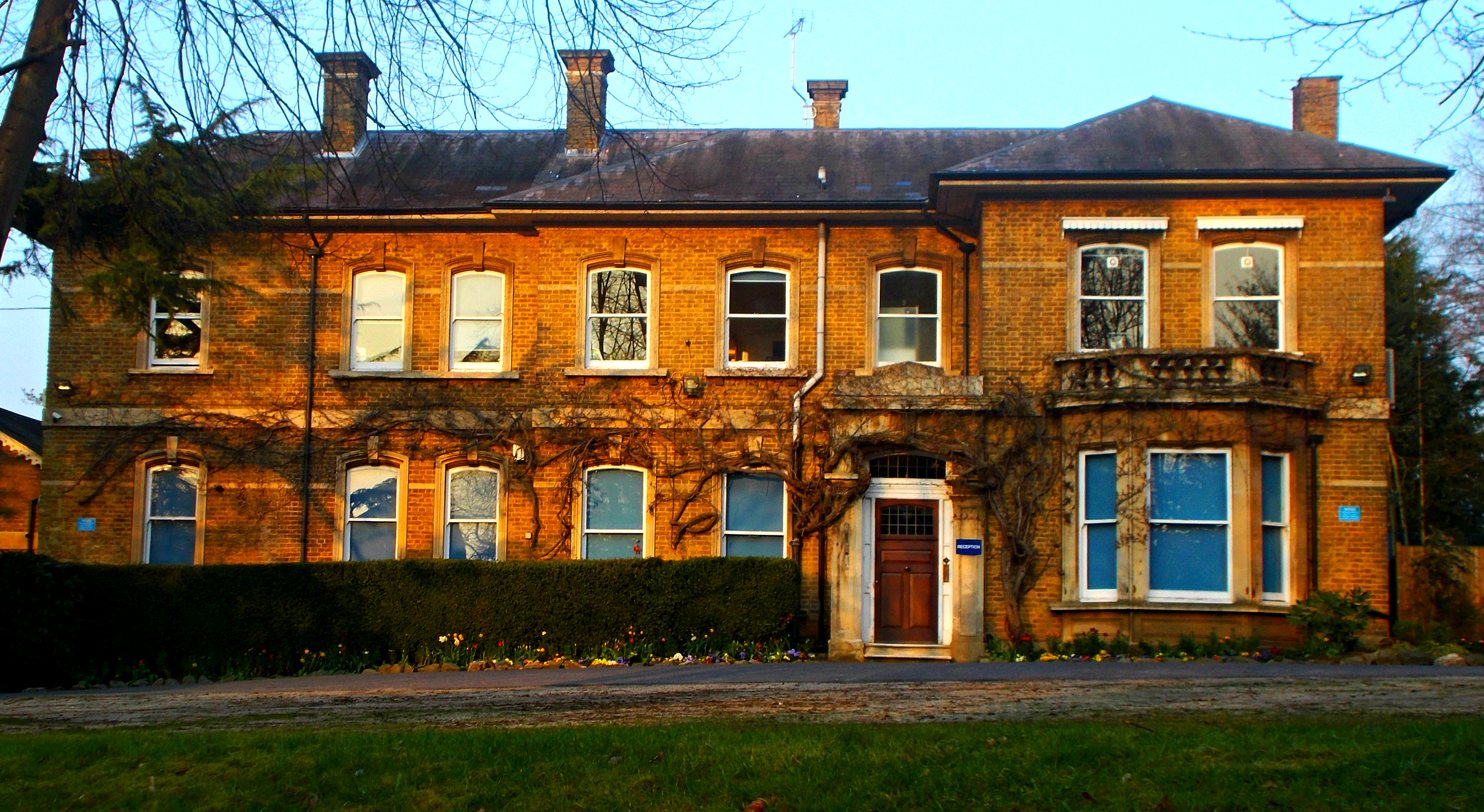
Eagle House School

=== Schools ===
Sutton is the principal town in the London Borough of Sutton, a top performing borough for education. The town is home to a significant number of the borough's schools, including one of its boys' grammar schools, its boys' preparatory school and its girls' private secondary school.

Primary schools

- All Saints Benhilton, C of E Primary
- Brookfield Primary School
- Avenue Primary
- Devonshire Primary
- Homefield Preparatory School
- Manor Park Primary
- Robin Hood Infants
- Robin Hood Junior
- Westbourne Primary

Secondary schools

- Glenthorne High School
- Greenshaw High School
- Overton Grange School
- Harris Academy Sutton
- Sutton Grammar School
- Sutton High School for Girls (independent school)
- Eagle House School (specialist autism school)

In 2013 Sutton's GCSE performance was second across all boroughs in England. In 2011 Sutton was the top performing borough in England. For more performance information see London Borough of Sutton.

=== Adult education ===
The main centre of Sutton College, originally named Sutton College of Liberal Arts, is based in Sutton. The college offers over 1000 part-time courses at its borough-wide centres.

== Sport ==
Sutton United F.C. were relegated from EFL League Two, the 4th level of the English football pyramid, at the end of the 2023–2024 season. They had been promoted to the league for the first time in their 123-year history after winning the 2020-21 National League. Nicknamed The U's, they famously beat Coventry City in the FA Cup in 1989. In 2016–17 they reached the 5th Round of the FA Cup for the first time, beating three Football League teams. Sutton United's ground is Gander Green Lane.

Sutton Common Rovers F.C. play in the Isthmian League South Central Division.

Sutton Cricket Club is based in Cheam Road. The club's 1st XI plays at the highest level of the sport available to it, the Surrey Championship Premier Division, which they won in 2009.

Cheam Hockey Club is a field hockey club that competes in the London Hockey League.
