= 2026 Sutton London Borough Council election =

2026 English local government election

- 7 May 2026

All 55 seats to Sutton London Borough Council 28 seats needed for a majority
- Turnout: 73,670; 46.78%
	First party	Second party
Leader	Barry Lewis
Party	Liberal Democrats	Reform
Last election	29 seats, 39.6%	N/A
Seats won	51	2
Seat change	▲23	▲2
	Third party	Fourth party
Leader		Dave Tchil
Party	Independent	Labour
Last election	3 seats, 3.6%	3 seats, 16.9%
Seats won	1	1
Seat change	▼4	▼2
- Map of the results
Leader before election
Barry Lewis
Liberal Democrats
Leader after election
Barry Lewis
Liberal Democrats

The 2026 Sutton London Borough Council election took place on 7 May 2026. All 55 members of Sutton London Borough Council were elected. The elections took place alongside local elections in the other London boroughs and elections to local authorities across the United Kingdom.

Prior to the election, the council was under Liberal Democrat majority control. They significantly increased their majority at this election, winning 51 of the council's 55 seats. The Conservatives, which had been the second largest party prior to the election, were wiped out. Labour was reduced to one seat and Reform gained two.

== Background ==
In 2022, Liberal Democrats retained control of the council. In 2025, the deputy leader of the council resigned triggering a by-election.

== Previous council composition ==
After 2022 election		Before 2026 election		After 2026 election	
Party	Seats	Party	Seats	Party	Seats
Liberal Democrats	29	Liberal Democrats	28	Liberal Democrats	51
Conservative	20	Conservative	20	Reform	2
Labour	3	Labour	2	Labour	1
Independent	3	Independent	5	Independent	1

Changes 2022–2026:

- March 2024: Sheila Berry (Labour) resigns – by-election held May 2024
- May 2024: Catherine Gray (Conservative) gains by-election from Labour
- March 2025: David Bartolucci (Liberal Democrats) disqualified due to non-attendance – by-election held April 2025
- April 2025:
  - Richard Choi (Liberal Democrats) wins by-election
  - Amy Haldane (Liberal Democrats) resigns – by-election held May 2025
- May 2025: Lisa Webster (Liberal Democrats) wins by-election
- March 2026:
  - Timothy Crowley (Conservative) leaves party to sit as an independent
  - Patrick Ogbonna (Liberal Democrats) leaves party to sit as an independent

== Election result ==
Council composition after the 2022 election

Council composition after the 2026 election

2026 Sutton London Borough Council election
Party	Candidates	Seats	Gains	Losses	Net gain/loss	Seats %	Votes %	Votes	+/−
Liberal Democrats	55	51	22	-	▲22	92.73	44.39	89,454	▲4.79
Reform	55	2	2	-	▲2	3.63	20.11	40,531	NEW
Labour	55	1	-	1	▼1	1.82	5.97	12,019	▼10.93
Independent	5	1	-	2	▼2	1.82	1.94	3,897	▼1.66
Conservative	55	0	-	21	▼21	-	17.05	34,355	▼19.15
Green	55	0	-	-	Steady	-	10.50	21,166	▲6.9
CPA	1	0	-	-	Steady	-	0.04	86	Steady

== Results by ward ==
=== Beddington ===
Beddington (3)
Party	Candidate	Votes	%	±%
Independent	Nick Mattey	1,316	42.5	+2.8
Liberal Democrats	Sue Ebanks	1,220	39.4	+16.6
Liberal Democrats	Rob Leah	1,202	38.8	+19.5
Independent	Tim Foster	1,188	38.3	+0.8
Independent	Tim Crowley	1,153	37.2	−0.1
Liberal Democrats	Chante O'Shaughnessy	1,075	34.7	+15.4
Reform	Barrie Collins	669	21.6	New
Reform	Lesley Smith	617	19.6	New
Reform	Christine Trenholme	564	18.2	New
Green	Annabelle Bouilov	391	12.6	+1.3
Green	Michael Boulton	331	10.7	New
Green	Helen Didymus-True	327	10.5	New
Labour	Allan Black	291	9.4	−9.9
Conservative	Alison Huneke	285	9.2	−12.9
Labour	Sarah Gwynn	273	8.8	−7.8
Conservative	John Rawlinson	267	8.6	−11.4
Labour	Ian Turner	230	7.4	−8.3
Conservative	Julia Szucs	220	7.1	−12.5
Independent hold		Swing		
Liberal Democrats gain from Independent		Swing		
Liberal Democrats gain from Independent		Swing		

=== Belmont ===
Belmont (3)
Party	Candidate	Votes	%	±%
Liberal Democrats	Chandra Alapati	2,130	68.7	+31.1
Liberal Democrats	Joseph Barkham	1,888	60.9	+25.2
Liberal Democrats	Rashi Barsaiyan	1,819	58.7	+28.3
Conservative	Neil Garratt	1,284	41.4	−5.1
Conservative	Mukesh Rao	1,236	39.9	−6.4
Conservative	Lily Bande	1,143	36.9	−5.9
Reform	Paul Campbell	719	23.2	New
Reform	Adrian Noble	642	20.7	New
Reform	William Smith	613	19.8	New
Green	Virginia Fuster-Velert	445	14.4	+2
Green	Libby Standbridge	419	13.5	New
Green	August Wood	353	11.4	New
Labour	Marian Wingrove	201	6.5	−11.2
Labour	Gale Blears	181	5.8	−10.4
Labour	Elaine Kwamin	175	5.6	−8.7
Liberal Democrats gain from Conservative		Swing		
Liberal Democrats gain from Conservative		Swing		
Liberal Democrats gain from Conservative		Swing		

=== Carshalton Central ===
Carshalton Central (3)
Party	Candidate	Votes	%	±%
Liberal Democrats	Andrew Jenner	2,459		
Liberal Democrats	Isabel Araujo	2,398		
Liberal Democrats	Jake Short	2,392		
Reform	Angela Ellis-Jones	809		
Reform	Barry Greening	757		
Reform	Lauren Simpson	745		
Green	Verity Thomson	673		
Conservative	Derek Fitzgibbons	607		
Conservative	Jill Sparks	605		
Conservative	Graham Johnson	563		
Green	Andrew Coghill	525		
Green	Peter Friel	453		
Labour Co-op	Marilynne Burbage	220		
Labour Co-op	Pat McCarthy	166		
Labour Co-op	Peter Turner	135		
CPA	Ashley Dickenson	86		
Liberal Democrats hold		Swing		
Liberal Democrats hold		Swing		
Liberal Democrats hold		Swing		

=== Carshalton South & Clockhouse ===
Carshalton South & Clockhouse (3)
Party	Candidate	Votes	%	±%
Liberal Democrats	Lisa Webster	1,966		
Liberal Democrats	Peter Chubb	1,837		
Liberal Democrats	Noor Sumun	1,697		
Conservative	Moira Butt	1,310		
Conservative	Chris Da Cruz	1,149		
Conservative	Pushpa Murthy	929		
Reform	Thomas Berry	750		
Reform	Arlene Dearlove	685		
Reform	Mark O'Callaghan	626		
Green	Chris Byrne	341		
Green	Paul McCarthy	275		
Green	Barrie Standridge	216		
Labour	Frank Cooper	163		
Labour	Aileen Neal	130		
Labour	Albert Morris	118		
Liberal Democrats gain from Conservative		Swing		
Liberal Democrats gain from Conservative		Swing		
Liberal Democrats hold		Swing		

=== Cheam ===
Cheam (3)
Party	Candidate	Votes	%	±%
Liberal Democrats	Stephen Kingdom	1,875		
Liberal Democrats	Melody Thorpe	1,794		
Liberal Democrats	Shimino Jesudas	1,761		
Conservative	Tom Drummond	1,339		
Conservative	Eric Allen	1,336		
Conservative	Tony Shields	1,295		
Reform	Ann Harris	831		
Reform	Clive Palmer	777		
Reform	Siobhan Ritson	732		
Green	Lauryn Jones	356		
Green	Rebecca Perry	336		
Green	James Nolan	289		
Labour	Alan Aylward	155		
Labour	Dave Owen	124		
Labour	Jonathan Offen	114		
Liberal Democrats gain from Conservative		Swing		
Liberal Democrats gain from Conservative		Swing		
Liberal Democrats gain from Conservative		Swing		

=== Hackbridge ===
Hackbridge (2)
Party	Candidate	Votes	%	±%
Liberal Democrats	Tom Foster	820		
Labour Co-op	Dave Tchil	726		
Liberal Democrats	Brendan Hudson	654		
Labour Co-op	Margaret Thomas	522		
Reform	Danny Davison	436		
Reform	Vijay Vashistha	383		
Green	Tanya Fernandes	278		
Green	Rubie Kelly	236		
Conservative	Alan Plant	210		
Conservative	Aephaniel Owusu-Agyemang	144		
Liberal Democrats gain from Labour		Swing		
Labour hold		Swing		

=== North Cheam ===
North Cheam (3)
Party	Candidate	Votes	%	±%
Liberal Democrats	James Appleby	1,844		
Liberal Democrats	Naveen Samrat	1,823		
Liberal Democrats	Jason Stone	1,697		
Reform	Joanna Bishop	1,112		
Reform	Natasha Fowler	1,066		
Conservative	Param Nandha	1,048		
Reform	Angus Dalgleish	1,012		
Conservative	Michael Dwyer	985		
Conservative	James McDermott-Hill	926		
Green	Chantel Campbell	420		
Green	Harry Hewing	317		
Green	Kieron Marshall	256		
Labour	Joan Bronkhorst	212		
Labour	Eleanor Jackson	190		
Labour	Ann Morrison	164		
Liberal Democrats gain from Conservative		Swing		
Liberal Democrats gain from Conservative		Swing		
Liberal Democrats gain from Conservative		Swing		

=== South Beddington & Roundshaw ===
South Beddington and Roundshaw (3)
Party	Candidate	Votes	%	±%
Liberal Democrats	Edward Joyce	1,678		
Liberal Democrats	Sunil Kumar	1,662		
Liberal Democrats	Judy Walsh	1,527		
Reform	John Fenn	925		
Reform	Dale Stacey	905		
Reform	Paolo Standerwick	865		
Conservative	Tim Green	487		
Conservative	Sinead Byrne	480		
Conservative	Anthea Winterton	431		
Green	Dave Pettit	282		
Green	Luke Richardson	267		
Green	Michael Tomlinson	226		
Labour	John Clay	207		
Labour	Beresford Caramba-Coker	174		
Labour	Mark Rogers	170		
Liberal Democrats gain from Conservative		Swing		
Liberal Democrats hold		Swing		
Liberal Democrats gain from Conservative		Swing		

=== St Helier East ===
St Helier East (2)
Party	Candidate	Votes	%	±%
Liberal Democrats	Paul Cole	906		
Liberal Democrats	Gemma Munday	894		
Reform	Dominic O'Shea	652		
Reform	Lucy O'Shea	643		
Green	Andy Acton	278		
Green	Dylan Acton	238		
Conservative	Vincentia Pratt	203		
Labour	James Bensberg	191		
Conservative	Alan Swinton	184		
Labour	Alan Tate	149		
Liberal Democrats hold		Swing		
Liberal Democrats hold		Swing		

=== St Helier West ===
St Helier West (3)
Party	Candidate	Votes	%	±%
Liberal Democrats	Joicy Joseph	1,038		
Reform	Janey Gould	1,021		
Reform	Alison Long	1,018		
Liberal Democrats	Dean Juster	1,014		
Reform	Trevor Smith	988		
Liberal Democrats	Parveen Kumar	927		
Conservative	Steve Alvarez	558		
Conservative	Wendy Clark	532		
Green	Abdul Khan	495		
Conservative	Martin Bustamante	485		
Green	Harriet Napolitano	459		
Green	Daniel Rayner	407		
Labour	Jesh Abraham	281		
Labour	Kingsley Abrams	279		
Labour	Nick Eaves	260		
Liberal Democrats gain from Conservative		Swing		
Reform gain from Conservative		Swing		
Reform gain from Conservative		Swing		

=== Stonecot ===
Stonecot (2)
Party	Candidate	Votes	%	±%
Liberal Democrats	Rob Beck	1,404		
Liberal Democrats	Cumar Sahathevan	1,222		
Reform	James King	631		
Reform	Ian Williams	584		
Conservative	Vikki Shields	459		
Conservative	Arif Syed	388		
Green	Leah Millington	250		
Green	Iffat Saboor	200		
Labour Co-op	Jane Davies	184		
Labour Co-op	Jim Hanson	129		
Liberal Democrats hold		Swing		
Liberal Democrats hold		Swing		

=== Sutton Central ===
Sutton Central (3)
Party	Candidate	Votes	%	±%
Liberal Democrats	Richard Choi	1,745		
Liberal Democrats	Ed Parsley	1,537		
Liberal Democrats	Cryss Mennaceur	1,471		
Green	Helen John	840		
Green	Doug Shaw	655		
Green	Hannah White	648		
Reform	Rob Ewing	587		
Reform	Stewart Wood	565		
Reform	Haoyu Zhang	513		
Conservative	Jeanne Hornshaw	334		
Labour	Chantelle Donkor	290		
Conservative	Barry Russell	288		
Conservative	Paul Whitcher	288		
Labour	Paul Harrison	245		
Labour	Kerrie Peek	244		
Liberal Democrats hold		Swing		
Liberal Democrats hold		Swing		
Liberal Democrats hold		Swing		

=== Sutton North ===
Sutton North (3)
Party	Candidate	Votes	%	±%
Liberal Democrats	Sam Cumber	1,846		
Liberal Democrats	Vanessa McCain	1,761		
Liberal Democrats	Yusuf Abd El-Razzak	1,640		
Reform	Bob Lampard	856		
Reform	Edward Mills	796		
Reform	Bill Main-Ian	773		
Conservative	Blake Purchase	648		
Conservative	Tony Sphikas	579		
Conservative	Aamir Haroon	544		
Green	Genevieve White	447		
Green	Toby McGuinness	420		
Green	Wesley Witt	327		
Labour	Kehinde Akintunde	262		
Labour	Lyndon Edwards	257		
Labour	Mark Simmonds	244		
Liberal Democrats hold		Swing		
Liberal Democrats hold		Swing		
Liberal Democrats gain from Conservative		Swing		

=== Sutton South ===
Sutton South (3)
Party	Candidate	Votes	%	±%
Liberal Democrats	Richard Clifton	2,004		
Liberal Democrats	Trish Fivey	1,922		
Liberal Democrats	Asif Hirani	1,661		
Conservative	Manish Bhalla	861		
Conservative	Alexander Coker	776		
Conservative	Michael Mortimore	767		
Reform	Ian Drury	562		
Reform	Pamela Peller	548		
Reform	Taaha Ahmed	498		
Green	Amy Bryce	439		
Green	Fraser Brough	390		
Green	Ross Jones	343		
Labour	Sandra Buck	246		
Labour	Tessa Cornell	224		
Labour	Graham Terrell	194		
Liberal Democrats hold		Swing		
Liberal Democrats hold		Swing		
Liberal Democrats hold		Swing		

=== Sutton West & East Cheam ===
Sutton West & East Cheam (3)
Party	Candidate	Votes	%	±%
Liberal Democrats	Louise Phelan	2,063		
Liberal Democrats	Christopher Woolmer	1,967		
Liberal Democrats	Qasim Esak	1,887		
Reform	Dan Lawes	701		
Reform	Alison Sinclair	694		
Reform	Harry Robinson	688		
Conservative	Sarah Hornshaw	631		
Conservative	Stephen Read	576		
Conservative	Natkunam Wimalendran	493		
Green	James Beckley	413		
Green	Firat Bas	399		
Green	James Kelly	397		
Labour	Victoria Barlow	298		
Labour	Michael McMahon	191		
Labour	Peter Queally	170		
Liberal Democrats hold		Swing		
Liberal Democrats hold		Swing		
Liberal Democrats hold		Swing		

=== The Wrythe ===
The Wrythe (3)
Party	Candidate	Votes	%	±%
Liberal Democrats	Colin Stears	1,633		
Liberal Democrats	Rukhsar Askari	1,593		
Liberal Democrats	Ian Simpson	1,593		
Reform	Ethan Smith	944		
Reform	Rohit Kaila	910		
Reform	Jack Vallins	901		
Conservative	Terry Woods	462		
Green	Peter Greig	448		
Conservative	Debra Russell	446		
Green	Jack Holdawanski	386		
Conservative	Rahul Yadav	371		
Green	Robert Walker	368		
Labour	Michael Cawley	236		
Labour	David Grant	228		
Labour	Maria Qanita	217		
Independent	Patrick Ogbonna	130		
Liberal Democrats hold		Swing		
Liberal Democrats hold		Swing		
Liberal Democrats hold		Swing		

=== Wallington North ===
Wallington North (3)
Party	Candidate	Votes	%	±%
Liberal Democrats	Sunita Gordon	1,976		
Liberal Democrats	Aaron Goater	1,910		
Liberal Democrats	Barry Lewis	1,842		
Reform	Peter Cox	957		
Reform	Jason Champaneri	925		
Reform	Leo Rose	865		
Green	Maeve Tomlinson	469		
Conservative	Joseph D'Costa	449		
Green	John Keys	445		
Conservative	Jack Richardson	437		
Green	Samia Tossio	402		
Conservative	Barbara Woods	402		
Labour	Tim Featherstone-Griffin	263		
Labour	Judith Hawkins	242		
Labour	Mary Towler	228		
Independent	Celeste Narywonczyk	110		
Liberal Democrats hold		Swing		
Liberal Democrats hold		Swing		
Liberal Democrats hold		Swing		

=== Wallington South ===
Wallington South (3)
Party	Candidate	Votes	%	±%
Liberal Democrats	Jayne McCoy	1,990		
Liberal Democrats	Sam Martin	1,897		
Liberal Democrats	Muhammad Sadiq	1,785		
Reform	Heather Mann	705		
Reform	David Sykes	704		
Reform	David Taffurelli	651		
Green	Eliot Carroll	553		
Conservative	Christopher Wortley	527		
Conservative	Hilary Wortley	488		
Conservative	Jim Simms	483		
Green	Chris Donnelly	468		
Green	Cat Ebongalame	467		
Labour	John Ashton	248		
Labour	Teresa Ayoub	212		
Labour	Jennifer Vidler	171		
Liberal Democrats hold		Swing		
Liberal Democrats hold		Swing		
Liberal Democrats hold		Swing		

=== Worcester Park North ===
Worcester Park North (2)
Party	Candidate	Votes	%	±%
Liberal Democrats	Joanna Elgarf	1,262		
Liberal Democrats	Israel Owoade	1,059		
Conservative	Radley Cunliffe	618		
Conservative	Jo Martin	583		
Reform	Deborah Scully	561		
Reform	Moira Standerwick	530		
Green	Kirsty Nelson	356		
Green	Julie Stamford	293		
Labour	John Flowers	199		
Labour	Natalie Wright	169		
Liberal Democrats gain from Conservative		Swing		
Liberal Democrats gain from Conservative		Swing		

=== Worcester Park South ===
Worcester Park South (2)
Party	Candidate	Votes	%	±%
Liberal Democrats	Jenna Hartley-Smith	1,469		
Liberal Democrats	Luni Sabharwal	1,318		
Reform	Karin Burke	699		
Reform	Judy Urmossy	621		
Conservative	Martina Allen	639		
Conservative	Peter Geiringer	577		
Green	Anna Mora	231		
Green	Ganesh Sathyamoorthy	223		
Labour	Jessica Parker	115		
Labour	George Gallant	112		
Liberal Democrats gain from Conservative		Swing		
Liberal Democrats gain from Conservative		Swing		
