= 2002 Sutton London Borough Council election =

2002 local election in England

2002 Sutton London Borough Council Election
- 2 May 2002

All 54 seats up for election to Sutton London Borough Council 28 seats needed for a majority
- Registered: 133,044
- Turnout: 48,236, 36.26% (▲0.91)

	First party	Second party	Third party
Leader	Graham N. Tope	Unknown	Unknown
Party	Liberal Democrats	Conservative	Labour
Leader since	1986	Unknown	Unknown
Leader's seat	Sutton Central	Unknown	Unknown
Last election	46 seats, 51.81%	5 seats, 28.21%	5 seats, 17.87%
Seats before	46	5	5
Seats won	43	8	3
Seat change	▼3	▲3	▼2
Popular vote	68,842	49,896	16,516
Percentage	49.80%	36.09%	11.95%
Swing	▼2.01	▲7.88	▼5.92
- Map of the Sutton Election results. Yellow-Liberal Democrat. Red-Labour Party, Blue-Conservative Party
Council control before election
.
Liberal Democrats
Council control after election
Liberal Democrats

The 2002 Sutton London Borough Council election was a local election for the representation of the Sutton district in London. It was a part of the 2002 London local elections. The Liberal Democrats won 49.1% of the vote in the district which was their most successful district of that election, and the only district which they retained control of since the previous 1998 London local elections. Borough turnout was approximately 36.3%, which was similar to the previous election in 1998.

These elections were the first held with the new ward boundaries which decreased the total number of Councillors by 2, from 56 to 54.

== Background ==
=== Council Composition ===
In between this election and the 1998 election there a total of 2 by-elections to replaced councillors who resigned their seats. Despite this, neither of these seats changed parties during their respective by-elections.

Aside from this, there were no changes to the council, which meant the composition just before the election was as follows:

↓
5	46	5
Labour	Lib Dem	Conservative

=== Redistricting ===
==== Wards Created ====
- Carshalton South and Clockhouse (3)
- Nonsuch (3)
- Stonecot (3)
- Sutton North (3)
- The Wrythe (3)

==== Wards Eliminated ====
- Carshalton Beeches (3)
- Carshalton North (2)
- Clockhouse (1)
- Rosehill (2)
- Sutton Common (3)
- Sutton East (3)
- Woodcote (1)
- Wrythe Green (2)

==== Wards Merged ====
- Cheam (3) - merged from Cheam South (2), Cheam West (2) and North Cheam (2) wards
- St Helier (3) - merged from St Helier North (3) and St Helier South (2) wards
- Worcester Park (3) - merged from Worcester Park North (3) and Worcester Park South (2) wards

==== Wards Expanded ====
- Belmont - Increased from 2 seats to 3.
- Carshalton Central - Increased from 2 seats to 3.
- Sutton Central - Increased from 2 seats to 3.
- Sutton West - Increased from 2 seats to 3.
- Wandle Valley - Increased from 2 seats to 3.

== Election Results ==
2002 Sutton London Borough Council local elections
Party	Seats	Gains	Losses	Net gain/loss	Seats %	Votes %	Votes	+/−
Liberal Democrats	43	23	26	▼3	79.63	49.80	68,842	▼2.01
Conservative	8	6	3	▲3	14.81	36.09	49,896	▲7.88
Labour	3	3	5	▼2	5.56	11.95	16,516	▼5.92
Green	0	0	0	Steady	0.00	2.10	2,904	▲0.19
Monster Raving Loony	0	0	0	Steady	0.00	0.06	89	New
Total	54						138,247	

After the election, the composition of the council was as follows:

↓
3	43	8
Labour	Lib Dem	Conservative

== Ward Results ==
(*) - Indicates an incumbent candidate

(†) - Indicates an incumbent candidate standing in a different ward

=== Beddington North ===
Beddington North (3)
Party	Candidate	Votes	%	±%
Liberal Democrats	John Keys^{†} (Note: Keys was a sitting councillor representing the Wallington North ward)	1,168	50.19	▼6.24
Liberal Democrats	John Leach*	1,143		
Liberal Democrats	Joan Hartfield	1,116		
Conservative	Howard Bowles	871	37.40	▼10.15
Conservative	Spencer Franks	848		
Conservative	Lorraine Snowball	835		
Labour	Geoffrey Collier	307	12.40	▼0.59
Labour	Margaret Collier	279		
Labour	Susan Theobald	261		
Registered electors		7,499		▼2,414
Turnout		2,423	32.31	▼1.16
Rejected ballots		3	0.12	▼0.06
Liberal Democrats win (new boundaries)				
Liberal Democrats win (new boundaries)				
Liberal Democrats win (new seat)				

=== Beddington South ===
Beddington South (3)
Party	Candidate	Votes	%	±%
Liberal Democrats	Catriona Ison	1,343	49.27	▼4.38
Liberal Democrats	Colleen Saunders*	1,300		
Liberal Democrats	Ferris Moussa* (Note: Moussa was elected in a by-election triggered by the resignation of Cllr Richard Aitken in 2001)	1,299		
Conservative	Graham Whitham	1,137	42.17	▲21.48
Conservative	Moira Butt	1,133		
Conservative	Laura Requena	1,104		
Labour	Hayley Bond	249	8.56	▼17.09
Labour	Joyce Smith^{†} (Note: Smith was a sitting councillor representing the former St Helier North ward)	219		
Labour	Marley Renuka	217		
Registered electors		7,039		▲607
Turnout		2,744	38.98	▼9.07
Rejected ballots		5	0.18	▲0.02
Liberal Democrats win (new boundaries)				
Liberal Democrats win (new boundaries)				
Liberal Democrats win (new boundaries)				

=== Belmont ===
Belmont (3)
Party	Candidate	Votes	%	±%
Conservative	David Pickles	1,708	53.28	▲15.69
Conservative	Peter Geiringer^{†} (Note: Geiringer was a sitting councillor representing the Sutton South ward)	1,689		
Conservative	Pamela Picknett	1,628		
Liberal Democrats	Anthony Wallace*	1,312	41.37	▼12.85
Liberal Democrats	Wendy Mathys	1,303		
Liberal Democrats	Mahmood Bhatti	1,287		
Labour	Philip Bassett	182	5.35	▲0.27
Labour	Geoffrey Brennan	164		
Labour	Stephen Blears	159		
Registered electors		7,481		▲1,012
Turnout		3,254	43.50	▲3.40
Rejected ballots		6	0.18	▲0.06
Conservative win (new boundaries)				
Conservative win (new boundaries)				
Conservative win (new seat)				

=== Carshalton Central ===
Carshalton Central (3)
Party	Candidate	Votes	%	±%
Liberal Democrats	Angela Baughan*	1,502	52.12	▲0.22
Liberal Democrats	Michael Cooper^{†} (Note: Cooper was a sitting councillor representing the Carshalton North ward)	1,446		
Liberal Democrats	Hamish Pollock	1,391		
Conservative	Peter Cattermole	903	31.62	▲3.59
Conservative	Owen Hanson	868		
Conservative	Nigel Petre	861		
Labour	David Davis	262	9.03	▼2.82
Labour	John Young	246		
Labour	Sam Towler	244		
Green	Susan Riddlestone	213	7.23	▼0.99
Green	Simon Dixon	209		
Green	Neil Hornsby	180		
Registered electors		7,321		▲2,488
Turnout		2,879	39.33	▼0.13
Rejected ballots		6	0.21	▼0.21
Liberal Democrats win (new boundaries)				
Liberal Democrats win (new boundaries)				
Liberal Democrats win (new seat)				

=== Carshalton South and Clockhouse ===
Carshalton South and Clockhouse (3)
Party	Candidate	Votes	%	±%
Liberal Democrats	Jason Reynolds	1,498	45.07	New
Liberal Democrats	Derek Yeo	1,477		
Liberal Democrats	Lal Hussain	1,476		
Conservative	John Kennedy	1,464	42.80	New
Conservative	Robert Gill	1,415		
Conservative	Francis Requena	1,348		
Labour Co-op	Marilynne Burbage	244	7.09	New
Labour Co-op	Claire Shearer	244		
Labour Co-op	Kevin Willsher	212		
Green	Nicholas Greaves	171	5.04	New
Green	Peter Rudkin	161		
Registered electors		7,062		New
Turnout		3,325	47.08	New
Rejected ballots		5	0.15	New
Liberal Democrats win (new seat)				
Liberal Democrats win (new seat)				
Liberal Democrats win (new seat)				

=== Cheam ===
Cheam (3)
Party	Candidate	Votes	%	±%
Conservative	Eleanor Pinfold	1,741	50.39	New
Conservative	Edward Trevor^{†} (Note: Trevor was a sitting councillor representing the former Cheam South ward)	1,708		
Conservative	Syed Zaidi	1,634		
Liberal Democrats	Robert Gleeson^{†} (Note: Gleeson was a sitting councillor representing the former Cheam West ward)	1,603	45.95	New
Liberal Democrats	Philip Hewitt^{†} (Note: Hewitt was a sitting councillor representing the Carshalton North ward)	1,542		
Liberal Democrats	Ian Ruxton^{†} (Note: Ruxton was a sitting councillor representing the former Worcester Park North ward)	1,490		
Labour	David Jarman	143	3.66	New
Labour	Helen Jones	118		
Labour	Marian Ponto	108		
Registered electors		7,631		New
Turnout		3,478	45.58	New
Rejected ballots		0	0.00	New
Conservative win (new seat)				
Conservative win (new seat)				
Conservative win (new seat)				

=== Nonsuch ===
Nonsuch (3)
Party	Candidate	Votes	%	±%
Liberal Democrats	Wendy Bradley^{†} (Note: Bradley was a sitting councillor representing the Worcester Park South ward)	1,542	53.47	New
Liberal Democrats	Roger Roberts^{†} (Note: Roberts was a sitting councillor representing the former Worcester Park South ward)	1,496		
Liberal Democrats	Lynette Gleeson^{†} (Note: Gleeson was a sitting councillor representing the former Cheam West ward)	1,490		
Conservative	John Boyce	1,188	40.85	New
Conservative	Marilyn Cappiello	1,142		
Conservative	Ian Pendlington	1,129		
Labour	David Hosking	181	5.68	New
Labour	Joan Jarman	159		
Labour	Cyril Salmon	141		
Registered electors		7,641		New
Turnout		2,931	38.36	New
Rejected ballots		1	0.03	New
Liberal Democrats win (new seat)				
Liberal Democrats win (new seat)				
Liberal Democrats win (new seat)				

=== St. Helier ===
St Helier (3)
Party	Candidate	Votes	%	±%
Labour	Charles Mansell^{†} (Note: Mansell was a sitting councillor representing the former St Helier South ward)	878	49.11	New
Labour	Joseph Magee	874		
Labour	Andrew Theobald^{†} (Note: Theobald was a sitting councillor representing the former St Helier North ward)	797		
Liberal Democrats	Paulus Hienkens	516	28.56	New
Liberal Democrats	Claire Pickering	497		
Liberal Democrats	Barry Reed	469		
Conservative	Brian Keynes	390	22.33	New
Conservative	Charles Manton	388		
Conservative	Eric Pillinger	381		
Registered electors		7,479		New
Turnout		1,870	25.00	New
Rejected ballots		10	0.53	New
Labour win (new seat)				
Labour win (new seat)				
Labour win (new seat)				

=== Stonecot ===
Stonecot (3)
Party	Candidate	Votes	%	±%
Liberal Democrats	Anthony Brett Young	1,623	64.24	New
Liberal Democrats	Lesley O'Connell^{†} (Note: O'Connell and Gallop were sitting councillors representing the former Sutton Common ward)	1,597		
Liberal Democrats	Anna-Nicolette Gallop^{†}	1,579		
Conservative	Christine Barnett	710	28.18	New
Conservative	Christopher Furey	706		
Conservative	Christine Hicks	689		
Labour	Dennis Baldry	207	7.58	New
Labour	David Fleming	184		
Labour	David Towler	175		
Registered electors		7,695		New
Turnout		2,588	33.63	New
Rejected ballots		5	0.19	New
Liberal Democrats win (new seat)				
Liberal Democrats win (new seat)				
Liberal Democrats win (new seat)				

=== Sutton Central ===
Sutton Central (3)
Party	Candidate	Votes	%	±%
Liberal Democrats	John Brennan*	1,010	41.93	▼26.58
Liberal Democrats	Janet Lowne^{†} (Note: Lowne was a sitting councillor representing the former Sutton East ward)	983		
Liberal Democrats	Graham Tope*	948		
Labour	Kathleen Allen	751	30.08	▲14.57
Labour	Gale Blears	695		
Labour	John Morgan^{†} (Note: Morgan was a sitting councillor representing the former St Helier North ward)	664		
Conservative	Stewart England	477	19.78	▲3.80
Conservative	Annabel Wells	460		
Conservative	Lynne Isaby	450		
Green	Margaret Williams	192	8.21	New
Registered electors		7,267		▲2,319
Turnout		2,333	32.10	▲0.67
Rejected ballots		7	0.30	▼0.09
Liberal Democrats win (new boundaries)				
Liberal Democrats win (new boundaries)				
Liberal Democrats win (new seat)				

=== Sutton North ===
Sutton North (3)
Party	Candidate	Votes	%	±%
Liberal Democrats	Donald Brims^{†} (Note: Brims was a sitting councillor representing the former Sutton East ward)	1,419	60.23	New
Liberal Democrats	Ruth Dombey	1,416		
Liberal Democrats	Marlene Heron	1,388		
Conservative	Clifford Carter	721	30.11	New
Conservative	John Hutchinson	696		
Conservative	Peter North	694		
Labour	John Brown	239	9.66	New
Labour	Stephen Morton	227		
Labour	Aisha Latif	211		
Registered electors		7,320		New
Turnout		2,465	33.67	New
Rejected ballots		6	0.24	New
Liberal Democrats win (new seat)				
Liberal Democrats win (new seat)				
Liberal Democrats win (new seat)				

=== Sutton South ===
Sutton South (3)
Party	Candidate	Votes	%	±%
Conservative	Tony Shields	1,170	44.39	▲0.35
Liberal Democrats	Nasser Butt	1,157	42.65	▼0.54
Conservative	Paul Newman	1,154		
Conservative	Graham Jarvis	1,152		
Liberal Democrats	Colin Stears	1,109		
Liberal Democrats	Wolfgang Kuhn	1,074		
Labour	Paul Harrison	191	6.98	▼1.71
Labour	Patricia Simons	186		
Green	Simon Honey	176	5.98	▲1.91
Labour	John Cooper	170		
Green	Maureen Peglar	136		
Registered electors		6,887		▼881
Turnout		2,634	38.25	▲2.48
Rejected ballots		6	0.23	▼0.09
Conservative win (new boundaries)				
Liberal Democrats win (new boundaries)				
Conservative win (new boundaries)				

=== Sutton West ===
Sutton West (3)
Party	Candidate	Votes	%	±%
Liberal Democrats	Joan Crowhurst*	1,439	55.33	▼4.49
Liberal Democrats	Myfawny Wallace*	1,379		
Liberal Democrats	Jerome Gerard	1,344		
Conservative	Jeannette Bird	861	33.91	▲9.10
Conservative	Andrew Drummond	845		
Conservative	David Park^{†} (Note: Park was a sitting councillor representing the former Cheam South ward. He was elected in a by-election triggered by the resignation of Cllr Sarah Wallace in 1999)	845		
Labour	Sarah Banks	164	5.84	▼3.95
Labour	Ronald Williams	143		
Green	Eric Hickson	138	4.92	▼0.67
Labour	Shawn Buck	132		
Green	Jose Hickson	125		
Green	Peter Hickson	107		
Registered electors		7,578		▲3,249
Turnout		2,579	34.03	▼2.79
Rejected ballots		1	0.04	▼0.15
Liberal Democrats win (new boundaries)				
Liberal Democrats win (new boundaries)				
Liberal Democrats win (new seat)				

=== The Wrythe ===
The Wrythe (3)
Party	Candidate	Votes	%	±%
Liberal Democrats	Susan Stears^{†} (Note: Stears and Siggins were both sitting councillors representing the former Wrythe Green ward)	1,176	52.93	New
Liberal Democrats	Sheila Siggins^{†}	1,142		
Liberal Democrats	Roger Thistle^{†} (Note: Thistle was a sitting councillor representing the Clockhouse ward)	1,103		
Conservative	Robert Creece	544	25.07	New
Conservative	Christopher Wortley	540		
Conservative	Marion Williams	536		
Labour	Richard Collier	377	16.96	New
Labour	Anthony Thorpe	365		
Labour	Bodipala Wijeyesinghe	354		
Green	Karin Andrews	118	5.04	New
Green	William Fuller	99		
Registered electors		7,573		New
Turnout		2,348	31.00	New
Rejected ballots		6	0.26	New
Liberal Democrats win (new seat)				
Liberal Democrats win (new seat)				
Liberal Democrats win (new seat)				

=== Wallington North ===
Wallington North (3)
Party	Candidate	Votes	%	±%
Liberal Democrats	John Dodwell*	1,128	43.46	▼6.35
Liberal Democrats	Joan McMullen	1,073		
Liberal Democrats	Robert Marvelly*	1,046		
Conservative	Desmond Bowles	961	37.69	▲10.46
Conservative	Mark Franks	940		
Conservative	Dee Hyatt	915		
Labour	Margaret Cooper	333	12.42	▼4.85
Labour	John Joyce	305		
Labour	Peter Turner	290		
Green	Penelope Mouncey	181	6.43	▲0.74
Green	Philip Mouncey	139		
Registered electors		7,453		▼30
Turnout		2,555	34.28	▲1.41
Rejected ballots		8	0.31	▼0.02
Liberal Democrats win (new boundaries)				
Liberal Democrats win (new boundaries)				
Liberal Democrats win (new boundaries)				

=== Wallington South ===
Wallington South (3)
Party	Candidate	Votes	%	±%
Liberal Democrats	Richard Bailey*	1,465	48.20	▼2.50
Liberal Democrats	Colin Hall*	1,427		
Liberal Democrats	Robert Landeryou	1,411		
Conservative	Daniel Lewis	1,074	35.21	▲3.83
Conservative	Paul Scully	1,065		
Conservative	Peter Wootten	1,004		
Labour	Mary Ryan	232	7.01	▼3.65
Labour	Clive Poge	211		
Green	Malin Andrews	207	6.59	▲2.04
Green	Amanda Lewis	185		
Labour	Paul Wingrove	183		
Monster Raving Loony	Danny Blue	89	2.99	New
Registered electors		7,367		▲273
Turnout		2,931	39.79	▲1.49
Rejected ballots		5	0.17	▼0.01
Liberal Democrats win (new boundaries)				
Liberal Democrats win (new boundaries)				
Liberal Democrats win (new boundaries)				

=== Wandle Valley ===
Wandle Valley (3)
Party	Candidate	Votes	%	±%
Liberal Democrats	Sheila Andrews*	1,320	54.45	▲3.98
Liberal Democrats	Margaret Court*	1,296		
Liberal Democrats	Patrick Kane	1,271		
Labour	Stephen Lloyd^{†} (Note: Lloyd was a sitting councillor representing the former St Helier South ward)	743	30.53	▼8.42
Labour	John Weir	732		
Labour	Visvanathan Sriganeshakumar	704		
Conservative	Louise Heate	379	15.02	▲4.44
Conservative	Patrick Jacques	351		
Conservative	Hilary Wortley	342		
Registered electors		7,332		▲2,403
Turnout		2,530	34.51	▲2.07
Rejected ballots		6	0.24	
Liberal Democrats win (new boundaries)				
Liberal Democrats win (new boundaries)				
Liberal Democrats win (new seat)				

=== Worcester Park ===
Worcester Park (3)
Party	Candidate	Votes	%	±%
Liberal Democrats	Julian Freeman^{†} (Note: Freeman was a sitting councillor representing the former North Cheam ward)	1,327	53.55	New
Liberal Democrats	Leslie Coman^{†} (Note: Coman was a sitting councillor representing the former Worcester Park North (ward))	1,274		
Liberal Democrats	Peter Overy^{†} (Note: Overy was a sitting councillor representing the former Rosehill ward)	1,212		
Conservative	Beryl Moxon	725	29.52	New
Conservative	Glenys Longhurst	699		
Conservative	Julie Park	678		
Labour	John Evers	249	9.89	New
Labour	Graham Hosking	229		
Labour	Hilary Hosking	226		
Green	Christopher Holmes	167	7.04	New
Registered electors		7,419		New
Turnout		2,369	31.93	New
Rejected ballots		3	0.13	New
Liberal Democrats win (new seat)				
Liberal Democrats win (new seat)				
Liberal Democrats win (new seat)				
