= 1990 Sutton London Borough Council election =

1990 local election in England

← 1986	3 May 1990	1994 →

All 56 seats up for election to Sutton London Borough Council 29 seats needed for a majority
- Registered: 125,474
- Turnout: 69,572, 55.45%
	First party	Second party	Third party
Leader	Graham Tope	Unknown	Unknown
Party	Liberal Democrats	Conservative	Labour
Leader since	1986	Unknown	Unknown
Leader's seat	Sutton Central	Unknown	Unknown
Seats before	29	21	6
Seats won	31	18	7
Seat change	▲2	▼3	▲1
Popular vote	65,303	58,723	27,402
Percentage	42.05%	37.81%	17.65%
Council control before election
Liberal Democrats
Council control after election
Liberal Democrats

The 1990 Sutton Council election took place on 3 May 1990 to elect members of Sutton London Borough Council in London, England. The whole council was up for election and the Liberal Democrats kept overall control of the council.

== Election result ==
1990 Sutton London Borough Council elections
Party	Seats	Gains	Losses	Net gain/loss	Seats %	Votes %	Votes	+/−
Liberal Democrats	31	3	1	▲2	55.4	42.05	65,303	
Conservative	18	0	3	▼3	32.1	37.81	58,723	
Labour	7	1	0	▲1	12.5	17.65	27,402	
Green	0	0	0	Steady	0.0	1.73	2,692	
SDP	0	0	0	Steady	0.0	0.48	740	
Raving Loony Green Giant	0	0	0	Steady	0.0	0.28	435	
Total	56						155,295	

== Ward results ==
(*) - Indicates an incumbent candidate

=== Beddington North ===
Beddington North (2)
Party	Candidate	Votes	%
Liberal Democrats	Joan A. Dutton*	1,495	50.07
Liberal Democrats	Daphne A. Gvozdenovic	1,386	
Conservative	Moira J. Butt	1,066	36.48
Conservative	Martin Riley	1,033	
Labour	John Bray	268	8.90
Labour	Michael J. Radburn	244	
Green	Peter T. Rudkin	131	4.55
Registered electors		4,701	
Turnout		2,899	61.67
Rejected ballots		0	0.00
Liberal Democrats hold			
Liberal Democrats hold			

=== Beddington South ===
Beddington South (3)
Party	Candidate	Votes	%
Liberal Democrats	Colleen Saunders*	1,539	43.16
Liberal Democrats	Robert J. Irving	1,453	
Liberal Democrats	Alan R. Chewter	1,414	
Conservative	Peter Coulson	942	27.23
Labour	Philip J. Bassett	940	25.91
Conservative	John E. Ford	923	
Conservative	George A. Godyn	916	
Labour	Nigel P. Bond	896	
Labour	Violet J. Scotter	811	
Raving Loony Green Giant	Ian Butcher	126	3.70
Registered electors		6,558	
Turnout		3,547	54.09
Rejected ballots		6	0.17
Liberal Democrats hold			
Liberal Democrats hold			
Liberal Democrats hold			

=== Belmont ===
Belmont (2)
Party	Candidate	Votes	%
Conservative	Lesley D. Barber*	1,496	58.55
Conservative	Joyce K.M. Bowley*	1,483	
Liberal Democrats	Gundred E. Heap	636	24.09
Liberal Democrats	Lesley J. Snelling	589	
Labour	David Banks	300	11.04
Labour	John A. Clay	261	
Green	James Duffy	161	6.33
Registered electors		5,113	
Turnout		2,574	50.34
Rejected ballots		3	0.12
Conservative hold			
Conservative hold			

=== Carshalton Beeches ===
Carshalton Beeches (3)
Party	Candidate	Votes	%
Conservative	Mavis Peart*	1,935	48.40
Conservative	Edward J. Crowley*	1,933	
Conservative	Keith J. Martin*	1,861	
Liberal Democrats	Laurence C. Smith	996	24.76
Liberal Democrats	John A. Phillimore	972	
Liberal Democrats	Gary M. Miles	963	
Labour	Douglas J. Banks	457	10.39
Labour	David N. Murray	401	
Labour	Patrick O'Keeffe	373	
SDP	Michael G. Lyon	351	8.90
Green	Nick McDonagh-Greaves	298	7.55
Registered electors		6,664	
Turnout		3,703	55.57
Rejected ballots		2	0.05
Conservative hold			
Conservative hold			
Conservative hold			

=== Carshalton Central ===
Carshalton Central (2)
Party	Candidate	Votes	%
Liberal Democrats	Hamish J.C. Pollock	1,302	46.43
Liberal Democrats	Roger G.A. Thistle	1,270	
Conservative	Peter N. Baggott*	1,094	38.63
Conservative	Michael L. Gosling	1,046	
Labour	Pamela L. Selous Hodges	245	8.77
Labour	Dawn R. Lever	240	
Green	Susan E. Riddlestone	156	5.56
Green	Gay H. McDonagh-Greaves	151	
Raving Loony Green Giant	Neil A. Kearns	17	0.61
Registered electors		4,675	
Turnout		2,818	60.28
Rejected ballots		4	0.14
Liberal Democrats hold			
Liberal Democrats gain from Conservative			

=== Carshalton North ===
Carshalton North (2)
Party	Candidate	Votes	%
Liberal Democrats	Thomase E. Dutton*	1,632	55.36
Liberal Democrats	Michael A. Cooper*	1,612	
Conservative	Teresa Munro	866	29.52
Conservative	Harry Rogers	863	
Labour	Sarah Weir	338	10.85
Labour	Kevin J. Willsher	298	
Green	Neil J. Hornsby	125	4.27
Registered electors		5,143	
Turnout		2,988	58.10
Rejected ballots		3	0.10
Liberal Democrats hold			
Liberal Democrats hold			

=== Cheam South ===
Cheam South (2)
Party	Candidate	Votes	%
Conservative	Lynette G. Ranson*	1,771	71.46
Conservative	Edward G. Trevor*	1,705	
Liberal Democrats	Jean F. Lewis	428	17.31
Liberal Democrats	Patricia J. Roberts	414	
Green	Peter F. Ticher	152	6.25
Labour	David Jarman	129	4.98
Labour	Peter J. Henshall	112	
Registered electors		4,372	
Turnout		2,446	55.95
Rejected ballots		1	0.04
Conservative hold			
Conservative hold			

=== Cheam West ===
Cheam West (2)
Party	Candidate	Votes	%
Liberal Democrats	Elizabeth M. Sharp	1,237	46.02
Liberal Democrats	Frank W. Sharp	1,181	
Conservative	Keith R. Dodwell	1,169	44.39
Conservative	Christopher Heaton-Harris	1,162	
Labour	Christopher J. Dixon	183	6.17
Labour	Herbert J. Smith	140	
Green	Peter H. Hickson	90	3.43
Registered electors		4,296	
Turnout		2,673	62.22
Rejected ballots		0	0.00
Liberal Democrats gain from Conservative			
Liberal Democrats gain from Conservative			

=== Clockhouse ===
Clockhouse (1)
Party	Candidate	Votes	%
Conservative	Malcolm P. Garner*	559	55.57
Liberal Democrats	Catherine R. Brown	236	23.46
Labour	Patrick R. Imrie	211	20.97
Registered electors		1,560	
Turnout		1,006	64.49
Rejected ballots		0	0.00
Conservative hold			

=== North Cheam ===
North Cheam (2)
Party	Candidate	Votes	%
Liberal Democrats	Carol M. Campbell	1,728	62.40
Liberal Democrats	Valerie R. Price*	1,723	
Conservative	Clifford C.G. Carter	840	29.47
Conservative	Terence L. Reddin	789	
Labour	Patricia M. Brown	237	8.13
Labour	Mark R. Green	213	
Registered electors		4,806	
Turnout		2,867	59.65
Rejected ballots		1	0.04
Liberal Democrats hold			
Liberal Democrats hold			

=== Rosehill ===
Rosehill (2)
Party	Candidate	Votes	%
Liberal Democrats	Paul K. Burstow*	1,555	59.98
Liberal Democrats	Stephen J. Penneck*	1,553	
Conservative	Denis Kerslake	822	30.99
Conservative	Lorna M.A. Rayne	783	
Labour	John M. Bloom	252	
Labour	Maurice M. Slattery	216	9.03
Registered electors		4,411	
Turnout		2,679	60.73
Rejected ballots		1	0.04
Liberal Democrats hold			
Liberal Democrats hold			

=== St Helier North ===
St Helier North (3)
Party	Candidate	Votes	%
Labour	Albert G.A. Dyson*	1,634	58.40
Labour	Patrick B. Kane*	1,613	
Labour	Donald B. Hopkins*	1,558	
Liberal Democrats	Gillian M. Brennan	669	22.79
Liberal Democrats	Nicholas Cull	616	
Liberal Democrats	Stella M. Franklin	589	
Conservative	Hilda M. Harding	475	16.77
Conservative	Brian W.M. Keynes	461	
Conservative	Alison J. Pike	444	
Raving Loony Green Giant	Colin O'B. Ross	56	2.04
Registered electors		6,230	
Turnout		2,938	47.16
Rejected ballots		4	0.14
Labour hold			
Labour hold			
Labour hold			

=== St Helier South ===
St Helier South (2)
Party	Candidate	Votes	%
Labour	Charles J. Mansell*	1,137	63.66
Labour	John A.S. Weir*	1,053	
Liberal Democrats	Barry F. Reed	358	20.06
Liberal Democrats	Catherine M. Reed	331	
Conservative	Jeffrey E. Gregory	232	12.97
Conservative	Angela M. Roberts	213	
Raving Loony Green Giant	Jason P. Bamford	57	3.31
Registered electors		3,854	
Turnout		1,795	46.57
Rejected ballots		6	0.33
Labour hold			
Labour hold			

=== Sutton Central ===
Sutton Central (2)
Party	Candidate	Votes	%
Liberal Democrats	Keith J.S.M. Pitkin	1,423	59.06
Liberal Democrats	Graham N. Tope*	1,404	
Conservative	Keith R. Taylor	575	23.81
Conservative	Edward V. New	564	
Labour	Denise E. Dixon	357	14.83
Labour	Peter C. Randall	353	
Raving Loony Green Giant	Richard Bick	55	2.30
Registered electors		4,835	
Turnout		2,526	52.24
Rejected ballots		4	0.16
Liberal Democrats hold			
Liberal Democrats hold			

=== Sutton Common ===
Sutton Common (2)
Party	Candidate	Votes	%
Liberal Democrats	Lesley F. O'Connell*	1,669	65.06
Liberal Democrats	Richard F. Broadbent	1,653	
Conservative	Jayne Y. Carlow	682	26.52
Conservative	Jessica M. Dodwell	671	
Labour	Anthony J. Barnes	243	8.42
Labour	Donald M. Selous Hodges	186	
Registered electors		4,390	
Turnout		2,637	60.07
Rejected ballots		1	0.04
Liberal Democrats hold			
Liberal Democrats hold			

=== Sutton East ===
Sutton East (3)
Party	Candidate	Votes	%
Liberal Democrats	John F. Brennan*	1,440	49.54
Liberal Democrats	Neil Frater*	1,402	
Liberal Democrats	Terry A. Woods*	1,368	
Conservative	Michael P. Adams	880	29.77
Conservative	Peter N. Fowler	825	
Conservative	Gary Eales	823	
Labour	Antony C. Dyson	614	20.69
Labour	Robert Gill	575	
Labour	Andrew C. Theobald	570	
Registered electors		5,604	
Turnout		2,984	53.25
Rejected ballots		7	0.23
Liberal Democrats hold			
Liberal Democrats hold			
Liberal Democrats hold			

=== Sutton South ===
Sutton South (3)
Party	Candidate	Votes	%
Conservative	Richard T. Barber*	1,948	51.62
Conservative	Jean Brisley	1,938	
Conservative	Peter H. Geiringer*	1,864	
Liberal Democrats	James G. Rae	1,054	27.81
Liberal Democrats	Andrew J. Snelling	1,044	
Liberal Democrats	Cicely J. Willis	1,000	
Labour	Geoffrey Brennan	520	13.09
Labour	Brian D. Dougherty	485	
Labour	David C. Fleming	454	
Green	Ian Moore	278	7.48
Registered electors		7,534	
Turnout		3,674	48.77
Rejected ballots		6	0.16
Conservative hold			
Conservative hold			
Conservative hold			

=== Sutton West ===
Sutton West (2)
Party	Candidate	Votes	%
Liberal Democrats	Lynette R.M. Gleeson	1,617	63.91
Liberal Democrats	Timothy J. Lockington	1,557	
Conservative	Douglas A. James	760	29.20
Conservative	Tamjid H. Basunia	690	
Labour	Alison Henshall	173	6.89
Labour	Ronald S. Williams	169	
Registered electors		4,299	
Turnout		2,573	59.85
Rejected ballots		2	0.08
Liberal Democrats hold			
Liberal Democrats hold			

=== Wallington North ===
Wallington North (3)
Party	Candidate	Votes	%
Conservative	Jack L. Izard*	1,617	43.75
Conservative	Joan W. Quattrucci*	1,569	
Conservative	Craydon R. Care	1,456	
Liberal Democrats	Joseph P. Farrelly	1,136	30.46
Liberal Democrats	Obhijit Chatterjee	1,050	
Liberal Democrats	Stanley A.G. Theed	1,044	
Labour	Susanne F. Imrie	687	18.52
Labour	Susan F. Mansell	658	
Labour	Anne Towner	620	
Green	Karin C.V. Andrews	274	7.27
Green	John R. Cooper	239	
Registered electors		7,153	
Turnout		3,685	51.52
Rejected ballots		0	0.00
Conservative hold			
Conservative hold			
Conservative hold			

=== Wallington South ===
Wallington South (3)
Party	Candidate	Votes	%
Conservative	Frederick L. Townsend*	1,709	41.93
Conservative	Michael V. Pike	1,697	
Conservative	David P. Waterman*	1,620	
Liberal Democrats	Sarah M. Hickman	999	24.08
Liberal Democrats	John W.E. Leach	999	
Liberal Democrats	Trevor C. Cartmel	887	
Labour	Johanna G. Baker	599	13.64
Labour	Michael J. McLoughlin	556	
Labour	Clive S. Poge	481	
SDP	Richard H. Sammons	389	9.74
Green	Maria E. Andrews	290	7.26
Raving Loony Green Giant	Danny J. Bamford	134	3.35
Registered electors		6,969	
Turnout		3,697	53.05
Rejected ballots		0	0.00
Conservative hold			
Conservative hold			
Conservative hold			

=== Wandle Valley ===
Wandle Valley (2)
Party	Candidate	Votes	%
Labour	Michael R. Woolley*	877	43.22
Liberal Democrats	Matthew R. Bishop	869	42.36
Labour	Garry M. Brennan	849	
Liberal Democrats	John W. Drage	823	
Conservative	Peter A. Forrestier-Smith	294	14.42
Conservative	Peter Fruin	281	
Registered electors		3,674	
Turnout		2,077	56.53
Rejected ballots		1	0.05
Labour hold			
Labour gain from Liberal Democrats			

=== Woodcote ===
Woodcote (1)
Party	Candidate	Votes	%
Conservative	Graham G. Whitham*	1,025	71.18
Liberal Democrats	Hazel A. Leach	283	19.65
Labour	Ann K. Poge	132	9.17
Registered electors		2,645	
Turnout		1,445	54.63
Rejected ballots		5	0.35
Conservative hold			

=== Worcester Park North ===
Worcester Park North (3)
Party	Candidate	Votes	%
Liberal Democrats	Ruth M. Shaw*	1,820	47.94
Liberal Democrats	Gareth W. Campbell*	1,800	
Liberal Democrats	Vinod Sharma	1,780	
Conservative	David J.H. Trafford	1,433	37.82
Conservative	Peter A.C. Woolley	1,427	
Conservative	Janet S. Woolley	1,401	
Labour	David M. Roberts	376	9.53
Labour	Susanne J. Mitchell	354	
Labour	David R. Jones	343	
Green	Mark A. Brett	177	4.71
Registered electors		6,413	
Turnout		3,656	57.01
Rejected ballots		4	0.11
Liberal Democrats hold			
Liberal Democrats hold			
Liberal Democrats hold			

=== Worcester Park South ===
Worcester Park South (2)
Party	Candidate	Votes	%
Liberal Democrats	Roger D.C. Roberts*	1,422	52.84
Liberal Democrats	David M. Little	1,401	
Conservative	William Carruthers	1,063	39.15
Conservative	David P. Lindfield	1,029	
Labour	John K. Evers	214	8.01
Labour	Judith A. Evers	213	
Registered electors		4,383	
Turnout		2,750	62.74
Rejected ballots		4	0.15
Liberal Democrats hold			
Liberal Democrats hold			

=== Wrythe Green ===
Wrythe Green (2)
Party	Candidate	Votes	%
Liberal Democrats	Sheila C. Siggins	1,412	47.43
Liberal Democrats	Susan M. Stears	1,306	
Conservative	Patricia Shaw-Davis	853	29.46
Conservative	Nicholas W.J. Kendall	834	
Labour	Richard T. Mackie	501	17.17
Labour	Anthony R. Thorpe	483	
Green	William E. Fuller	170	5.93
Registered electors		5,192	
Turnout		2,935	56.53
Rejected ballots		5	0.17
Liberal Democrats hold			
Liberal Democrats hold			
