= Sutton London Borough Council elections =

Class of UK elections

A map showing the wards of Sutton since 2022

Sutton London Borough Council in London, England is elected every four years.

== Summary results ==
Year	Liberal Democrats	Conservative	Labour	Reform	Residents Association /Independent	Notes
1964	0	30	17	N/A	4	
1968	0	41	7	N/A	3	
1971	0	25	21	N/A	5	
1974	6	28	13	N/A	4	
1978	2	47	7	N/A	0	Boundary changes increased number of seats by five
1982	3	46	7	N/A	0	
1986	28	21	7	N/A	0	
1990	32	18	6	N/A	0	
1994	47	4	5	N/A	0	Boundary changes took place but the number of seats remained the same (Note: The Greater London and Surrey (County and London Borough Boundaries) (No. 3) Order 1993)
1998	46	5	5	N/A	0	Boundary changes took place but the number of seats remained the same (Note: The Croydon, Merton and Sutton (London Borough Boundaries) Order 1993) (Note: The Greater London and Surrey (County and London Borough Boundaries) Order 1994)
2002	43	8	3	N/A	0	Boundary changes reduced the number of seats by two
2006	32	22	0	N/A	0	
2010	43	11	0	N/A	0	
2014	45	9	0	N/A	0	
2018	33	18	0	N/A	3	
2022	29	20	3	N/A	3	Boundary changes increased the number of seats by one
2026	51	0	1	2	1	

== Borough result maps ==
2002 results map

2006 results map

2010 results map

2014 results map

2018 results map

2022 results map

2026 results map

== By-election results ==
=== 1964-1968 ===
There were no by-elections.

=== 1968-1971 ===
Cheam West by-election, 4 July 1968
Party	Candidate	Votes	%	±%
Conservative	H. A. Bennett	909	97.8	
Labour	A. J. Barker	20	2.2	
Turnout			17.5%	

Sutton South East by-election, 4 July 1968
Party	Candidate	Votes	%	±%
Conservative	R. C. Squire	522	87.9	
Labour	J. Dowsett	72	12.1	
Turnout			14.1%	

Cheam South by-election, 22 January 1970
Party	Candidate	Votes	%	±%
Conservative	K. A. Rose	1093	97.2	
Labour	P. M. Brennan	31	2.8	
Turnout			21.1%	

Sutton East by-election, 28 May 1970
Party	Candidate	Votes	%	±%
Conservative	A. J. Kenney	442		
Labour	E. M. McEwen	428		
Liberal	D. E. Strong	139		
Turnout			28.2%	

=== 1971-1974 ===
There were no by-elections.

=== 1974-1978 ===
Sutton Central by-election, 17 April 1975
Party	Candidate	Votes	%	±%
Liberal	John Mullin	1,176		
Labour	James Rhodes	547		
Conservative	Lesley Symonds	445		
Turnout			55.0	

Sutton South East by-election, 17 June 1976
Party	Candidate	Votes	%	±%
Conservative	Peter Geiringer	1,591		
Liberal	Eva Liston	513		
Labour	Ada Pinkney	168		
National Front	Roy Trethewey	166		
Turnout			48.8	

=== 1990-1994 ===
Beddington South by-election, 30 July 1992
Party	Candidate	Votes	%	±%
Liberal Democrats	Olive Edwards	1,108	43.8	
Conservative	Andrew Beadle	824	32.5	
Labour	Stephen Lloyd	464	18.3	
Green	John Cornford	91	3.6	
Raving Loony Green Giant Party	Danny Bamford	45	1.8	
Turnout			38.6	
Liberal Democrats hold		Swing		

The by-election was called following the resignation of Cllr Alan Chewter.

=== 1994-1998 ===
Carshalton North by-election, 20 October 1994
Party	Candidate	Votes	%	±%
Liberal Democrats	Anthony Pattison	880		
Labour	Margaret Smart	560		
Conservative	Eric Pillinger	258		
Monster Raving Loony	John Major	30		
Green	Peter Rudkin	15		
Turnout				
Liberal Democrats hold		Swing		

The by-election was called following the resignation of Cllr. Delphine C. Lock.

St Helier North by-election, 23 March 1995
Party	Candidate	Votes	%	±%
Labour	John Morgan	1,641		
Liberal Democrats	John Bull	645		
Conservative	Brian Keynes	111		
Monster Raving Loony	John Major	33		
Turnout				
Labour hold		Swing		

The by-election was called following the disqualification of Cllr Patrick Kane.

Carshalton Beeches by-election, 18 May 1995
Party	Candidate	Votes	%	±%
Liberal Democrats	Roy Bentley	1,497		
Conservative	Keith Martin	816		
Labour	Claire Shearer	651		
Green	John Cornford	67		
Monster Raving Loony	John Major	31		
Turnout				
Liberal Democrats hold		Swing		

The by-election was called following the resignation of Cllr Daphne Gvozdenovie.

Sutton Common by-election, 7 December 1995
Party	Candidate	Votes	%	±%
Liberal Democrats	Anne Gallop	878		
Labour	Mark Allison	397		
Conservative	Christopher Furey	270		
Ind. Conservative	Gerald Ward	68		
Monster Raving Loony	John Major	16		
Turnout				
Liberal Democrats hold		Swing		

The by-election was called following the resignation of Cllr Richard Broadbent.

Sutton West by-election, 21 November 1996
Party	Candidate	Votes	%	±%
Liberal Democrats	Joan Crowhurst	894	60.6	
Conservative	Roger Ison	315	21.4	
Labour	Ronald Williams	266	18.0	
Monster Raving Loony	Danny Blue	18	1.2	
Majority		579	39.2	
Turnout		1,493	34.1	
Liberal Democrats hold		Swing		

The by-election was called following the resignation of Cllr Christine Headley.

St Helier North by-election, 13 February 1997
Party	Candidate	Votes	%	±%
Labour	Joyce Smith	1,058	60.5	
Liberal Democrats	Colin Hall	512	29.3	
Conservative	Brian Keynes	130	7.4	
Independent St Hellier Party	Donald Langridge	40	2.3	
Monster Raving Loony	Danny Blue	10	0.6	
Majority		546	31.2	
Turnout		1,750	28.8	
Labour hold		Swing		

The by-election was called following the death of Cllr Donald Hopkins.

St Helier South by-election, 21 August 1997
Party	Candidate	Votes	%	±%
Labour	Stephen Lloyd	538	57.1	+4.8
Liberal Democrats	Sheila Andrews	335	35.5	−4.4
Conservative	Brian Keynes	57	6.0	−1.8
Monster Raving Loony	Danny Blue	13	1.4	+1.4
Majority		203	21.6	
Turnout		943	24.2	
Labour hold		Swing		

The by-election was called following the resignation of Cllr Gary Stagg.

=== 1998-2002 ===
Cheam South by-election, 23 September 1999
Party	Candidate	Votes	%	±%
Conservative	David Park	962	69.1	+3.6
Liberal Democrats	Keith Legg	248	17.8	−10.2
Independent	Glenn Abbassi	84	6.0	+6.0
Labour	David Jarman	76	5.5	−1.0
Independent	William Smith	23	1.7	+1.7
Majority		714	51.3	
Turnout		1,393	30.6	
Conservative hold		Swing		

The by-election was called following the resignation of Cllr Sarah Wallace.

Beddington South by-election, 7 June 2001
Party	Candidate	Votes	%	±%
Liberal Democrats	Ferris Moussa	1,380	39.8	−13.0
Conservative	Louise Heale	1,081	31.1	+10.5
Labour	Joseph Magee	1,009	29.1	+3.5
Majority		299	8.7	
Turnout		3,470	56.2	
Liberal Democrats hold		Swing		

The by-election was called following the resignation of Cllr Richard Aitken.

=== 2002-2006 ===
Carshalton Central by-election, 21 November 2002
Party	Candidate	Votes	%	±%
Liberal Democrats	Christopher Pennington	996	45.2	−7.0
Conservative	Paul Scully	837	38.0	+6.6
Labour	Sam Towler	268	12.2	+3.1
Green	Susan Riddlestone	103	4.7	−2.7
Majority		159	7.2	
Turnout		2,204	29.9	
Liberal Democrats hold		Swing		

The by-election was called following the resignation of Cllr Michael Cooper.

=== 2006-2010 ===
Cheam by-election, 28 February 2008
Party	Candidate	Votes	%	±%
Conservative	Jonathan Pritchard	1,541	45.8	−12.0
Liberal Democrats	Wendy Mathys	1,454	43.3	+3.9
UKIP	Francis Day	260	7.7	+7.7
Labour	Kathleen Allen	106	3.2	+0.5
Majority		87	2.5	
Turnout		3,361	44.0	
Conservative hold		Swing		

The by-election was called following the disqualification of Cllr Eleanor Pinfold.

Nonsuch by-election, 2 July 2009
Party	Candidate	Votes	%	±%
Liberal Democrats	Gerry Jerome	1,665	50.6	+4.0
Conservative	Georg Braun	1,329	40.4	−7.2
BNP	Peter North	211	6.4	+6.4
Labour	Marcus Papadopoulus	88	2.7	−3.3
Majority		336	10.2	
Turnout		3,293	41.0	
Liberal Democrats hold		Swing		

The by-election was called following the death of Cllr Christopher Dunlop.

=== 2010-2014 ===
Worcester Park by-election, 16 February 2012
Party	Candidate	Votes	%	±%
Liberal Democrats	Roger Roberts	1367		
Conservative	Simon Densley	977		
Labour	Hilary Hosking	315		
UKIP	David Pickles	190		
Green	George Dow	46		
Turnout			33.5%	
Liberal Democrats hold		Swing		

The by-election was called following the resignation of Cllr Jennifer Campbell-Klomps.

Stonecot by-election, 6 December 2012
Party	Candidate	Votes	%	±%
Liberal Democrats	Nick Emmerson	1034		
Conservative	Graham Jarvis	402		
Labour	Bonnie Craven	289		
UKIP	Jeremy Wraith	182		
Green	Joan Hartfield	32		
Turnout			24%	
Liberal Democrats hold		Swing		

The by-election was called following the resignation of Cllr Brendan Hudson.

=== 2014-2018 ===
Wallington South by-election, 11 June 2015
Party	Candidate	Votes	%	±%
Liberal Democrats	Steve Cook	1,251	44.1	▼6.9
Conservative	Jim Simms	936	33.0	▲13.7
Labour	Sarah Gwynn	181	6.4	▼2.4
Independent	Duncan Mattey	180	6.4	▲6.4
UKIP	Andy Beadle	164	5.8	▼10.5
Green	Rosa Rajendran	122	4.3	▼2.7
Majority		315	11.1	
Turnout		2,835	35.4	
Liberal Democrats hold		Swing		

The by-election was triggered by the death of Cllr Colin Hall, the Liberal Democrat deputy leader.

Carshalton Central by-election, 28 July 2016
Party	Candidate	Votes	%	±%
Liberal Democrats	Chris Williams	1,250	43.4	▼5.1
Conservative	Melissa Pearce	1,061	36.9	▲11.6
Green	Ross Hemingway	211	7.3	▼0.3
Labour	Sarah Gwynn	176	6.1	▼3.1
UKIP	Bill Main-Ian	150	5.2	▼10.5
CPA	Ashley Dickenson	29	1.0	▼1.1
Turnout		2,881	27.04%	
Liberal Democrats hold		Swing		

The by-election was triggered by the resignation of Cllr Alan Salter

=== 2018-2022 ===
Belmont by-election, 25 October 2018
Party	Candidate	Votes	%	±%
Conservative	Neil Garratt	1,328	46.7	▼9.6
Liberal Democrats	Dean Juster	1,069	37.6	▲10.7
Labour	Marian Wingrove	303	10.7	▼6.1
Green	Claire Jackson-Prior	63	2.2	▲2.2
UKIP	John Bannon	50	1.8	▲1.8
CPA	Ashley Dickenson	30	1.1	▲1.1
Majority		259	9.1	
Turnout		2,843		
Conservative hold		Swing		

The by-election was triggered by the resignation of Cllr Patrick McManus.

Wallington North by-election, 28 March 2019
Party	Candidate	Votes	%	±%
Liberal Democrats	Barry Lewis	1,039	38.2	▼7.8
Conservative	Charlotte Leonard	709	26.1	▲0.5
Independent	Gervais Sawyer	381	14.0	▲14.0
Labour	Sheila Berry	301	11.1	▼5.6
Green	Verity Thomson	166	6.1	▼2.3
UKIP	John Bannon	104	3.8	▲0.5
CPA	Ashley Dickenson	17	0.6	▲0.6
Majority		330	12.1	
Turnout		2,717		
Liberal Democrats hold		Swing		

The by-election was triggered by the resignation of Cllr Joyce Melican.

=== 2022-2026 ===
St Helier West by-election, 2 May 2024
Party	Candidate	Votes	%	±%
Conservative	Catherine Gray	1,342	35.4	+4.3
Liberal Democrats	Noor Sumun	1,336	35.3	+7.7
Labour	Margaret Thomas	682	18.0	−14.1
Independent	Hamilton Activist Kingsley	367	9.7	+9.7
Independent	Renos Costi	62	1.6	+1.6
Majority		6	0.2	
Turnout		3,789		
Conservative gain from Labour		Swing		

The by-election was triggered by the resignation of Cllr Sheila Berry.

Sutton Central by-election, 10 April 2025
Party	Candidate	Votes	%	±%
Liberal Democrats	Richard Choi	1,291	55.7	+16.8
Conservative	Maria Arif	327	14.1	−8.8
Reform	Joanna Bishop	282	12.2	+12.2
Labour	Kerrie Peek	216	9.3	−17.9
Green	Peter Friel	95	4.1	−7.0
Independent	Pamela Marsh	84	3.6	+3.6
CPA	Ashley Dickenson	24	1.0	+1.0
Majority		964	41.6	
Turnout		2,319		
Liberal Democrats hold		Swing		

The by-election was triggered by the disqualification of Cllr David Bartolucci for non-attendance.

Carshalton South and Clockhouse by-election, 10 April 2025
Party	Candidate	Votes	%	±%
Liberal Democrats	Lisa Webster	1,674	52.2	+12.1
Conservative	Christopher da Cruz	767	23.9	−18.2
Reform	Arlene Dearlove	573	17.9	+17.9
Labour	John Keys	89	2.8	−5.4
Green	Peter Friel	79	2.5	−7.1
CPA	Ashley Dickenson	23	0.7	+0.7
Majority		907	28.3	
Turnout		3,205		
Liberal Democrats hold		Swing		

The by-election was triggered by the resignation of Cllr Amy Haldane.
