= 1994 Sutton London Borough Council election =

1994 local election in England

- 5 May 1994

All 56 seats up for election to Sutton London Borough Council 29 seats needed for a majority
- Registered: 127,974
- Turnout: 63,086, 49.30%

	First party	Second party	Third party
Leader	Graham N. Tope	Unknown	Unknown
Party	Liberal Democrats	Labour	Conservative
Leader since	1986	Unknown	Unknown
Leader's seat	Sutton Central	Unknown	Unknown
Seats before	32	6	18
Seats won	47	5	4
Seat change	▲15	▼1	▼14
Popular vote	78,659	22,533	35,563
Percentage	56.09%	16.07%	25.36%
Swing	▲14.04	▼1.58	▼12.45
Council control before election
Liberal Democrats
Council control after election
Liberal Democrats

The 1994 Sutton Council election took place on 5 May 1994 to elect members of Sutton London Borough Council in London, England. The whole council was up for election and the Liberal Democrats stayed in overall control of the council.

== Election result ==
The Liberal Democrats won a majority vote in the election, and both the Conservative party and Labour party lost a significant portion of their votes to the Liberal Democrats.

1994 Sutton Local Elections
Party	Seats	Gains	Losses	Net gain/loss	Seats %	Votes %	Votes	+/−
Liberal Democrats	47	15	0	▲15	83.93	56.15	78,659	▲14.10
Labour	5	0	1	▼1	8.93	16.09	22,533	▼1.56
Conservative	4	0	14	▼14	7.14	25.39	35,563	▼12.42
Green	0	0	0	Steady	0.00	1.95	2,737	▲0.22
Independent	0	0	0	Steady	0.00	0.27	385	New
BNP	0	0	0	Steady	0.00	0.14	199	New
Total	56						140,076	

== Ward results ==
(*) - Indicates an incumbent candidate

(†) - Indicates an incumbent candidate standing in a different ward

=== Beddington North ===
Beddington North (2)
Party	Candidate	Votes	%	±%
Liberal Democrats	Pamela Cooper	1,496	58.39	▲8.32
Liberal Democrats	John Leach	1,425		
Conservative	Moira Butt	709	27.34	▼9.14
Conservative	Eric Pillinger	659		
Labour	Margaret Thomas	236	9.27	▲0.37
Labour	Anthony Frempong	227		
Green	Peter Rudkin	125	5.00	▲0.45
Registered electors		4,848		▲147
Turnout		2,604	53.71	▼7.96
Rejected ballots		1	0.04	▲0.04
Liberal Democrats hold				
Liberal Democrats hold				

=== Beddington South ===
Beddington South (3)
Party	Candidate	Votes	%	±%
Liberal Democrats	Robert Irving*	1,746	61.25	▲18.09
Liberal Democrats	Colleen Saunders*	1,655		
Liberal Democrats	Olive Edwards* (Note: Edwards replaced Cllr Alan Chewter after his resignation in 1992)	1,646		
Labour	Jacqueline McLoughlin	537	18.97	▼6.94
Labour	Stephen Bailey	523		
Labour	William Blunden	502		
Conservative	Brian Keynes	467	16.72	▼10.51
Conservative	Mark Rowley	464		
Conservative	Christopher Casselden	447		
Independent	Lawrance Gibbons	84	3.06	New
Registered electors		6,477		▼81
Turnout		2,962	45.73	▼8.36
Rejected ballots		3	0.10	▼0.07
Liberal Democrats hold				
Liberal Democrats hold				
Liberal Democrats hold				

=== Belmont ===
Belmont (2)
Party	Candidate	Votes	%	±%
Liberal Democrats	Anthony Wallace	1,153	43.58	▲19.49
Liberal Democrats	Andrew Snelling	1,127		
Conservative	Roger Ison	1,116	42.12	▼16.43
Conservative	Simon Pritchett	1,088		
Labour	Paul Harrison	252	9.52	▼1.52
Labour	Sarah Stewart	246		
Green	Heather Jarrett	125	4.78	▼1.55
Registered electors		5,716		▲603
Turnout		2,668	46.68	▼3.66
Rejected ballots		1	0.04	▼0.08
Liberal Democrats gain from Conservative				
Liberal Democrats gain from Conservative				

=== Carshalton Beeches ===
Carshalton Beeches (3)
Party	Candidate	Votes	%	±%
Liberal Democrats	Gary Miles	1,574	43.53	▲18.77
Liberal Democrats	Margaret Woodley	1,512		
Liberal Democrats	Daphne Gvozdenovic	1,463		
Conservative	Mavis Peart*	1,328	37.81	▼10.59
Conservative	Keith Martin*	1,317		
Conservative	Edward Crowley*	1,307		
Labour	Claire Shearer	493	12.20	▲1.81
Labour	Peter Randall	395		
Labour	Anne Towner	387		
Green	Wendy Cornford	225	6.46	▼1.09
Registered electors		6,726		▲62
Turnout		3,428	50.97	▼4.60
Rejected ballots		0	0.00	▼0.05
Liberal Democrats gain from Conservative				
Liberal Democrats gain from Conservative				
Liberal Democrats gain from Conservative				

=== Carshalton Central ===
Carshalton Central (2)
Party	Candidate	Votes	%	±%
Liberal Democrats	Tom Brake	1,338	52.73	▲6.30
Liberal Democrats	Angela Baughan	1,290		
Conservative	Lea Deely	639	25.12	▼13.51
Conservative	Timothy Harmon-De Clare	613		
Green	Robert Steel	459	12.68	▲7.12
Labour	Douglas Banks	253	9.47	▲0.70
Labour	Anna-Marie Cummins	218		
Green	Dennis Tomlin	172		
Registered electors		4,740		▲65
Turnout		2,573	54.28	▼6.00
Rejected ballots		1	0.04	▼0.10
Liberal Democrats hold				
Liberal Democrats hold				

=== Carshalton North ===
Carshalton North (2)
Party	Candidate	Votes	%	±%
Liberal Democrats	Michael Cooper*	1,818	66.76	▲11.40
Liberal Democrats	Delphine Lock	1,640		
Conservative	Harry Rogers	458	16.79	▼12.73
Conservative	Michael Rowback	412		
Labour	Katherine Green	302	11.35	▲0.50
Labour	Mark Green	285		
Green	Neil Hornsby	132	5.10	▲0.83
Registered electors		5,077		▼66
Turnout		2,693	53.04	▼5.06
Rejected ballots		1	0.04	▼0.06
Liberal Democrats hold				
Liberal Democrats hold				

=== Cheam South ===
Cheam South (2)
Party	Candidate	Votes	%	±%
Conservative	Lynette Ranson*	1,335	60.31	▼11.15
Conservative	Edward Trevor*	1,245		
Liberal Democrats	David Little	548	24.78	▲7.47
Liberal Democrats	Patricia Roberts	511		
Independent	Viviane Mackrory-Jamieson	194	9.07	New
Labour	David Jarman	139	5.84	▲0.86
Labour	Claire Snelling	110		
Registered electors		4,391		▲19
Turnout		2,126	48.42	▼7.53
Rejected ballots		1	0.05	▲0.01
Conservative hold				
Conservative hold				

=== Cheam West ===
Cheam West (2)
Party	Candidate	Votes	%	±%
Liberal Democrats	Robert Gleeson	1,396	57.28	▲11.26
Liberal Democrats	Mark Steward	1,373		
Conservative	Peter Coulston	691	28.45	▼15.94
Conservative	Adrian Taylor	684		
Labour	Denise Dixon	200	7.78	▲1.61
Labour	Gale Montgomery	176		
Independent	Andrew Bate	107	4.42	New
Green	Edith Scaffardi	50	2.07	▼1.36
Registered electors		4,355		▲59
Turnout		2,418	55.52	▼6.70
Rejected ballots		2	0.08	▲0.08
Liberal Democrats hold				
Liberal Democrats hold				

=== Clockhouse ===
Clockhouse (1)
Party	Candidate	Votes	%	±%
Liberal Democrats	James Daly	583	64.14	▲40.68
Conservative	John Care	163	17.93	▼37.64
Labour	John Weir	163	17.93	▼3.04
Registered electors		1,523		▼37
Turnout		909	59.68	▼4.81
Rejected ballots		0	0.00	Steady
Liberal Democrats gain from Conservative				

=== North Cheam ===
North Cheam (2)
Party	Candidate	Votes	%	±%
Liberal Democrats	Ruth Shaw^{†} (Note: Shaw was a sitting councillor representing the Worcester Park North ward)	1,683	70.56	▲8.16
Liberal Democrats	Julian Freeman	1,676		
Conservative	Joan Sharvill	464	18.94	▼10.53
Conservative	Margaret Clark	437		
Labour	Gillian Morris	255	10.50	▲2.37
Labour	Paul Morris	244		
Registered electors		4,896		▲90
Turnout		2,513	51.33	▼8.32
Rejected ballots		2	0.08	▲0.04
Liberal Democrats hold				
Liberal Democrats hold				

=== Rosehill ===
Rosehill (2)
Party	Candidate	Votes	%	±%
Liberal Democrats	Paul Burstow*	1,637	73.04	▲13.06
Liberal Democrats	Mary Kemm	1,511		
Conservative	Stanley Lever	401	18.47	▼12.52
Conservative	Lorna Rayne	395		
Labour	Martin Cole	194	8.49	▼0.54
Labour	David Pollard	177		
Registered electors		4,417		▲6
Turnout		2,251	50.96	▼9.77
Rejected ballots		2	0.09	▲0.05
Liberal Democrats hold				
Liberal Democrats hold				

=== St Helier North ===
St Helier North (3)
Party	Candidate	Votes	%	±%
Labour	Patrick Kane*	1,314	49.94	▼8.46
Labour	Donald Hopkins*	1,288		
Labour	Andrew Theobald	1,146		
Liberal Democrats	Anthony Brett Young	890	33.43	▲10.64
Liberal Democrats	Lawrence Smith	823		
Liberal Democrats	Barry Reed	796		
Conservative	Robert Creece	226	8.67	▼8.10
Conservative	Beryl Pidgeon	215		
Conservative	Alison Pike	209		
BNP	Jennifer Oliver	199	7.96	New
Registered electors		6,101		▼129
Turnout		2,675	43.85	▼3.31
Rejected ballots		2	0.07	▼0.07
Labour hold				
Labour hold				
Labour hold				

=== St Helier South ===
St Helier South (2)
Party	Candidate	Votes	%	±%
Labour	Charles Mansell*	835	52.10	▼11.56
Labour	Gary Stagg	779		
Liberal Democrats	John Brennan	638	40.28	▲20.22
Liberal Democrats	Neil Frater	610		
Conservative	Michael Deann-Valentine	125	7.62	▲5.35
Conservative	Patrick Jaques	110		
Registered electors		4,126		▲272
Turnout		1,620	39.26	▼7.31
Rejected ballots		2	0.12	▼0.21
Labour hold				
Labour hold				

=== Sutton Central ===
Sutton Central (2)
Party	Candidate	Votes	%	±%
Liberal Democrats	Graham Tope*	1,608	72.97	▲13.91
Liberal Democrats	Keith Pitkin*	1,533		
Conservative	Bryan Gale	320	14.54	▼9.27
Conservative	Alfred Taylor	305		
Labour	David Fleming	284	12.49	▼2.34
Labour	John Evers	253		
Registered electors		4,886		▲51
Turnout		2,288	46.83	▼5.41
Rejected ballots		8	0.35	▲0.19
Liberal Democrats hold				
Liberal Democrats hold				

=== Sutton Common ===
Sutton Common (2)
Party	Candidate	Votes	%	±%
Liberal Democrats	Lesley O'Connell*	1,723	88.02	▲22.96
Liberal Democrats	Richard Brodbent*	1,716		
Labour	Herbert Smith	239	11.98	▲3.56
Labour	George Dunton	229		
Registered electors		4,460		▲70
Turnout		2,144	48.07	▼12.00
Rejected ballots		55	2.57	▲2.56
Liberal Democrats hold				
Liberal Democrats hold				

=== Sutton East ===
Sutton East (3)
Party	Candidate	Votes	%	±%
Liberal Democrats	Austin Kearney	1,438	51.44	▲1.90
Liberal Democrats	Terence Woods*	1,400		
Liberal Democrats	Janet Lowne	1,395		
Labour	Anthony Thorpe	681	23.44	▲2.75
Labour	Antony Dyson	647		
Labour	Kevin Willsher	602		
Conservative	Christine Hicks	537	19.40	▼10.37
Conservative	Heather Irwin	533		
Conservative	Doreen Leech	527		
Green	Richard Collier	157	5.72	New
Registered electors		5,811		▲207
Turnout		2,810	48.36	▼4.89
Rejected ballots		3	0.11	▼0.12
Liberal Democrats hold				
Liberal Democrats hold				
Liberal Democrats hold				

=== Sutton South ===
Sutton South (3)
Party	Candidate	Votes	%	±%
Liberal Democrats	Donald Brims	1,349	41.54	▲13.73
Conservative	Jean Brisley*	1,283	40.59	▼11.03
Liberal Democrats	Nicholas Cull	1,274		
Conservative	Peter Geiringer*	1,238		
Conservative	David Lindfield	1,194		
Liberal Democrats	Jayanta Chatterjee	1,177		
Labour	Geoffrey Brennan	432	12.39	▼0.70
Labour	Margaret Smart	364		
Labour	Suzanne Imrie	338		
Green	John Cornford	215	5.48	▼2.00
Green	Simon Honey	153		
Green	Maureen Peglar	132		
Registered electors		7,631		▲97
Turnout		3,224	42.25	▼6.52
Rejected ballots		0	0.00	▼0.16
Liberal Democrats gain from Conservative				
Conservative hold				
Liberal Democrats gain from Conservative				

=== Sutton West ===
Sutton West (2)
Party	Candidate	Votes	%	±%
Liberal Democrats	Christine Headley	1,593	67.01	▲3.10
Liberal Democrats	Gerard Jerome	1,428		
Conservative	Linda Verner	513	22.70	▼6.50
Conservative	Glenys Longhurst	510		
Labour	Christopher Dixon	163	7.01	▲0.12
Labour	Ronald Williams	153		
Green	Jose Hickson	79	3.28	New
Green	Peter Hickson	68		
Registered electors		4,321		▲22
Turnout		2,287	52.93	▼6.92
Rejected ballots		1	0.04	▼0.04
Liberal Democrats hold				
Liberal Democrats hold				

=== Wallington North ===
Wallington North (3)
Party	Candidate	Votes	%	±%
Liberal Democrats	John Dodwell	2,070	56.82	▲26.36
Liberal Democrats	Michael Lyon	1,946		
Liberal Democrats	Peter Overy	1,918		
Conservative	Howard Bowles	861	24.42	▼19.33
Conservative	Craydon Care*	845		
Conservative	John Hill	843		
Labour	Gregory Byrne	485	13.30	▼5.22
Labour	Richard Mackie	462		
Labour	Peter Turner	442		
Green	John Cooper	190	5.46	▼1.81
Registered electors		7,035		▼118
Turnout		3,551	50.48	▼1.04
Rejected ballots		1	0.03	▲0.03
Liberal Democrats gain from Conservative				
Liberal Democrats gain from Conservative				
Liberal Democrats gain from Conservative				

=== Wallington South ===
Wallington South (3)
Party	Candidate	Votes	%	±%
Liberal Democrats	Richard Bailey	1,983	52.28	▲28.20
Liberal Democrats	Brendan Hudson	1,845		
Liberal Democrats	Stanley Theed	1,712		
Conservative	Liane Brisley	1,104	29.97	▼11.96
Conservative	David Martin-Clark	1,053		
Conservative	Michael Pike*	1.021		
Labour	David Murray	392	10.53	▼3.11
Labour	Michael McLoughlin	382		
Labour	Clive Poge	342		
Green	Susan Riddlestone	171	4.84	▼2.42
Monster Raving Loony	John Major	96	2.38	New
Monster Raving Loony	Norma Major	72		
Registered electors		7,153		▲184
Turnout		3,576	49.99	▼3.06
Rejected ballots		3	0.08	▲0.08
Liberal Democrats gain from Conservative				
Liberal Democrats gain from Conservative				
Liberal Democrats gain from Conservative				

=== Wandle Valley ===
Wandle Valley (2)
Party	Candidate	Votes	%	±%
Liberal Democrats	Margaret Court	1,190	56.24	▲13.88
Liberal Democrats	Matthew Bishop*	1,189		
Labour	Stephen Lloyd	758	34.22	▼9.00
Labour	Violet Scotter	690		
Conservative	Ivor Lovell	156	7.04	▼7.38
Conservative	Shirley Lovell	142		
Green	Sean O'Keeffe	53	2.50	New
Registered electors		4,156		▲482
Turnout		2,215	53.30	▼3.23
Rejected ballots		0	0.00	▼0.05
Liberal Democrats gain from Labour				
Liberal Democrats hold				

=== Woodcote ===
Woodcote (1)
Party	Candidate	Votes	%	±%
Conservative	Graham Whitham*	777	59.40	▼11.78
Liberal Democrats	Duncan Ponikwer	411	31.42	▲11.77
Labour	Ann Poge	120	9.18	▲0.01
Registered electors		2,710		▲65
Turnout		1,308	48.27	▼6.36
Rejected ballots		0	0.00	▼0.35
Conservative hold				

=== Worcester Park North ===
Worcester Park North (3)
Party	Candidate	Votes	%	±%
Liberal Democrats	Carol Campbell^{†} (Note: Campbell was a sitting councillor representing North Cheam ward)	2,058	63.18	▲15.24
Liberal Democrats	Gareth Campbell*	2,055		
Liberal Democrats	Arnold Shaw	1,940		
Conservative	Alan Brown	800	23.54	▼14.28
Conservative	Clifford Carter	730		
Conservative	Beryl Moxon	727		
Labour	David Jones	299	8.86	▼0.67
Labour	Hilary Hosking	286		
Labour	Margaret Kossowicz	263		
Green	Ian Moore	141	4.42	▼0.29
Registered electors		6,848		▲435
Turnout		3,287	48.00	▼9.01
Rejected ballots		0	0.00	▼0.11
Liberal Democrats hold				
Liberal Democrats hold				
Liberal Democrats hold				

=== Worcester Park South ===
Worcester Park South (2)
Party	Candidate	Votes	%	±%
Liberal Democrats	Roger Roberts*	1,652	71.60	▲18.76
Liberal Democrats	Michael Shaw	1,636		
Conservative	Alan Osborne	485	20.25	▼18.90
Conservative	Hilary Wortley	444		
Labour	Alan Olive	188	8.15	▲0.14
Labour	Alan Mowatt	185		
Registered electors		4,424		▲41
Turnout		2,370	53.57	▼9.17
Rejected ballots		1	0.04	▼0.11
Liberal Democrats hold				
Liberal Democrats hold				

=== Wrythe Green ===
Wrythe Green (2)
Party	Candidate	Votes	%	±%
Liberal Democrats	Sheila Siggins*	1,476	58.77	▲11.34
Liberal Democrats	Susan Stears*	1,445		
Labour	John Morgan	500	19.67	▲2.50
Labour	Susan Mansell	478		
Conservative	Elaine Jones	454	17.94	▼11.52
Conservative	Patricia Shaw-Davis	437		
Green	William Fuller	90	3.62	▼2.31
Registered electors		5,146		▼46
Turnout		2,587	50.27	▼6.26
Rejected ballots		2	0.08	▼0.09
Liberal Democrats hold				
Liberal Democrats hold				
