= 1998 Sutton London Borough Council election =

1998 local election in England

- 7 May 1998

All 56 seats up for election to Sutton London Borough Council 29 seats needed for a majority
- Registered: 130,971
- Turnout: 46,293, 35.35% (▼13.95)

	First party	Second party	Third party
Leader	Graham N. Tope	Unknown	Unknown
Party	Liberal Democrats	Conservative	Labour
Leader since	1988	Unknown	Unknown
Leader's seat	Sutton Central	Unknown	Unknown
Last election	47 seats, 56.15%	4 seats, 25.39%	5 seats, 16.09%
Seats won	46	5	5
Seat change	▼1	▲1	Steady
Popular vote	53,673	29,228	18,517
Percentage	51.81%	28.21%	17.87%
Swing	▼4.34	▲2.82	▲1.78
Council control before election
Liberal Democrats
Council control after election
Liberal Democrats

The 1998 Sutton Council election took place on 7 May 1998 to elect members of Sutton London Borough Council in London, England. The whole council was up for election and the Liberal Democrats stayed in overall control of the council.

== Background ==
In the years between the 1994 election and this election there were a total of 7 by-elections to replace councillors who either resigned from their seat, died in office or who were disqualified shortly after the 1994 election, however these did not result in the seats changing parties. Aside from the by-elections there was also one seat that became vacant shortly before this election and there was not enough time to hold a separate by-election to fill it. This meant the composition of the council just before the election was as follows:

↓
5	47	3	1
Labour	Lib Dem	Conservative	Vacant

== Election result ==
1998 Sutton London Borough Council local elections
Party	Seats	Gains	Losses	Net gain/loss	Seats %	Votes %	Votes	+/−
Liberal Democrats	46	1	2	▼1	82.14	51.81	53,673	▼4.34
Conservative	5	2	1	▲1	8.93	28.21	29,228	▲2.82
Labour	5	0	0	Steady	8.93	17.87	18,517	▲1.78
Green	0	0	0	Steady	0.00	1.91	1,980	▼0.04
Independent	0	0	0	Steady	0.00	0.14	147	▼0.13
BNP	0	0	0	Steady	0.00	0.06	59	▼0.08
Total	56						103,604	

After the election the composition of the council was as follows:

↓
5	46	5
Labour	Lib Dem	Conservative

== Ward results ==
(*) - Indicates an incumbent candidate

(†) - Indicates an incumbent candidate standing in a different ward

=== Beddington North ===
Beddington North (2)
Party	Candidate	Votes	%	±%
Liberal Democrats	Pamela Cooper*	938	56.43	▼1.96
Liberal Democrats	John Leach*	891		
Conservative	Peter Baggott	444	27.25	▼0.09
Conservative	Josephine Reynell	439		
Labour	Margaret Thomas	217	12.99	▲3.72
Labour	Ruth Poppe	204		
Green	Peter Rudkin	55	3.33	▼1.67
Green	Annette Carney	53		
Registered electors		5,085		▲237
Turnout		1,702	33.47	▼20.24
Rejected ballots		3	0.18	▲0.14
Liberal Democrats hold				
Liberal Democrats hold				

=== Beddington South ===
Beddington South (3)
Party	Candidate	Votes	%	±%
Liberal Democrats	Richard Aitken	944	53.66	▼7.59
Liberal Democrats	Niall Dologhan	922		
Liberal Democrats	Colleen Saunders*	916		
Labour	Fiona Wright	455	25.65	▲6.68
Labour	Martin Whelton	449		
Labour	David Wright	426		
Conservative	Keith Martin	372	20.69	▲3.97
Conservative	Lorraine Snowball	357		
Conservative	Hilary Wortley	344		
Registered electors		6,432		▼45
Turnout		1,924	29.91	▼15.82
Rejected ballots		3	0.16	▲0.06
Liberal Democrats hold				
Liberal Democrats hold				
Liberal Democrats hold				

=== Belmont ===
Belmont (2)
Party	Candidate	Votes	%	±%
Liberal Democrats	David Biss	1,412	54.22	▲10.64
Liberal Democrats	Anthony Wallace*	1,343		
Conservative	Christopher Furey	992	37.59	▼4.63
Conservative	Simon Pritchett	918		
Labour	Paul Harrison	133	5.08	▼4.44
Labour	Mark Green	125		
Green	Heather Horner	79	3.11	▼1.67
Registered electors		6,469		▲753
Turnout		2,594	40.10	▼6.58
Rejected ballots		3	0.12	▲0.08
Liberal Democrats hold				
Liberal Democrats hold				

=== Carshalton Beeches ===
Carshalton Beeches (3)
Party	Candidate	Votes	%	±%
Liberal Democrats	Roy Bentley* (Note: Bentley was elected in a by-elections triggered by the resignation of Cllr Daphne Gvozdenovic in 1995)	1,793	56.03	▲12.50
Liberal Democrats	Margaret Woodley*	1,779		
Liberal Democrats	Gary Miles*	1,743		
Conservative	Matthew Hewitt	974	30.42	▼7.39
Conservative	Moira Butt	957		
Conservative	Catriona Davey	955		
Labour	Marilynne Burbage	286	8.62	▼3.58
Labour	Peter Randall	267		
Labour	Katherine Green	265		
Green	John Comford	156	4.93	▼1.53
Registered electors		6,585		▼141
Turnout		3,192	48.47	▼2.50
Rejected ballots		1	0.03	▲0.03
Liberal Democrats hold				
Liberal Democrats hold				
Liberal Democrats hold				

=== Carshalton Central ===
Carshalton Central (2)
Party	Candidate	Votes	%	±%
Liberal Democrats	Angela Baughan*	997	51.90	▼0.83
Liberal Democrats	John Woodley	877		
Conservative	John Tucker	513	28.03	▲2.91
Conservative	Anthony Kitcat	499		
Labour	Donald Hodges	218	11.85	▲2.38
Labour	Patricia Simons	210		
Green	Robert Steel	196	8.22	▼4.46
Green	Andrew Whalley	101		
Registered electors		4,833		▲93
Turnout		1,907	39.46	▼14.82
Rejected ballots		8	0.42	▲0.38
Liberal Democrats hold				
Liberal Democrats hold				

=== Carshalton North ===
Carshalton North (2)
Party	Candidate	Votes	%	±%
Liberal Democrats	Michael Cooper*	1,059	55.84	▼10.92
Liberal Democrats	Philip Hewitt	925		
Conservative	Alison Pike	372	20.32	▲3.53
Conservative	Michael Rowback	350		
Labour	Philip Drury	334	17.65	▲6.30
Labour	Paul Wingrove	293		
Green	Neil Hornsby	110	6.19	▲1.09
Registered electors		5,133		▲56
Turnout		1,845	35.94	▼17.10
Rejected ballots		5	0.27	▲0.23
Liberal Democrats hold				
Liberal Democrats hold				

=== Cheam South ===
Cheam South (2)
Party	Candidate	Votes	%	±%
Conservative	Edward Trevor*	1,199	66.63	▲6.32
Conservative	Sarah Wallace	1,199		
Liberal Democrats	Brendan Hudson^{†} (Note: Hudson was a sitting councillor representing the Wellington South ward)	513	27.51	▲2.73
Liberal Democrats	Patricia Roberts	477		
Labour	David Jarman	119	5.86	▲0.02
Labour	Fiona Thursfield	92		
Registered electors		4,506		▲115
Turnout		1,861	41.30	▼7.12
Rejected ballots		9	0.48	▲0.43
Conservative hold				
Conservative hold				

=== Cheam West ===
Cheam West (2)
Party	Candidate	Votes	%	±%
Liberal Democrats	Lynette Gleeson	831	51.57	▼5.71
Liberal Democrats	Robert Gleeson*	794		
Conservative	John Boyce	584	36.08	▲7.63
Conservative	Marilyn Cappiello	553		
Labour	Stephen Blears	215	12.35	▲4.57
Labour	Margaret Kossowicz	174		
Registered electors		4,318		▼37
Turnout		1,647	38.14	▼17.38
Rejected ballots		6	0.36	▲0.28
Liberal Democrats hold				
Liberal Democrats hold				

=== Clockhouse ===
Clockhouse (1)
Party	Candidate	Votes	%	±%
Liberal Democrats	Roger Thistle	342	49.49	▼14.65
Labour	Kevin Willsher	176	25.47	▲7.54
Conservative	Robert Creece	173	25.04	▲7.11
Registered electors		1,516		▼7
Turnout		690	45.51	▼14.17
Rejected ballots		1	0.14	▲0.14
Liberal Democrats hold				

=== North Cheam ===
North Cheam (2)
Party	Candidate	Votes	%	±%
Liberal Democrats	Julian Freeman*	1,116	56.82	▼13.74
Liberal Democrats	Ruth Shaw*	1,108		
Conservative	Clifford Carter	371	17.96	▼0.98
Conservative	Anne Rawlinson	332		
Labour	Valerie Clarke	255	12.75	▲2.25
Labour	Geoffrey Martin	244		
Green	Simon Dixon	244	12.47	New
Registered electors		5,012		▲116
Turnout		1,751	34.94	▼16.39
Rejected ballots		1	0.06	▼0.02
Liberal Democrats hold				
Liberal Democrats hold				

=== Rosehill ===
Rosehill (2)
Party	Candidate	Votes	%	±%
Liberal Democrats	Paul Burstow*	1,105	67.47	▼6.57
Liberal Democrats	Bella Overy	907		
Conservative	John Hutchinson	371	23.71	▲5.24
Conservative	Stanley Lever	336		
Labour	Brown, John	147	8.82	▲0.33
Labour	David Fleming	116		
Registered electors		4,414		▼3
Turnout		1,619	36.68	▼14.28
Rejected ballots		2	0.12	▲0.03
Liberal Democrats hold				
Liberal Democrats hold				

=== St Helier North ===
St Helier North (3)
Party	Candidate	Votes	%	±%
Labour	Joyce Smith* (Note: Smith was elected in a by-election triggered by the death of Cllr Donald Hopkins in 1997)	977	61.13	▲9.03
Labour	Andrew Theobald*	956		
Labour	John Morgan* (Note: John Morgan was elected in a by-election triggered by the disqualification of Cllr Patrick Kane in 1995)	950		
Liberal Democrats	Barry Reed	404	24.11	▼9.32
Liberal Democrats	Eric Pridham	372		
Liberal Democrats	Peter Ward	361		
Conservative	Brian Keynes	186	11.01	▲1.34
Conservative	William Welch	174		
Conservative	Michael Yeldham	159		
BNP	Paul Ferguson	59	3.75	▼4.21
Registered electors		6,164		▲63
Turnout		1,701	27.60	▼16.25
Rejected ballots		3	0.18	▲0.11
Labour hold				
Labour hold				
Labour hold				

=== St Helier South ===
St Helier South (2)
Party	Candidate	Votes	%	±%
Labour	Charles Mansell*	745	62.94	▲10.84
Labour	Stephen Lloyd* (Note: Lloyd was elected in a by-election triggered by the resignation of Cllr Gary Stagg in 1997)	705		
Liberal Democrats	David Holmes	266	22.74	▼17.54
Liberal Democrats	James Daly^{†} (Note: Daly was a sitting councillor representing the Clockhouse ward)	258		
Conservative	Charles Manton	95	8.07	▲0.45
Conservative	Patrick Jaques	91		
Independent	Donald Langridge	72	6.25	New
Registered electors		4,034		▼92
Turnout		1,172	29.05	▼10.21
Rejected ballots		2	0.17	▲0.05
Labour hold				
Labour hold				

=== Sutton Central ===
Sutton Central (2)
Party	Candidate	Votes	%	±%
Liberal Democrats	Graham Tope*	1,055	68.51	▼4.46
Liberal Democrats	John Brennan	955		
Labour	Kathleen Allen	247	15.51	▲3.02
Conservative	Heather Trevor	247	15.98	▲1.44
Conservative	Linda Verner	222		
Labour	Victor Paulino	208		
Registered electors		4,948		▲62
Turnout		1,555	31.43	▼15.40
Rejected ballots		6	0.39	▲0.04
Liberal Democrats hold				
Liberal Democrats hold				

=== Sutton Common ===
Sutton Common (2)
Party	Candidate	Votes	%	±%
Liberal Democrats	Lesley O'Connell*	961	65.73	▼22.29
Liberal Democrats	Anne Gallop* (Note: Gallop was elected in a by-election triggered by the resignation of Cllr Richard Broadbentin 1995)	932		
Conservative	Peter Fowler	324	21.60	New
Conservative	John Maxwell	298		
Labour	Roy Billings	195	12.67	▲0.69
Labour	Stephen Morton	170		
Registered electors		4,584		▲124
Turnout		1,553	33.88	▼14.19
Rejected ballots		13	0.84	▼1.73
Liberal Democrats hold				
Liberal Democrats hold				

=== Sutton East ===
Sutton East (3)
Party	Candidate	Votes	%	±%
Liberal Democrats	Donald Brims^{†} (Note: Brims was a sitting councillor representing the Sutton South ward)	896	48.33	▲3.11
Liberal Democrats	Janet Lowne*	864		
Liberal Democrats	Lal Hussain	774		
Labour	Gale Blears	533	28.29	▲4.85
Labour	Shawn Buck	495		
Labour	Ronald Williams	455		
Conservative	Doreen Leech	347	19.49	▲0.09
Conservative	Christine Hicks	343		
Conservative	Eaton Swaby	332		
Green	Anne Sweeney	72	3.89	▼1.83
Green	Nicholas Greaves	64		
Registered electors		5,821		▲10
Turnout		1,893	32.52	▼15.84
Rejected ballots		7	0.37	▲0.26
Liberal Democrats hold				
Liberal Democrats hold				
Liberal Democrats hold				

=== Sutton South ===
Sutton South (3)
Party	Candidate	Votes	%	±%
Conservative	Anne Brown	1,212	44.04	▲3.45
Liberal Democrats	Nicholas Cull*	1,191	43.19	▲1.65
Conservative	Peter Geiringer	1,174		
Conservative	Heather Irwin	1,165		
Liberal Democrats	Keith Legg	1,149		
Liberal Democrats	Jayanta Chatterjee	1,142		
Labour	Philip Bassett	289	8.69	▼3.70
Labour	Julie Shields	218		
Labour	Anand Shulka	194		
Green	Simon Honey	129	4.07	▼1.41
Green	Maureen Peglar	90		
Registered electors		7,768		▲137
Turnout		2,779	35.77	▼6.48
Rejected ballots		9	0.32	▲0.32
Conservative gain from Liberal Democrats				
Liberal Democrats gain from Conservative				
Conservative gain from Liberal Democrats				

=== Sutton West ===
Sutton West (2)
Party	Candidate	Votes	%	±%
Liberal Democrats	Joan Crowhurst* (Note: Crowhurst was elected in a by-election triggered by the resignation of Cllr Christine Headley in 1996)	960	59.82	▲7.19
Liberal Democrats	Myfanwy Wallace	892		
Conservative	Richard Brown	386	24.81	▲2.11
Conservative	John Rawlinson	382		
Labour	Stephen Baker	157	9.79	▲2.78
Labour	Roy Baker	146		
Green	Eric Hickson	89	5.59	▲2.31
Green	Peter Hickson	84		
Registered electors		4,329		▲8
Turnout		1,594	36.82	▼16.11
Rejected ballots		3	0.19	▲0.15
Liberal Democrats hold				
Liberal Democrats hold				

=== Wallington North ===
Wallington North (3)
Party	Candidate	Votes	%	±%
Liberal Democrats	John Dodwell*	1,252	49.81	▼7.01
Liberal Democrats	John Keys	1,204		
Liberal Democrats	Robert Marvelly	1,092		
Conservative	Howard Bowles	677	27.23	▲2.81
Conservative	Michael Pike	647		
Conservative	Hamish Pollock	616		
Labour	Susan Mansell	420	17.27	▲3.97
Labour	Richard Mackie	413		
Labour	Peter Turner	397		
Green	Bruce Horner	135	5.69	▲0.23
Registered electors		7,483		▲448
Turnout		2,460	32.87	▼17.61
Rejected ballots		8	0.33	▲0.30
Liberal Democrats hold				
Liberal Democrats hold				
Liberal Democrats hold				

=== Wallington South ===
Wallington South (3)
Party	Candidate	Votes	%	±%
Liberal Democrats	Richard Bailey*	1,499	50.70	▼1.58
Liberal Democrats	Colin Hall	1,381		
Liberal Democrats	Stanley Theed*	1,320		
Conservative	Owen Hanson	884	31.38	▲1.41
Conservative	Daniel Hinton	865		
Conservative	Eric Pillinger	850		
Labour	Sean O'Kane	303	10.66	▲0.13
Labour	Louise Risborough	295		
Labour	Jack Stringer	285		
Green	Karin Andrews	150	4.55	▼0.29
Green	Nigel Hamilton	101		
Independent	Danny Blue	75	2.72	New
Registered electors		7,094		▼59
Turnout		2,717	38.30	▼11.69
Rejected ballots		5	0.18	▲0.10
Liberal Democrats hold				
Liberal Democrats hold				
Liberal Democrats hold				

=== Wandle Valley ===
Wandle Valley (2)
Party	Candidate	Votes	%	±%
Liberal Democrats	Sheila Andrews	780	50.47	▼5.77
Liberal Democrats	Margaret Court*	736		
Labour	Ronald Cook	610	38.95	▲4.73
Labour	Margaret Cooper	560		
Conservative	Margaret Clark	170	10.58	▲3.54
Conservative	Beryl Pidgeon	148		
Registered electors		4,929		▲773
Turnout		1,599	32.44	▼20.86
Rejected ballots		7	0.44	▲0.44
Liberal Democrats hold				
Liberal Democrats hold				

=== Woodcote ===
Woodcote (1)
Party	Candidate	Votes	%	±%
Conservative	Graham Whitman*	738	67.33	▲7.93
Liberal Democrats	Duncan Ponikwer	240	21.90	▼9.52
Labour	Ann Poge	118	10.77	▲1.59
Registered electors		2,784		▲74
Turnout		1,092	39.22	▼9.05
Rejected ballots		1	0.09	▲0.09
Conservative hold				

=== Worcester Park North ===
Worcester Park North (3)
Party	Candidate	Votes	%	±%
Liberal Democrats	Leslie Coman	1,122	57.11	▲0.29
Liberal Democrats	Ian Ruxton	1,102		
Liberal Democrats	Peter Overy^{†} (Note: Overy was a sitting councillor representing the Wallington North ward)	1,096		
Conservative	Beryl Moxon	504	24.58	▲0.16
Conservative	Glenys Longhurst	497		
Conservative	Shantina Niles	428		
Labour	Hilary Hosking	370	18.31	▲5.01
Labour	John Evers	360		
Labour	Deborak Stewart	334		
Registered electors		6,909		▼126
Turnout		2,142	31.00	▼19.48
Rejected ballots		7	0.33	▲0.30
Liberal Democrats hold				
Liberal Democrats hold				
Liberal Democrats hold				

=== Worcester Park South ===
Worcester Park South (2)
Party	Candidate	Votes	%	±%
Liberal Democrats	Wendy Bradley	1,014	60.71	▼10.89
Liberal Democrats	Roger Roberts*	999		
Conservative	Janice Elwell	460	26.90	▲6.65
Conservative	Rosamund Williamson	432		
Labour	Catherine Grove	215	12.39	▲4.24
Labour	Alan Mowall	196		
Registered electors		4,605		▲181
Turnout		1,744	37.87	▼15.70
Rejected ballots		9	0.52	▲0.48
Liberal Democrats hold				
Liberal Democrats hold				

=== Wrythe Green ===
Wrythe Green (2)
Party	Candidate	Votes	%	±%
Liberal Democrats	Susan Stears*	838	56.33	▼2.44
Liberal Democrats	Sheila Siggins*	834		
Conservative	Nigel Petre	308	19.24	▲1.30
Labour	Dawn Jennings	300	19.58	▼0.09
Labour	Anthony Thorpe	281		
Conservative	Patricia Yeldham	263		
Green	William Fuller	72	4.85	▼1.23
Registered electors		5,216		▲70
Turnout		1,560	29.91	▼20.36
Rejected ballots		6	0.38	▲0.30
Liberal Democrats hold				
Liberal Democrats hold				
