= Hackbridge (ward) =

Electoral ward in London, England

- Electoral ward for the Sutton London Borough Council
- Borough: London Borough of Sutton
- County: Greater London
- Population: 7,688 (2021)
- Major settlements: Hackbridge
- Area: 1.043 km²

Current electoral ward
- Created: 2022
- Seats: 2

Hackbridge is an electoral ward in the London Borough of Sutton. The ward was first used in the 2022 elections and elects three councillors to Sutton London Borough Council.

== Geography ==
The ward is named after the suburb of Hackbridge.

== Councillors ==
Election	Councillors	
2022	Dave Tchilingirian (Labour)	Sheldon Vestey (Labour)

== Elections ==
=== 2022 ===
Hackbridge (2)
Party	Candidate	Votes	%	±%
Labour	David Tchilingirian	1,029	55.1	
Labour	Sheldon Vestey	951	50.9	
Liberal Democrats	Joanna Sherman	543	29.1	
Liberal Democrats	Alexander Vicente-Machado	494	26.5	
Conservative	David Ruthven-Murray	365	19.5	
Conservative	Emma Scully	353	18.9	
Turnout				
Labour win (new seat)				
Labour win (new seat)				

== See also ==
- List of electoral wards in Greater London
