= 2022 Sutton London Borough Council election =

2022 local election in Sutton

2022 Sutton Council election
- 5 May 2022

All 55 council seats
	First party	Second party
Leader	Ruth Dombey	Tom Drummond
Party	Liberal Democrats	Conservative
Last election	33 seats, 38.8%	18 seats, 36.3%
Seats won	29	20
Seat change	▼4	▲2
Popular vote	65,942	60,217
Percentage	39.6%	36.2%
Swing	▲0.8%	▼0.1%
	Third party	Fourth party
Leader	Sheldon Vestey	Tim Foster
Party	Labour	Independent
Last election	0 seats, 17.8%	3 seats, 2.3%
Seats won	3	3
Seat change	▲3	0
Popular vote	28,170	6,069
Percentage	16.9%	3.6%
Swing	▼0.9%	▲1.3%
- Map of the results
Leader before election
Ruth Dombey
Liberal Democrats
Leader after election
Ruth Dombey
Liberal Democrats

The 2022 Sutton London Borough Council election took place on 5 May 2022. All 55 members of Sutton London Borough Council were elected. The elections took place alongside local elections in the other London boroughs and elections to local authorities across the United Kingdom.

In the previous election in 2018, the Liberal Democrats maintained their longstanding control of the council, winning 33 out of the 54 seats with the Conservative Party forming the principal opposition with eighteen of the remaining 21 seats. The 2022 election took place under new election boundaries, which increased the number of councillors to 55.

== Background ==
=== History ===
Result of the 2018 borough election

The thirty-two London boroughs were established in 1965 by the London Government Act 1963. They are the principal authorities in Greater London and have responsibilities including education, housing, planning, highways, social services, libraries, recreation, waste, environmental health and revenue collection. Some of the powers are shared with the Greater London Authority, which also manages passenger transport, police and fire.

After its formation, Sutton was under Conservative control until 1986. After a brief period of no overall control, the Liberal Democrats gained a majority on the council and have maintained overall control since. In the most recent council election in 2018, the Liberal Democrats won 33 seats with 38.8% of the vote while the Conservatives won 18 seats with 36.3% of the vote across the borough. The remaining three seats were won by independent candidates. One of the independents was a former Liberal Democrat opposed to plans to build an incinerator.

=== Council term ===
A Conservative councillor for Belmont ward, Patrick McManus, resigned in September 2018. The by-election in October 2018 was held for the Conservatives by Neil Garratt, a former councillor and deputy leader of the Conservative group who had lost his seat in the May 2018 council election. The Liberal Democrats came second, reducing the Conservative majority compared to May. Joyce Melican, a Liberal Democrat councillor for Wallington North, resigned in February 2019 for health reasons. She had served as a councillor since 2010. The Liberal Democrat candidate Barry Lewis won the seat in the 29 March 2019 by-election with a reduced majority against the Conservatives.

As with most London boroughs, Sutton were electing its councillors under new boundaries decided by the Local Government Boundary Commission for England, which it produced after a period of consultation. The number of councillors rose from 54 to 55 and the commission produced new boundaries following a period of consultation, with fifteen three-member wards and five two-member wards.

== Electoral process ==
Sutton, like other London borough councils, elects all of its councillors at once every four years. The previous election took place in 2018. The 2022 election took place by multi-member first-past-the-post voting, with each ward being represented by two or three councillors. Electors had as many votes as there are councillors to be elected in their ward, with the top two or three being elected.

All registered electors (British, Irish, Commonwealth and European Union citizens) living in London aged 18 or over were entitled to vote in the election. People who live at two addresses in different councils, such as university students with different term-time and holiday addresses, were entitled to be registered for and vote in elections in both local authorities. Voting in-person at polling stations took place from 7:00 to 22:00 on election day, and voters were able to apply for postal votes or proxy votes in advance of the election.

== Council composition ==
Council composition after the 2018 election

Council composition after the 2022 election

After 2018 election		Before 2022 election		After 2022 election	
Party	Seats	Party	Seats	Party	Seats
Liberal Democrats	33	Liberal Democrats	33	Liberal Democrats	29
Conservative	18	Conservative	18	Conservative	20
Independent	3	Independent	3	Independent	3
Labour	0	Labour	0	Labour	3

== Results summary ==
2022 Sutton London Borough Council election
Party	Seats	Gains	Losses	Net gain/loss	Seats %	Votes %	Votes	+/−
Liberal Democrats	29	2	1	▼4	52.7	39.6	65,942	+0.8
Conservative	20	1	2	▲2	36.4	36.2	60,217	-0.1
Labour	3	0	0	▲3	5.5	16.9	28,170	-0.9
Independent	3	0	0	Steady	5.5	3.6	6,069	+1.3
Green	0	0	0	Steady	0.0	3.6	5,984	+1.1
CPA	0	0	0	Steady	0.0	0.1	132	+0.1
SDP	0	0	0	Steady	0.0	0.0	33	New

== Ward results ==
=== Beddington ===
Beddington (3)
Party	Candidate	Votes	%	±%
Independent	Nicholas Mattey*	1,231	39.7	
Independent	Tim Foster*	1,162	37.5	
Independent	Jillian Green*	1,150	37.1	
Liberal Democrats	Kuhan Nathan	706	22.8	
Conservative	Heather Howell	686	22.1	
Conservative	Julia Russell	619	20.0	
Conservative	Alison Huneke	608	19.6	
Liberal Democrats	Martin Thompson	599	19.3	
Liberal Democrats	Thomas Badham	598	19.3	
Labour	Margaret Hughes	589	19.3	
Labour	John Keys	516	16.6	
Labour	Patricia McCarthy	488	15.7	
Green	Michael Boulton	352	11.3	
Turnout				
Independent win (new seat)				
Independent win (new seat)				
Independent win (new seat)				

=== Belmont ===
Belmont (3)
Party	Candidate	Votes	%	±%
Conservative	David Hicks*	1,537	46.5	
Conservative	Neil Garratt*	1,531	46.3	
Conservative	Jane Pascoe*	1,414	42.8	
Liberal Democrats	Samantha Bourne	1,244	37.6	
Liberal Democrats	Dean Juster	1,182	35.7	
Liberal Democrats	Samuel Weatherlake*	1,005	30.4	
Labour	Gale Blears	586	17.7	
Labour	Alan Aylward	535	16.2	
Labour	Marian Wingrove	474	14.3	
Green	Duncan Lambe	411	12.4	
Turnout				
Conservative hold				
Conservative hold				
Conservative hold				

=== Carshalton Central ===
Carshalton Central (3)
Party	Candidate	Votes	%	±%
Liberal Democrats	Isabel Araujo	2,031	52.4	
Liberal Democrats	Jake Short*	1,906	49.1	
Liberal Democrats	Andrew Jenner	1,688	43.5	
Green	Verity Thomson	1,294	33.4	
Conservative	Melissa Pearce	1,141	29.4	
Conservative	Ethan Smith	1,088	28.0	
Conservative	Gillian Sparks	1,083	27.9	
Labour	Marilynne Burbage	491	12.7	
Labour	Anthony Thorpe	474	12.2	
Labour	Peter Turner	310	8.0	
CPA	Ashley Dickenson	132	3.4	
Turnout				
Liberal Democrats hold				
Liberal Democrats hold				
Liberal Democrats hold				

=== Carshalton South & Clockhouse ===
Carshalton South & Clockhouse (3)
Party	Candidate	Votes	%	±%
Conservative	Moira Butt*	1,698	47.8	
Conservative	Timothy Crowley*	1,669	47.0	
Liberal Democrats	Amy Haldane*	1,617	45.6	
Conservative	Lynne Fletcher	1,544	43.5	
Liberal Democrats	Brendan Hudson	1,523	42.9	
Liberal Democrats	Noormahamod Sumun	1,317	37.1	
Green	Hannah Smith	387	10.9	
Labour	John Clay	329	9.3	
Labour	Michael McLoughlin	286	8.1	
Labour	Roberta Lambert	279	7.9	
Turnout				
Conservative hold				
Conservative hold				
Liberal Democrats hold				

=== Cheam ===
Cheam (3)
Party	Candidate	Votes	%	±%
Conservative	Eric Allen*	1,747	51.7	
Conservative	Tony Shields	1,680	49.7	
Conservative	Vanessa Udall	1,635	48.4	
Liberal Democrats	Alex Chui	1,213	35.9	
Liberal Democrats	Ben Devlin	1,168	34.6	
Liberal Democrats	Harry Legge	1,002	29.7	
Labour	Sarah McGuinness	486	14.4	
Green	John Triggs	466	13.8	
Labour	Simon Muir	373	11.0	
Labour	George Richards	364	10.8	
Turnout				
Conservative hold				
Conservative hold				
Conservative hold				

=== Hackbridge ===
Hackbridge (2)
Party	Candidate	Votes	%	±%
Labour	David Tchilingirian	1,029	55.1	
Labour	Sheldon Vestey	951	50.9	
Liberal Democrats	Joanna Sherman	543	29.1	
Liberal Democrats	Alexander Vicente-Machado	494	26.5	
Conservative	David Ruthven-Murray	365	19.5	
Conservative	Emma Scully	353	18.9	
Turnout				
Labour win (new seat)				
Labour win (new seat)				

=== North Cheam ===
North Cheam (3)
Party	Candidate	Votes	%	±%
Conservative	Michael Dwyer	1,640	47.7	
Conservative	James McDermott-Hill*	1,628	47.4	
Conservative	Paramalingham Vivehanandha	1,600	46.6	
Liberal Democrats	Laura Cooney	1,237	36.0	
Liberal Democrats	Jason Stone	1,167	34.0	
Liberal Democrats	Carl Nichols	1,134	33.0	
Labour	Jane Davies	549	16.0	
Labour	David Owen	453	13.2	
Labour	Raymond Eveleigh	446	13.0	
Green	Christopher Beard	347	10.1	
Independent	Renos Costi	105	3.1	
Turnout				
Conservative win (new seat)				
Conservative win (new seat)				
Conservative win (new seat)				

=== South Beddington & Roundshaw ===
South Beddington & Roundshaw (3)
Party	Candidate	Votes	%	±%
Conservative	Jonathan Pearce	1,232	42.0	
Liberal Democrats	Edward Joyce*	1,201	40.9	
Conservative	Patrick Magnus	1,188	40.5	
Conservative	Ryan Stoneman*	1,183	40.3	
Liberal Democrats	Drew Heffernan*	1,166	39.8	
Liberal Democrats	Srividhya Koteeswaran	1,101	37.5	
Labour	Jacqueline McLoughlin	434	14.8	
Labour	David Towler	377	12.9	
Labour	Kiran Nawaz	372	12.7	
Green	Helene McDonagh	192	6.5	
Independent	Hannah Hamilton	147	5.0	
Independent	Katie Bickel	103	3.5	
Independent	Joseph Prowse	70	2.4	
SDP	Steven Kelleher	33	1.1	
Turnout				
Conservative win (new seat)				
Liberal Democrats win (new seat)				
Conservative win (new seat)				

=== St Helier East ===
St Helier East (2)
Party	Candidate	Votes	%	±%
Liberal Democrats	Paul Cole	643	41.6	
Liberal Democrats	Gemma Munday	631	40.8	
Labour	Sarah Gwynn	499	32.3	
Labour	Grace Platt	439	28.4	
Conservative	Matthew Drew	386	25.0	
Conservative	Ann Page	370	24.0	
Green	Nicola Williams	121	7.8	
Turnout				
Liberal Democrats win (new seat)				
Liberal Democrats win (new seat)				

=== St Helier West ===
St Helier West (3)
Party	Candidate	Votes	%	±%
Labour	Sheila Berry	848	35.5	
Conservative	Steven Alvarez	823	34.5	
Conservative	Wendy Clark	808	33.8	
Labour	Nicholas Diamantis	780	32.7	
Labour	Paul McCarthy	776	32.5	
Conservative	Ethan Windsor	751	31.5	
Liberal Democrats	Omavally Pillay	729	30.5	
Liberal Democrats	Peter Chubb	703	29.4	
Liberal Democrats	Jean Crossby*	702	29.4	
Green	Peter Mead	243	10.2	
Turnout				
Labour win (new seat)				
Conservative win (new seat)				
Conservative win (new seat)				

=== Stonecot ===
Stonecot (2)
Party	Candidate	Votes	%	±%
Liberal Democrats	Robert Beck	996	44.7	
Liberal Democrats	Muttucumaru Sahathevan	936	42.0	
Conservative	Paul Campbell	852	38.2	
Conservative	William Townsend	795	35.7	
Labour	Victoria Richer	440	19.7	
Labour	Victoria Wright	302	13.5	
Green	Karin Jashapara	137	6.1	
Turnout				
Liberal Democrats gain from Conservative				
Liberal Democrats gain from Conservative				

=== Sutton Central ===
Sutton Central (3)
Party	Candidate	Votes	%	±%
Liberal Democrats	David Bartolucci*	1,228	44.7	
Liberal Democrats	Edward Parsley	1,102	40.1	
Liberal Democrats	Cryss Mennaceur	1,038	37.8	
Labour	John McGeachy	858	31.2	
Labour	Kerrie Peak	834	30.3	
Labour	Natalie Wright	816	29.7	
Conservative	Barry Russell	722	26.3	
Conservative	Terence Woods	657	23.9	
Conservative	Venu Sood	643	23.4	
Green	Peter Friel	351	12.8	
Turnout				
Liberal Democrats hold				
Liberal Democrats hold				
Liberal Democrats hold				

=== Sutton North ===
Sutton North (3)
Party	Candidate	Votes	%	±%
Liberal Democrats	Ruth Dombey*	1,343	41.5	
Liberal Democrats	Sam Cumber	1,342	41.5	
Conservative	Bryony Lindsay-Charlton	1,308	40.4	
Conservative	Aamir Haroon	1,263	39.0	
Conservative	Ramachandran Mathanmohan	1,241	38.4	
Liberal Democrats	Christopher Hawton	1,189	36.8	
Labour	Gregory Charles	590	18.2	
Labour	Teresa O'Brien	538	16.6	
Labour	Lyndon Edwards	509	15.7	
Green	Phoebe Connell	380	11.7	
Turnout				
Liberal Democrats hold				
Liberal Democrats hold				
Conservative gain from Liberal Democrats				

=== Sutton South ===
Sutton South (3)
Party	Candidate	Votes	%	±%
Liberal Democrats	Richard Clifton*	1,718	49.4	
Liberal Democrats	Patricia Fivey*	1,691	48.6	
Liberal Democrats	Louise Phelan	1,521	43.7	
Conservative	Chandra Alapati	1,434	41.2	
Conservative	Victoria Shields	1,302	37.4	
Conservative	Arif Syed	1,179	33.9	
Labour	Tessa Cornell	579	16.6	
Labour	Stephen Blears	550	15.8	
Labour	Graham Terrell	461	13.3	
Turnout				
Liberal Democrats hold				
Liberal Democrats hold				
Liberal Democrats gain from Conservative				

=== Sutton West & East Cheam ===
Sutton West & East Cheam (3)
Party	Candidate	Votes	%	±%
Liberal Democrats	Luke Taylor	1,572	47.2	
Liberal Democrats	Christopher Woolmer	1,519	45.6	
Liberal Democrats	Qasim Esak	1,505	45.2	
Conservative	Lily Bande*	1,369	41.1	
Conservative	Catherine Gray*	1,331	40.0	
Conservative	Mukesh Rao	1,266	38.0	
Labour	Nicholas Carter	552	16.6	
Labour	Chibweka Kavindele	452	13.6	
Labour	Carlos Thibaut	427	12.8	
Turnout				
Liberal Democrats win (new seat)				
Liberal Democrats win (new seat)				
Liberal Democrats win (new seat)				

=== The Wrythe ===
The Wrythe (3)
Party	Candidate	Votes	%	±%
Liberal Democrats	Bobby Dean	1,492	47.9	
Liberal Democrats	Colin Stears*	1,337	43.0	
Liberal Democrats	Patrick Ogbonna	1,225	39.4	
Conservative	Edward Dwight*	1,175	37.8	
Conservative	Robert Okpuru	1,138	36.6	
Conservative	Daisy Pearce	1,084	34.8	
Labour	David Grant	534	17.2	
Labour	Margaret Thomas	488	15.7	
Labour	Cecil Tate	468	15.0	
Green	Faye Burnett	394	12.7	
Turnout				
Liberal Democrats hold				
Liberal Democrats hold				
Liberal Democrats hold				

=== Wallington North ===
Wallington North (3)
Party	Candidate	Votes	%	±%
Liberal Democrats	Sunita Gordon*	1,502	45.3	
Liberal Democrats	Marian James*	1,451	43.8	
Liberal Democrats	Barry Lewis*	1,332	40.2	
Conservative	Joel Freeman	785	23.7	
Conservative	Alexander Dabysing	773	23.3	
Conservative	Christopher Wortley	716	21.6	
Independent	Kingsley Hamilton	592	17.9	
Independent	Pamela Marsh	581	17.5	
Independent	Katie Travers	560	16.9	
Labour	Mary Towler	522	15.8	
Labour	Marcia Turner	388	11.7	
Labour	Ahmad Wattoo	375	11.3	
Green	Christopher Donnelly	361	10.9	
Turnout				
Liberal Democrats hold				
Liberal Democrats hold				
Liberal Democrats hold				

=== Wallington South ===
Wallington South (3)
Party	Candidate	Votes	%	±%
Liberal Democrats	Jayne McCoy*	1,830	56.0	
Liberal Democrats	Samuel Martin	1,728	52.9	
Liberal Democrats	Muhammad Sadiq*	1,585	48.5	
Conservative	Malcolm Brown	916	28.0	
Conservative	Martin Simms	838	25.7	
Conservative	Hilary Wortley	804	24.6	
Labour	Eliot Carroll	584	17.9	
Labour	Kausar Kamran	444	13.6	
Labour	Maximillian Whelton	389	11.9	
Green	Maeve Tomlinson	314	9.6	
Independent	Daryl Gardner	188	5.8	
Independent	Geoffrey Stone	97	3.0	
Independent	David Wightwick	83	2.5	
Turnout				
Liberal Democrats hold				
Liberal Democrats hold				
Liberal Democrats hold				

=== Worcester Park North ===
Worcester Park North (2)
Party	Candidate	Votes	%	±%
Conservative	Thomas Drummond*	1,233	47.0	
Conservative	Joe Quick	1,086	41.4	
Liberal Democrats	Jenny Batt*	919	35.0	
Liberal Democrats	James Appleby	877	33.4	
Labour	Elizabeth Martin	515	19.6	
Labour	Mehdi Kabash	380	14.5	
Green	Virginia Boyd	234	8.9	
Turnout				
Conservative win (new seat)				
Conservative win (new seat)				

=== Worcester Park South ===
Worcester Park South (2)
Party	Candidate	Votes	%	±%
Conservative	Martina Allen*	1,191	51.4	
Conservative	Peter Geiringer*	1,109	47.8	
Liberal Democrats	Lauren Fivey	831	35.8	
Liberal Democrats	Barry Reed	764	33.0	
Labour	John Flowers	372	16.0	
Labour	Ann Morrison	370	16.0	
Turnout				
Conservative win (new seat)				
Conservative win (new seat)				

== By-elections ==
=== St Helier West ===
St Helier West by-election, 2 May 2024
Party	Candidate	Votes	%	±%
Conservative	Catherine Gray	1,342	35.4	▼3.9
Liberal Democrats	Noor Sumun	1,336	35.3	▲4.8
Labour	Margaret Thomas	682	18.0	▼17.5
Independent Activist	Kingsley Hamilton	367	9.7	N/A
Independent	Renos Costi	62	1.6	N/A
Majority		6	0.1	N/A
Turnout		3,825		
Conservative gain from Labour		Swing		

=== Sutton Central ===
Sutton Central by-election: 10 April 2025
Party	Candidate	Votes	%	±%
Liberal Democrats	Richard Choi	1,291	55.7	▲16.8
Conservative	Maria Arif	327	14.1	▼8.8
Reform	Joanna Bishop	282	12.2	N/A
Labour	Kerrie Peek	216	9.3	▼17.9
Green	Peter Friel	95	4.1	▼7.0
Independent	Pamela Marsh	84	3.6	N/A
CPA	Ashley Dickenson	24	1.0	N/A
Majority		964	41.6	N/A
Turnout		2,319		
Liberal Democrats hold		Swing	▲12.8	

=== Carshalton South & Clockhouse ===
Carshalton South & Clockhouse by-election: 22 May 2025
Party	Candidate	Votes	%	±%
Liberal Democrats	Lisa Webster	1,674	52.2	▲12.1
Conservative	Christopher De Cruz	767	23.9	▼18.2
Reform	Arlene Dearlove	573	17.9	N/A
Labour	John Keys	89	2.8	▼5.4
Green	Peter Friel	79	2.5	▼7.1
CPA	Ashley Dickenson	23	0.7	N/A
Majority		907	28.3	
Turnout		3,205		
Liberal Democrats hold		Swing		
