= Sutton West and East Cheam =

Electoral ward in London, England

- Electoral ward for the Sutton London Borough Council
- Borough: London Borough of Sutton
- County: Greater London
- Population: 10,907 (2021)
- Major settlements: Sutton, Cheam
- Area: 1.656 km²

Current electoral ward
- Created: 2022
- Seats: 3
- Created from: Sutton West

Sutton West and East Cheam is an electoral ward in the London Borough of Sutton. The ward was first used in the 2022 elections and elects three councillors to Sutton London Borough Council.

== Geography ==
The ward is named after the town of Sutton and the suburb of Cheam.

== Councillors ==
Election	Councillors		
2022	Luke Taylor (Liberal Democrats)	Christopher Woolmer (Liberal Democrats)	Qasim Esak (Liberal Democrats)

== Elections ==
=== 2022 ===
Sutton West & East Cheam (3)
Party	Candidate	Votes	%	±%
Liberal Democrats	Luke Taylor	1,572	47.2	
Liberal Democrats	Christopher Woolmer	1,519	45.6	
Liberal Democrats	Qasim Esak	1,505	45.2	
Conservative	Lily Bande*	1,369	41.1	
Conservative	Catherine Gray*	1,331	40.0	
Conservative	Mukesh Rao	1,266	38.0	
Labour	Nicholas Carter	552	16.6	
Labour	Chibweka Kavindele	452	13.6	
Labour	Carlos Thibaut	427	12.8	
Turnout				
Liberal Democrats win (new seat)				
Liberal Democrats win (new seat)				
Liberal Democrats win (new seat)				

== See also ==
- List of electoral wards in Greater London
