= Beddington (ward) =

Electoral ward in London, England

- Electoral ward for the Sutton London Borough Council
- Borough: London Borough of Sutton
- County: Greater London
- Population: 11,230 (2021)
- Major settlements: Beddington
- Area: 5.056 km²

Current electoral ward
- Created: 2022
- Seats: 3
- Created from: Beddington North, Beddington South

Beddington is an electoral ward in the London Borough of Sutton. The ward was first used in the 2022 elections and elects three councillors to Sutton London Borough Council.

== Geography ==
The ward is named after the suburb of Beddington.

== Councillors ==
Election	Councillors		
2022	Nicholas Mattey (Independent)	Tim Foster (Independent)	Jillian Green (Independent)

== Elections ==
=== 2022 ===
Beddington (3)
Party	Candidate	Votes	%	±%
Independent	Nicholas Mattey*	1,231	39.7	
Independent	Tim Foster*	1,162	37.5	
Independent	Jillian Green*	1,150	37.1	
Liberal Democrats	Kuhan Nathan	706	22.8	
Conservative	Heather Howell	686	22.1	
Conservative	Julia Russell	619	20.0	
Conservative	Alison Huneke	608	19.6	
Liberal Democrats	Martin Thompson	599	19.3	
Liberal Democrats	Thomas Badham	598	19.3	
Labour	Margaret Hughes	589	19.3	
Labour	John Keys	516	16.6	
Labour	Patricia McCarthy	488	15.7	
Green	Michael Boulton	352	11.3	
Turnout				
Independent win (new seat)				
Independent win (new seat)				
Independent win (new seat)				

== See also ==
- List of electoral wards in Greater London
