= Stonecot (ward) =

Electoral ward in London, England

- Electoral ward for the Sutton London Borough Council
- Borough: London Borough of Sutton
- County: Greater London
- Population: 8,279 (2021)
- Major settlements: Carshalton
- Area: 1.619 km²

Current electoral ward
- Created: 2002
- Seats: 2 (since 2002); 3 (until 2002)

Stonecot is an electoral ward in the London Borough of Sutton. The ward was first used in the 2002 elections and elects two councillors to Sutton London Borough Council.

== Geography ==
The ward is named after Stonecot Hill in Sutton.

== Councillors ==
Election	Councillors	
2022	Robert Beck (Liberal Democrats)	Cumar Sahathevan (Liberal Democrats)

== Elections ==
=== 2022 ===
Stonecot (2)
Party	Candidate	Votes	%	±%
Liberal Democrats	Robert Beck	996	44.7	
Liberal Democrats	Muttucumaru Sahathevan	936	42.0	
Conservative	Paul Campbell	852	38.2	
Conservative	William Townsend	795	35.7	
Labour	Victoria Richer	440	19.7	
Labour	Victoria Wright	302	13.5	
Green	Karin Jashapara	137	6.1	
Turnout				
Liberal Democrats gain from Conservative				
Liberal Democrats gain from Conservative				

== See also ==
- List of electoral wards in Greater London
