= Sutton North =

Electoral ward in London, England

- Electoral ward for the Sutton London Borough Council
- Borough: London Borough of Sutton
- County: Greater London
- Population: 11,296 (2021)
- Major settlements: Sutton, London
- Area: 1.876 km²

Current electoral ward
- Created: 2002
- Seats: 3 (since 2002); 2 (until 2002)

Sutton North is an electoral ward in the London Borough of Sutton. The ward was first used in the 2002 elections and elects three councillors to Sutton London Borough Council. A ward of the same name was previously in use from 1964 to 1968.

== Geography ==
The ward is named after the town of Sutton, London.

== Councillors ==
Election	Councillors		
2022	Sam Cumber (Liberal Democrats)	Ruth Dombey (Liberal Democrats)	Bryony Lindsay-Charlton (Conservative)

== Elections ==
=== 2022 ===
Sutton North (3)
Party	Candidate	Votes	%	±%
Liberal Democrats	Ruth Dombey*	1,343	41.5	
Liberal Democrats	Sam Cumber	1,342	41.5	
Conservative	Bryony Lindsay-Charlton	1,308	40.4	
Conservative	Aamir Haroon	1,263	39.0	
Conservative	Ramachandran Mathanmohan	1,241	38.4	
Liberal Democrats	Christopher Hawton	1,189	36.8	
Labour	Gregory Charles	590	18.2	
Labour	Teresa O'Brien	538	16.6	
Labour	Lyndon Edwards	509	15.7	
Green	Phoebe Connell	380	11.7	
Turnout				
Liberal Democrats hold				
Liberal Democrats hold				
Conservative gain from Liberal Democrats				

== See also ==
- List of electoral wards in Greater London
