= Sutton Central =

British electoral district

- Electoral ward for the Sutton London Borough Council
- Sutton Central ward boundaries since 2022
- Borough: Sutton
- County: Greater London
- Population: 12,566 (2021) (Note: 2021 Census data reported for 2022 ward boundaries)
- Electorate: 8,471 (2022)
- Area: 1.093 square kilometres (0.422 sq mi)

Current electoral ward
- Created: 1965
- Number of members: 1965–2002: 2; 2002–present: 3
- Councillors: Edward Parsley; Cryss Mennaceur; Richard Choi
- GSS code: E05000564 (2002–2022); E05013765 (2022–present)

Sutton Central is an electoral ward in the London Borough of Sutton. The ward has existed since the creation of the borough on 1 April 1965 and was first used in the 1964 elections. It returns councillors to Sutton London Borough Council.

== Sutton council elections since 2022 ==
There was a revision of ward boundaries in Sutton in 2022.

=== 2025 by-election ===
The by-election took place on 10 April 2025, following the resignation of David Bartolucci.

2025 Sutton Central by-election
| Party | Candidate | Votes | % | ±% |
|---|---|---|---|---|
| Liberal Democrats | Richard Choi | 1,291 | 55.67 | |
| Conservative | Maria Arif | 327 | 14.10 | |
| Reform | Joanna Bishop | 282 | 12.16 | |
| Labour | Kerrie Peek | 216 | 9.31 | |
| Green | Peter Friel | 95 | 4.09 | |
| Independent | Pamela Marsh | 84 | 3.62 | |
| CPA | Ashley Dickenson | 24 | 1.03 | |
| Turnout | | 2,319 | 26.83 | |
| Liberal Democrats hold | | Swing | | |

=== 2022 election ===
The election took place on 5 May 2022.

2022 Sutton London Borough Council election: Sutton Central
| Party | Candidate | Votes | % | ±% |
|---|---|---|---|---|
| Liberal Democrats | David Bartolucci | 1,228 | 44.7 | |
| Liberal Democrats | Edward Parsley | 1,102 | 40.1 | |
| Liberal Democrats | Cryss Mennaceur | 1,038 | 37.8 | |
| Labour | John McGeachy | 858 | 31.2 | |
| Labour | Kerrie Peak | 834 | 30.3 | |
| Labour | Natalie Wright | 816 | 29.7 | |
| Conservative | Barry Russell | 722 | 26.3 | |
| Conservative | Terence Woods | 657 | 23.9 | |
| Conservative | Venu Sood | 643 | 23.4 | |
| Green | Peter Friel | 351 | 12.8 | |
| Turnout | | | | |
| Liberal Democrats win (new boundaries) | | | | |
| Liberal Democrats win (new boundaries) | | | | |
| Liberal Democrats win (new boundaries) | | | | |

== 2002–2022 Sutton council elections ==
Sutton Central ward boundaries from 2002 to 2022

There was a revision of ward boundaries in Sutton in 2002.

=== 2018 election ===
The election took place on 3 May 2018.

2018 Sutton London Borough Council election: Sutton Central
| Party | Candidate | Votes | % | ±% |
|---|---|---|---|---|
| Liberal Democrats | David Bartolucci | 1,259 | 40.3 | −6.5 |
| Liberal Democrats | Rich Clare | 1,236 | 39.6 | −3.5 |
| Liberal Democrats | Ali Mirhashem | 1,114 | 35.7 | −2.0 |
| Labour | Steve Adams | 1,082 | 34.6 | +13.7 |
| Labour | Bonnie Craven | 961 | 30.8 | +13.4 |
| Labour | Vic Paulino | 905 | 29.0 | +13.8 |
| Conservative | Nigel Cornwell | 789 | 25.3 | +10.7 |
| Conservative | Marie Grant | 756 | 24.2 | +11.2 |
| Conservative | Alan Plant | 727 | 23.3 | +5.5 |
| Green | Peter Friel | 293 | 9.4 | −2.3 |
| UKIP | Jess Beadle | 154 | 4.9 | −13.6 |
| UKIP | Charlie Wood | 112 | 3.6 | N/A |
| Rejected ballots | | 8 | | |
| Turnout | | 3,132 | 33.69 | |
| Liberal Democrats hold | | Swing | | |
| Liberal Democrats hold | | Swing | | |
| Liberal Democrats hold | | Swing | | |

=== 2014 election ===
The election took place on 22 May 2014.

2014 Sutton London Borough Council election: Sutton Central
| Party | Candidate | Votes | % | ±% |
|---|---|---|---|---|
| Liberal Democrats | David Bartolucci | 1,480 | 46.8 | |
| Liberal Democrats | Vincent Galligan | 1,365 | 43.1 | |
| Liberal Democrats | Ali Mirhashem | 1,192 | 37.7 | |
| Labour | Emily Brothers | 662 | 20.9 | |
| UKIP | Jake Grogan | 584 | 18.5 | |
| Conservative | Charles Cornwell | 563 | 17.8 | |
| Labour | Charles Mansell | 550 | 17.4 | |
| Labour | Vic Paulino | 480 | 15.2 | |
| Conservative | Nigel Cornwell | 463 | 14.6 | |
| Conservative | Marie Grant | 412 | 13.0 | |
| Green | Simon Honey | 369 | 11.7 | |
| TUSC | Pauline Gorman | 90 | 2.8 | |
| Turnout | | 3,164 | 38.5 | −26.2 |
| Liberal Democrats hold | | Swing | | |
| Liberal Democrats hold | | Swing | | |
| Liberal Democrats hold | | Swing | | |

=== 2010 election ===
The election on 6 May 2010 took place on the same day as the United Kingdom general election.

2010 Sutton London Borough Council election: Sutton Central
| Party | Candidate | Votes | % | ±% |
|---|---|---|---|---|
| Liberal Democrats | Sean Brennan | 2,660 | | |
| Liberal Democrats | Janet Lowne | 2,275 | | |
| Liberal Democrats | Graham Tope | 2,160 | | |
| Conservative | Alexandra Churchill | 1,393 | | |
| Conservative | Andrew Pearce | 1,326 | | |
| Conservative | Uday Kalangi | 1,060 | | |
| Labour | Kathy Allen | 804 | | |
| Labour | Charlie Mansell | 544 | | |
| Labour | Vic Paulino | 456 | | |
| Green | Simon Honey | 419 | | |
| Turnout | | | | |
| Liberal Democrats hold | | Swing | | |
| Liberal Democrats hold | | Swing | | |
| Liberal Democrats hold | | Swing | | |

=== 2006 election ===
The election took place on 4 May 2006.

2006 Sutton London Borough Council election: Sutton Central
| Party | Candidate | Votes | % | ±% |
|---|---|---|---|---|
| Liberal Democrats | John Brennan | 1,371 | 54.7 | |
| Liberal Democrats | Janet Lowne | 1,340 | | |
| Liberal Democrats | Graham Tope | 1,340 | | |
| Conservative | Elizabeth Fison | 681 | 27.2 | |
| Conservative | Margaret Greenwood | 668 | | |
| Conservative | Christine Hicks | 648 | | |
| Labour | Kathleen Allen | 454 | 18.1 | |
| Labour | Maria Ponto | 422 | | |
| Labour | Enid Bakewell | 397 | | |
| Turnout | | | 36.5 | |
| Liberal Democrats hold | | Swing | | |
| Liberal Democrats hold | | Swing | | |
| Liberal Democrats hold | | Swing | | |

=== 2002 election ===
The election took place on 2 May 2002.

2002 Sutton London Borough Council election: Sutton Central
| Party | Candidate | Votes | % | ±% |
|---|---|---|---|---|
| Liberal Democrats | John Brennan | 1,010 | | |
| Liberal Democrats | Janet Lowne | 983 | | |
| Liberal Democrats | Graham Tope | 948 | | |
| Labour | Kathleen Allen | 751 | | |
| Labour | Gale Blears | 695 | | |
| Labour | John Morgan | 664 | | |
| Conservative | Stewart England | 477 | | |
| Conservative | Annabel Wells | 460 | | |
| Conservative | Lynne Isaby | 450 | | |
| Green | Margaret Williams | 192 | | |
| Turnout | | | | |
| Liberal Democrats win (new boundaries) | | | | |
| Liberal Democrats win (new boundaries) | | | | |
| Liberal Democrats win (new boundaries) | | | | |
