= Wallington North =

Electoral ward in London, England

- Electoral ward for the Sutton London Borough Council
- Borough: London Borough of Sutton
- County: Greater London
- Population: 12,236 (2021)
- Major settlements: Wallington, London
- Area: 1.645 km²

Current electoral ward
- Created: 1965
- Seats: 3 (since 1978); 2 (until 1978)

Wallington North is an electoral ward in the London Borough of Sutton. The ward was first used in the 1964 elections and elects three councillors to Sutton London Borough Council.

== Geography ==
The ward is named after the town of Wallington, London.

== Councillors ==
Election	Councillors		
2022	Sunita Gordon (Liberal Democrats)	Marian James (Liberal Democrats)	Barry Lewis (Liberal Democrats)

== Elections ==
=== 2022 ===
Wallington North (3)
Party	Candidate	Votes	%	±%
Liberal Democrats	Sunita Gordon*	1,502	45.3	
Liberal Democrats	Marian James*	1,451	43.8	
Liberal Democrats	Barry Lewis*	1,332	40.2	
Conservative	Joel Freeman	785	23.7	
Conservative	Alexander Dabysing	773	23.3	
Conservative	Christopher Wortley	716	21.6	
Independent	Kingsley Hamilton	592	17.9	
Independent	Pamela Marsh	581	17.5	
Independent	Katie Travers	560	16.9	
Labour	Mary Towler	522	15.8	
Labour	Marcia Turner	388	11.7	
Labour	Ahmad Wattoo	375	11.3	
Green	Christopher Donnelly	361	10.9	
Turnout				
Liberal Democrats hold				
Liberal Democrats hold				
Liberal Democrats hold				

== See also ==
- List of electoral wards in Greater London
