= Wallington South =

Electoral ward in London, England

- Electoral ward for the Sutton London Borough Council
- Borough: London Borough of Sutton
- County: Greater London
- Population: 11,049 (2021)
- Major settlements: Wallington, London
- Area: 1.720 km²

Current electoral ward
- Created: 1965
- Seats: 3 (since 1978); 2 (until 1978)

Wallington South is an electoral ward in the London Borough of Sutton. The ward was first used in the 1964 elections and elects three councillors to Sutton London Borough Council.

== Geography ==
The ward is named after the town of Wallington, London.

== Councillors ==
Election	Councillors		
2022	Jayne McCoy (Liberal Democrats)	Samuel Martin (Liberal Democrats)	Muhammad Sadiq (Liberal Democrats)

== Elections ==
=== 2022 ===
Wallington South (3)
Party	Candidate	Votes	%	±%
Liberal Democrats	Jayne McCoy*	1,830	56.0	
Liberal Democrats	Samuel Martin	1,728	52.9	
Liberal Democrats	Muhammad Sadiq*	1,585	48.5	
Conservative	Malcolm Brown	916	28.0	
Conservative	Martin Simms	838	25.7	
Conservative	Hilary Wortley	804	24.6	
Labour	Eliot Carroll	584	17.9	
Labour	Kausar Kamran	444	13.6	
Labour	Maximillian Whelton	389	11.9	
Green	Maeve Tomlinson	314	9.6	
Independent	Daryl Gardner	188	5.8	
Independent	Geoffrey Stone	97	3.0	
Independent	David Wightwick	83	2.5	
Turnout				
Liberal Democrats hold				
Liberal Democrats hold				
Liberal Democrats hold				

== See also ==
- List of electoral wards in Greater London
