= Carshalton Central =

Electoral ward in London, England

- Electoral ward for the Sutton London Borough Council
- Borough: London Borough of Sutton
- County: Greater London
- Population: 11,776 (2021)
- Major settlements: Carshalton
- Area: 2.178 km²

Current electoral ward
- Created: 1965
- Seats: 3 (since 2002); 2 (until 2002)

Carshalton Central is an electoral ward in the London Borough of Sutton. The ward was first used in the 1964 elections and elects three councillors to Sutton London Borough Council.

== Geography ==
The ward is named after the suburb of Carshalton.

== Councillors ==
Election	Councillors		
2022	Isabel Araujo (Liberal Democrats)	Jake Short (Liberal Democrats)	Andrew Jenner (Liberal Democrats)

== Elections ==
=== 2022 ===
Carshalton Central (3)
Party	Candidate	Votes	%	±%
Liberal Democrats	Isabel Araujo	2,031	52.4	
Liberal Democrats	Jake Short*	1,906	49.1	
Liberal Democrats	Andrew Jenner	1,688	43.5	
Green	Verity Thomson	1,294	33.4	
Conservative	Melissa Pearce	1,141	29.4	
Conservative	Ethan Smith	1,088	28.0	
Conservative	Gillian Sparks	1,083	27.9	
Labour	Marilynne Burbage	491	12.7	
Labour	Anthony Thorpe	474	12.2	
Labour	Peter Turner	310	8.0	
CPA	Ashley Dickenson	132	3.4	
Turnout				
Liberal Democrats hold				
Liberal Democrats hold				
Liberal Democrats hold				

== See also ==
- List of electoral wards in Greater London
