= North Cheam (ward) =

Electoral ward in London, England

- Electoral ward for the Sutton London Borough Council
- Borough: London Borough of Sutton
- County: Greater London
- Population: 11,452 (2021)
- Major settlements: North Cheam
- Area: 1.591 km²

Current electoral ward
- Created: 2022
- Seats: 3

North Cheam is an electoral ward in the London Borough of Sutton. The ward was first used in the 2022 elections and elects three councillors to Sutton London Borough Council.

== Geography ==
The ward is named after the suburb of North Cheam.

== Councillors ==
Election	Councillors		
2022	Michael Dwyer (Conservative)	James McDermott-Hill (Conservative)	Param Nandha (Conservative)

== Elections ==
=== 2022 ===
North Cheam (3)
Party	Candidate	Votes	%	±%
Conservative	Michael Dwyer	1,640	47.7	
Conservative	James McDermott-Hill*	1,628	47.4	
Conservative	Paramalingham Vivehanandha	1,600	46.6	
Liberal Democrats	Laura Cooney	1,237	36.0	
Liberal Democrats	Jason Stone	1,167	34.0	
Liberal Democrats	Carl Nichols	1,134	33.0	
Labour	Jane Davies	549	16.0	
Labour	David Owen	453	13.2	
Labour	Raymond Eveleigh	446	13.0	
Green	Christopher Beard	347	10.1	
Independent	Renos Costi	105	3.1	
Turnout				
Conservative win (new seat)				
Conservative win (new seat)				
Conservative win (new seat)				

== See also ==
- List of electoral wards in Greater London
