= Sutton South =

Electoral ward in London, England

- Electoral ward for the Sutton London Borough Council
- Borough: London Borough of Sutton
- County: Greater London
- Population: 12,697 (2021)
- Major settlements: Sutton, London
- Area: 1.390 km²

Current electoral ward
- Created: 1965
- Seats: 3 (since 1978); 2 (until 1978)

Sutton South is an electoral ward in the London Borough of Sutton. The ward was first used in the 1964 elections and elects three councillors to Sutton London Borough Council.

== Geography ==
The ward is named after the town of Sutton, London.

== Councillors ==
Election	Councillors		
2022	Richard Clifton (Liberal Democrats)	Patricia Fivey (Liberal Democrats)	Louise Phelan (Liberal Democrats)

== Elections ==
=== 2022 ===
Sutton South (3)
Party	Candidate	Votes	%	±%
Liberal Democrats	Richard Clifton*	1,718	49.4	
Liberal Democrats	Patricia Fivey*	1,691	48.6	
Liberal Democrats	Louise Phelan	1,521	43.7	
Conservative	Chandra Alapati	1,434	41.2	
Conservative	Victoria Shields	1,302	37.4	
Conservative	Arif Syed	1,179	33.9	
Labour	Tessa Cornell	579	16.6	
Labour	Stephen Blears	550	15.8	
Labour	Graham Terrell	461	13.3	
Turnout				
Liberal Democrats hold				
Liberal Democrats hold				
Liberal Democrats gain from Conservative				

== See also ==
- List of electoral wards in Greater London
