= Carshalton and Wallington =

UK Parliament constituency (since 1983)

Coordinates: 51.360°N 0.150°W

- Borough constituency for the House of Commons
- Interactive map of boundaries from 2024
- County: Greater London
- Population: 105,100 (2022)
- Electorate: 72,755 (March 2020)
- Major settlements: Beddington, Carshalton and Wallington

Current constituency
- Created: 1983
- Member of Parliament: Bobby Dean (Liberal Democrats)
- Seats: One
- Created from: Carshalton

Carshalton and Wallington (Note: /kɑːrˈʃɔːltən.əndˈwɒlɪŋtən/ (hover over for phonetic character guide)) is a constituency in Greater London represented in the House of Commons of the UK Parliament since 2024 by Bobby Dean, a Liberal Democrat.

The seat was created at the 1983 general election, replacing the former seat of Carshalton.

== Constituency profile ==
Carshalton and Wallington is a suburban constituency located in the Borough of Sutton on the outskirts of Greater London. It includes the connected towns of Carshalton and Wallington. Like much of suburban London, the area was rural in character until the arrival of rail transport in the mid 19th century.

Residents' household income is higher than the national average and in line with the rest of London. Residents have average levels of education and professional employment. The constituency is mostly affluent but contains some neighbourhoods with high deprivation like St Helier and Roundshaw. White people make up 69% of the population with Asians being the largest ethnic minority group at 16%. The area has one of the country's largest Filipino communities. At the local borough council, most of the constituency is represented by Liberal Democrats with some Labour Party and independent councillors in the north and Conservatives in the south. Unlike most of London, voters in the constituency supported leaving the European Union in the 2016 referendum, with an estimated 56% voting in favour of Brexit.

== Boundaries and boundary changes ==
Dates	Local authority	Maps	Wards
1983–2010	London Borough of Sutton		Beddington North, Beddington South, Carshalton Beeches, Carshalton Central, Carshalton North, Clockhouse, St Helier North, St Helier South, Wallington North, Wallington South, Wandle Valley, Woodcote, and Wrythe Green.
2010–2024	London Borough of Sutton		Beddington North, Beddington South, Carshalton Central, Carshalton South and Clockhouse, St Helier, The Wrythe, Wallington North, Wallington South, and Wandle Valley.
2024–present	London Borough of Sutton		Beddington; Carshalton Central; Carshalton South & Clockhouse; Hackbridge; St. Helier East; St. Helier West; South Beddington & Roundshaw; The Wrythe; Wallington North; and Wallington South.

=== 1983–2010 ===
The constituency was formed entirely from the renaming of the constituency of Carshalton

=== 2010–2024 ===
Minor ward boundary changes and renaming

=== 2024–present ===
Wards renamed

== Political history ==
Results of all deposit-keeping candidates in their bid be the MP for Carshalton and Wallington (UK House of Commons) from 1983 to 2019. The first two LD results refer to the SDP.

The seat was created in 1983, replacing the former constituency of Carshalton, which had voted Conservative at every election since its creation in 1945. The new Carshalton and Wallington initially followed suit as a safe Conservative seat, being won by the party by a wide margin (ranging from 18.8% to 28.7%) at each of the first three general elections of its existence.

However, the large national swing against the Conservatives in 1997 saw the seat gained by the Liberal Democrat Tom Brake by a decisive margin of 11.2%.

Brake would hold the seat for the next 22 years, being one of just eight Liberal Democrat MPs to survive the party's near-wipeout at the 2015 United Kingdom general election - Carshalton and Wallington was one of just two seats in the southern half of England, the other being North Norfolk to be retained by the party that year.

After narrowly holding on to the seat for the Liberal Democrats in both 2015 and 2017, Brake was defeated by the Conservative Elliot Colburn by just 629 votes at the 2019. Brake had been the party spokesman on Brexit. The Liberal Democrats fiercely campaigned against Brexit; however, this seat voted to leave in the 2016 referendum.

The Liberal Democrats regained the seat at the 2024 general election by a margin of 16.9% – their largest ever majority in the constituency.

Demographically this zone of London has little social housing and much of the housing, overwhelmingly semi-detached or detached, is to some extent considered to be in the stockbroker belt; some of the south of the seat has fine views from the slopes of the Downs and many small parks and recreation grounds characterise the district.

== Members of Parliament ==
Election	Member	Party	Notes
1983	Nigel Forman	Conservative	Member for Carshalton (1974–1983)
1997	Tom Brake	Liberal Democrats	Deputy Leader of the House of Commons (2012–2015); Chief Whip of the Liberal Democrats (2015–2017)
2019	Elliot Colburn	Conservative	
2024	Bobby Dean	Liberal Democrats	

== Election results ==
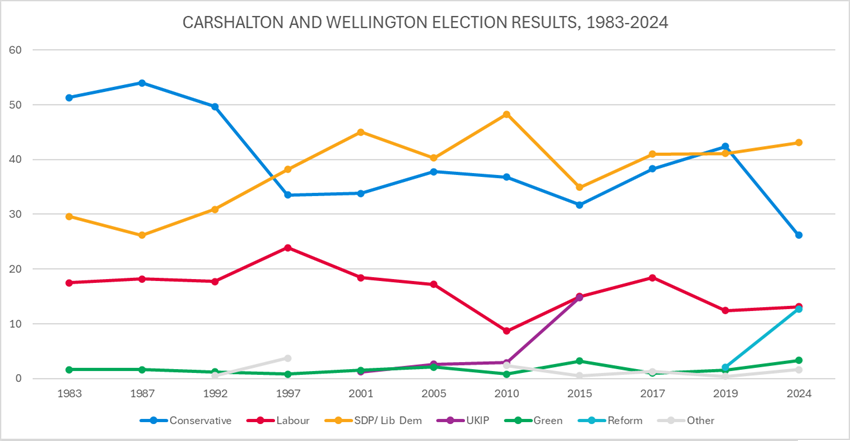
Election results 1983-2024

=== Elections in the 2020s ===
General election 2024: Carshalton and Wallington
Party	Candidate	Votes	%	±%
Liberal Democrats	Bobby Dean	20,126	43.1	+2.0
Conservative	Elliot Colburn	12,221	26.2	−16.2
Labour	Hersh Thaker	6,108	13.1	+0.7
Reform	Elizabeth Cooper	5,941	12.7	+10.6
Green	Tracey Hague	1,517	3.3	+1.8
Workers Party	Atif Rashid	441	0.9	N/A
CPA	Ashley Dickenson	231	0.5	+0.1
SDP	Steve Kelleher	85	0.2	N/A
Majority		7,905	16.9	N/A
Turnout		46,670	62.8	−4.5
Registered electors		74,362		
Liberal Democrats gain from Conservative		Swing	+9.1	

=== Elections in the 2010s ===
General election 2019: Carshalton and Wallington
Party	Candidate	Votes	%	±%
Conservative	Elliot Colburn	20,822	42.4	+4.1
Liberal Democrats	Tom Brake	20,193	41.1	+0.1
Labour	Ahmad Wattoo	6,081	12.4	−6.0
Brexit Party	James Woudhuysen	1,043	2.1	N/A
Green	Tracey Hague	759	1.5	+0.5
CPA	Ashley Dickenson	200	0.4	0.0
Majority		629	1.3	N/A
Turnout		49,098	67.3	−4.3
Registered electors		72,926		
Conservative gain from Liberal Democrats		Swing	+2.0	

General election 2017: Carshalton and Wallington
Party	Candidate	Votes	%	±%
Liberal Democrats	Tom Brake	20,819	41.0	+6.1
Conservative	Matthew Maxwell-Scott	19,450	38.3	+6.6
Labour	Emine Ibrahim	9,360	18.4	+3.4
Green	Shasha Khan	501	1.0	−2.2
Independent	Nick Mattey	434	0.9	N/A
CPA	Ashley Dickenson	189	0.4	0.0
Majority		1,369	2.7	−0.5
Turnout		50,753	71.6	+3.6
Registered electors		70,849		
Liberal Democrats hold		Swing	−0.3	

General election 2015: Carshalton and Wallington
Party	Candidate	Votes	%	±%
Liberal Democrats	Tom Brake	16,603	34.9	−13.4
Conservative	Matthew Maxwell-Scott	15,093	31.7	−5.1
Labour	Siobhan Tate	7,150	15.0	+6.3
UKIP	William Main-Ian	7,049	14.8	+11.9
Green	Ross Hemingway	1,492	3.2	+2.4
CPA	Ashley Dickenson	177	0.4	N/A
National Front	Richard Edmonds	49	0.1	N/A
Majority		1,510	3.2	−8.3
Turnout		47,613	68.0	−1.0
Registered electors		69,981		
Liberal Democrats hold		Swing	−4.3	

General election 2010: Carshalton and Wallington
Party	Candidate	Votes	%	±%
Liberal Democrats	Tom Brake	22,180	48.3	+7.8
Conservative	Kenneth Andrew	16,920	36.8	−0.7
Labour	Shafi Khan	4,015	8.7	−8.6
UKIP	Frank Day	1,348	2.9	+0.3
BNP	Charlotte Lewis	1,100	2.4	N/A
Green	George Dow	355	0.8	−1.3
Majority		5,260	11.5	+8.5
Turnout		45,918	69.0	+5.5
Registered electors		66,524		
Liberal Democrats hold		Swing	+4.3	

=== Elections in the 2000s ===
2005 notional result
Party	Vote	%
Liberal Democrats	15,684	40.5
Conservative	16,919	37.5
Labour	7,236	17.3
Others	1,966	4.7
Turnout	41,805	63.5
Electorate	65,858	

General election 2005: Carshalton and Wallington
Party	Candidate	Votes	%	±%
Liberal Democrats	Tom Brake	17,357	40.3	−4.7
Conservative	Kenneth Andrew	16,289	37.8	+4.0
Labour	Andrew Theobald	7,396	17.2	−1.2
UKIP	Francis Day	1,111	2.6	+1.4
Green	Robert Steel	908	2.1	+0.6
Majority		1,068	2.5	−8.7
Turnout		43,061	63.5	+3.2
Registered electors		67,243		
Liberal Democrats hold		Swing	−4.4	

General election 2001: Carshalton and Wallington
Party	Candidate	Votes	%	±%
Liberal Democrats	Tom Brake	18,289	45.0	+6.8
Conservative	Kenneth Andrew	13,742	33.8	+0.3
Labour	Margaret Cooper	7,466	18.4	−5.5
Green	Simon Dixon	614	1.5	+0.7
UKIP	Martin Haley	501	1.2	+0.7
Majority		4,547	11.2	+6.5
Turnout		40,612	60.3	−13.0
Registered electors		67,337		
Liberal Democrats hold		Swing	+3.3	

=== Elections in the 1990s ===
General election 1997: Carshalton and Wallington
Party	Candidate	Votes	%	±%
Liberal Democrats	Tom Brake	18,490	38.2	+7.3
Conservative	Nigel Forman	16,223	33.5	−16.2
Labour	Andrew Theobald	11,565	23.9	+6.2
Referendum	Julian Storey	1,289	2.7	N/A
Green	Peter Hickson	377	0.8	−0.4
BNP	Gary Ritchie	261	0.5	N/A
UKIP	Leslie Povey	218	0.5	N/A
Majority		2,267	4.7	N/A
Turnout		48,423	73.3	−7.6
Registered electors		66,064		
Liberal Democrats gain from Conservative		Swing	+11.8	

General election 1992: Carshalton and Wallington
Party	Candidate	Votes	%	±%
Conservative	Nigel Forman	26,243	49.7	−4.3
Liberal Democrats	Tom Brake	16,300	30.9	+4.7
Labour	Margaret Moran	9,333	17.7	−0.5
Green	Robert Steel	614	1.2	−0.4
Loony Green	Daniel Bamford	266	0.5	N/A
Majority		9,943	18.8	−9.0
Turnout		52,756	80.9	+6.7
Registered electors		65,179		
Conservative hold		Swing	−4.5	

=== Elections in the 1980s ===
General election 1987: Carshalton and Wallington
Party	Candidate	Votes	%	±%
Conservative	Nigel Forman	27,984	54.0	+2.7
SDP	John Grant	13,575	26.2	−3.4
Labour	Johanna Baker	9,440	18.2	+0.7
Green	Robert Steel	843	1.6	0.0
Majority		14,409	27.8	+6.1
Turnout		51,842	74.2	+3.0
Registered electors		69,906		
Conservative hold		Swing	+3.1	

General election 1983: Carshalton and Wallington
Party	Candidate	Votes	%	±%
Conservative	Nigel Forman	25,396	51.3	+0.0
SDP	Bryan Ensor	14,641	29.6	+13.9
Labour	Johanna Baker	8,655	17.5	–13.7
Ecology	Robert Steel	784	1.6	New
Majority		10,755	21.7	–13.9
Turnout		49,476	71.1	–5.6
Registered electors		69,542		
Conservative hold		Swing	–6.9	

1979 notional result
Party	Vote	%
Conservative	26,492	51.3
Labour	16,121	31.2
Liberal	8,112	15.7
National Front	919	1.8
Turnout	51644	76.8
Electorate	67,255	

== See also ==
- List of parliamentary constituencies in London
