= Elliot Colburn =

British Conservative politician (born 1992)

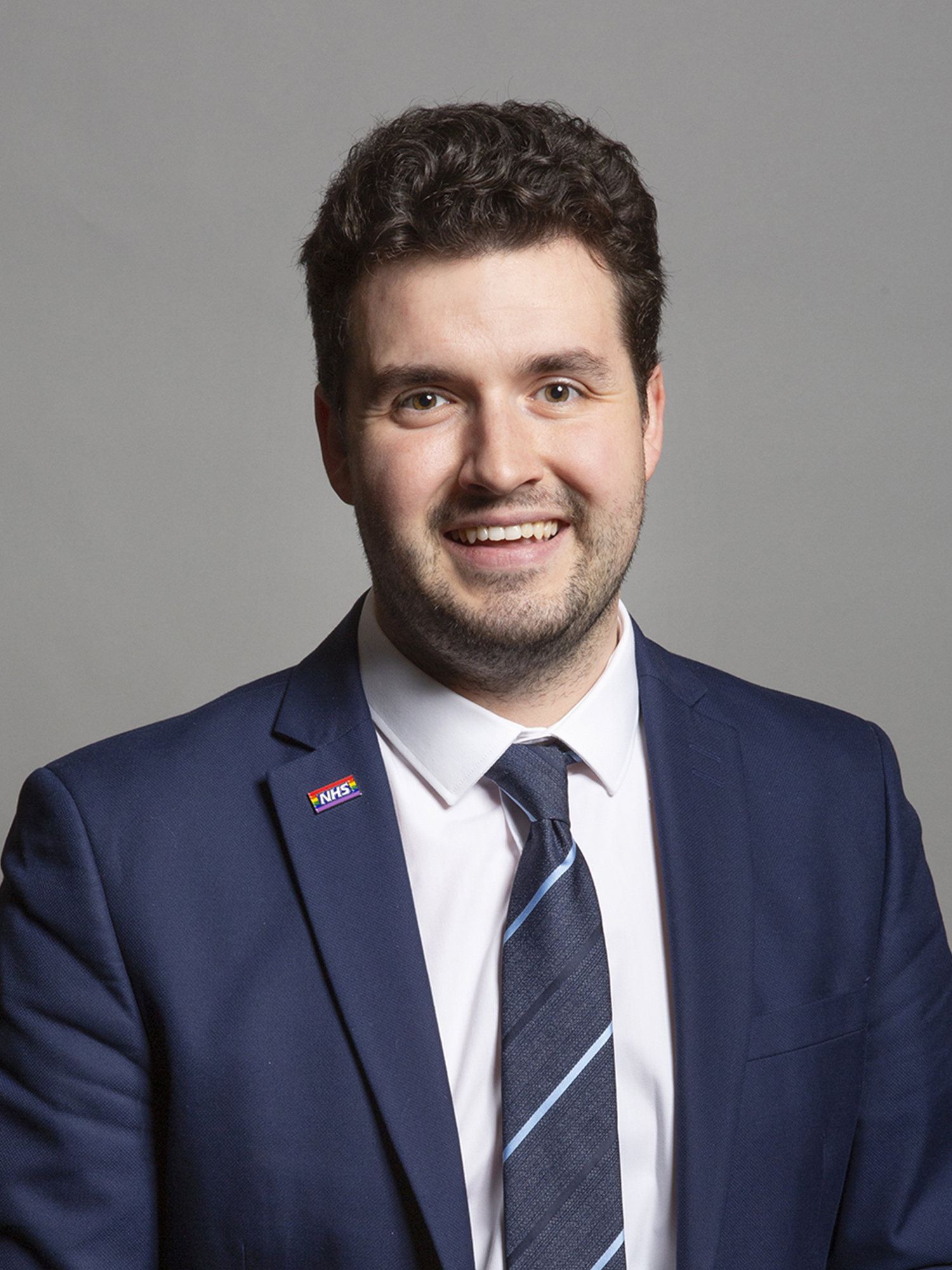

Member of Parliament for Carshalton and Wallington
- In office 12 December 2019 – 30 May 2024
- Preceded by: Tom Brake
- Succeeded by: Bobby Dean

Member of Sutton London Borough Council for Cheam
- In office 8 May 2018 – 5 May 2022

Personal details
- Born: 6 August 1992 (age 34) St Helier, London, England
- Party: Conservative
- Education: Aberystwyth University
- Profession: Politician
- Website: www.elliotcolburn.co.uk

Elliot Haydn George Colburn (born 6 August 1992) is a British Conservative Party politician. He was the Member of Parliament (MP) for Carshalton and Wallington from the 2019 general election until he lost his seat in 2024. Colburn also served as councillor for the Cheam ward on Sutton Council from 2018 to 2022.

== Early life ==
Colburn was born at St Helier Hospital and Queen Mary's Hospital for Children in St Helier, London. He grew up in Sutton, London, and attended Carshalton Boys Sports College. Colburn has campaigned for the Conservative Party since the age of 13, and studied politics at Aberystwyth University.

After graduation Colburn worked as a parliamentary assistant for the Sutton and Cheam MP Paul Scully, and Scotland Secretary Alister Jack. He has also worked as a public affairs officer for South West London Health and Care Partnership.

Colburn was a Conservative candidate in the 2014 Sutton Council election for Wallington North ward, and came fourth. In the 2016 referendum on membership of the European Union, Colburn supported Brexit. He was elected to Sutton Borough Council as one of the three Conservative councillors for Cheam ward at the 2018 election, and was selected on to committees for People and Scrutiny. He resigned from his council seat in 2022.

== Career ==
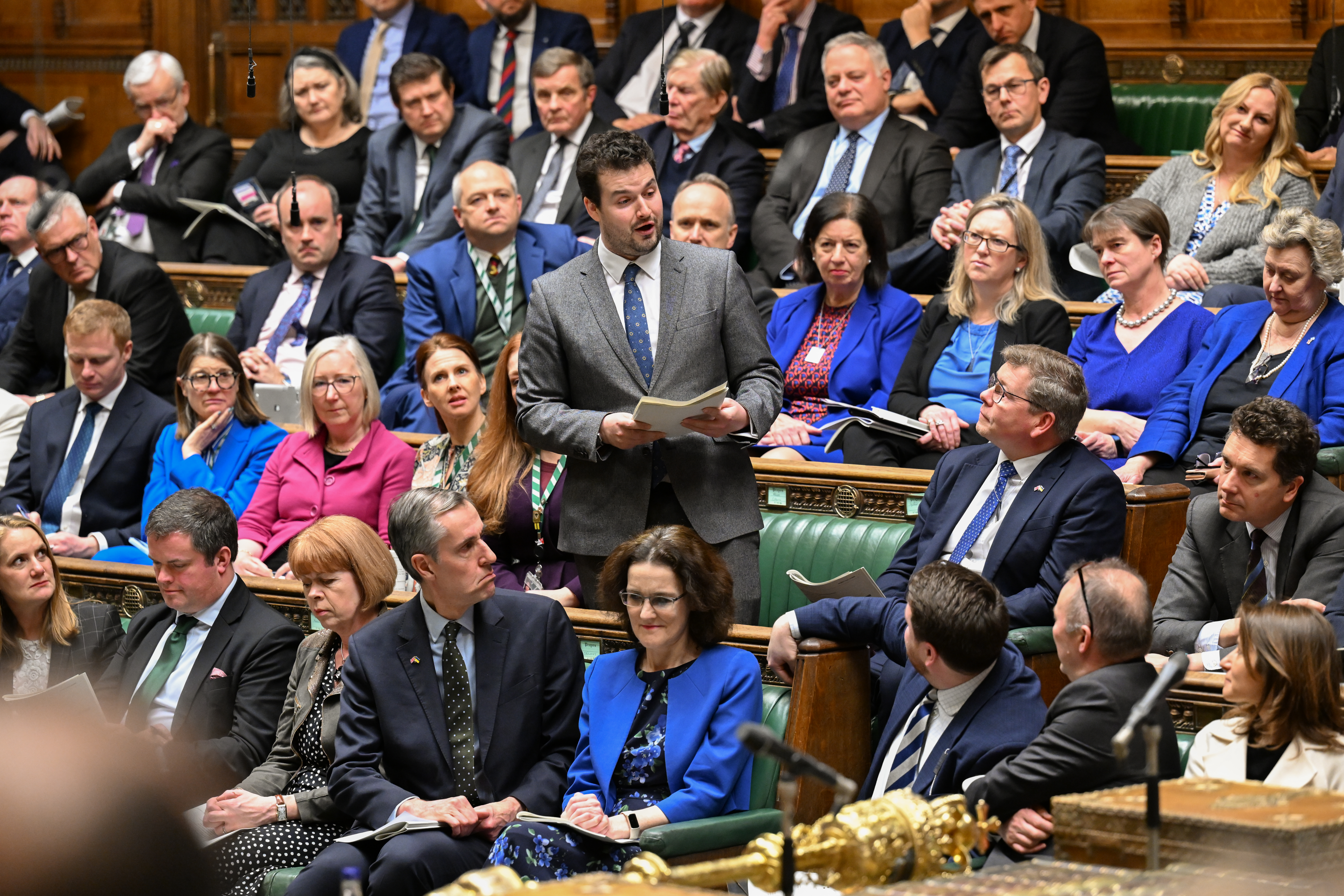
Colburn speaking during Prime Minister's Questions, 7 February 2024

Colburn was selected as the Conservative candidate for Carshalton and Wallington on 11 February 2019. He then won the election that year, wresting it from 24 years of Liberal Democrat representation with a majority of 629 and 42.4% of the vote. His campaign included local promises to extend the London Overground to Sutton, and to oppose the settling of gypsies and travellers on local green spaces.

Colburn joined the Petitions and the Women and Equalities Committees the next year. He was vice-chair of the All-Party Parliamentary Group on HIV/AIDS. Colburn submitted a letter of no confidence in Prime Minister Boris Johnson in the wake of Sue Gray's report on Partygate in May 2022.

Colburn endorsed Penny Mordaunt in the July–September 2022 Conservative Party leadership election, and again in the October 2022 Conservative Party leadership election.

He lost his seat in 2024 to Liberal Democrat Bobby Dean. Having spoken prominently about help with suicidal thoughts, including his own, Colburn found a new career as a manager for the Samaritans, in Public Affairs and Campaigns.

== Personal life ==
Colburn is gay. After receiving a homophobic death threat in 2021, he spoke out to raise awareness of the abuse MPs too often face.

Colburn has served as a trustee of the charitable organisation Community Action Sutton and as a Scout Leader for the 6th Carshalton Scout Group.

In February 2024, at Prime Minister's Questions, Colburn revealed he had attempted suicide three years before, and said that he wanted to share the message that "help is out there." The contribution was welcomed by the Prime Minister and Leader of the Opposition.

Parliament of the United Kingdom
Preceded by Tom Brake	Member of Parliament for Carshalton and Wallington; 2019–2024	Succeeded by Bobby Dean
