= Bobby Dean =

British politician

Bobby Dean MP
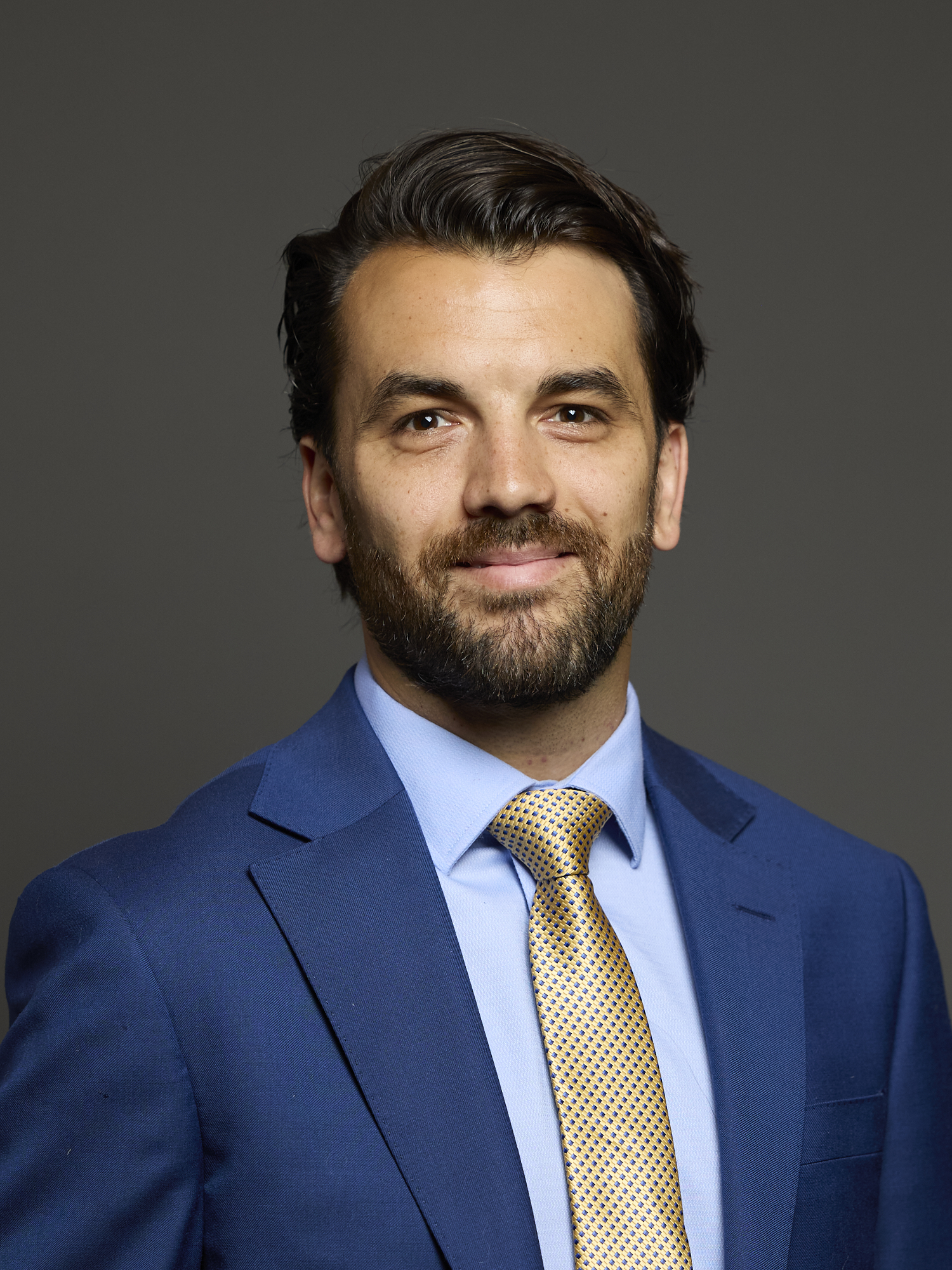
- Official portrait, 2024

Member of Parliament for Carshalton and Wallington
- Incumbent
- Assumed office 4 July 2024
- Preceded by: Elliot Colburn
- Majority: 7,905 (16.9%)

Liberal Democrat Shadow Leader of the House of Commons
- Incumbent
- Assumed office 1 October 2025
- Leader: Ed Davey
- Preceded by: Marie Goldman

Member of Sutton London Borough Council for The Wrythe
- In office 2022–2026

Personal details
- Born: Bobby Warren Dean; 8 March 1990 (age 36)
- Party: Liberal Democrat
- Education: Goldsmiths, University of London; University College London

Bobby Warren Dean (born 1989 or 1990) is a British Liberal Democrat politician who has been Member of Parliament (MP) for Carshalton and Wallington since 2024.

== Early life ==
Dean is from Essex, where he was raised in a council house. His father was a scaffolder and his mother worked as a cleaner. He attended Colchester Sixth Form College and went on to read international studies at Goldsmiths, University of London, graduating in 2011. He later completed a Master of Science (MSc) in public policy at University College London (UCL) in 2022. He has Indian heritage, with his maternal grandparents moving from Calcutta to Croydon in the 1960s.

== Career ==
Dean ran his own small business advising charities tackling global poverty. He was a councillor on Sutton London Borough Council for The Wrythe ward between 2022 and 2026.

Dean contested Lewisham Deptford at both the 2017 and 2019 General Elections, coming third both times.

On 1 October 2025, Dean was appointed to the frontbench team of Ed Davey as the Commons Business spokesperson, shadowing the Leader of the House of Commons in government. He sits on the House of Commons Treasury Select Committee and was a leading voice on the motor finance scandal. He has challenged the Government on its failure to fund repairs and redevelopment of St Helier Hospital in his constituency, which he supports in its other campaigns.

Dean is a member of the All-Party Parliamentary Groups for Anti-Corruption and Responsible Tax; Hong Kong; and Tamils. He is a recognised environmental campaigner, defending the River Wandle, London's main surviving chalk stream that was in 2025 polluted by sewage plant overflows and an oil spill.

== Personal life ==
Dean moved to Deptford, South London in 2008. He now lives in Carshalton with his wife Gemma, their daughter (born in 2026 at St Helier Hospital) and their dog.

Parliament of the United Kingdom
Preceded by Elliot Colburn	Member of Parliament for Carshalton and Wallington; 2024–present	Incumbent
