= The Wrythe =

District of Carshalton, South London, United Kingdom

Coordinates: 51°22′27″N 0°9′56″W

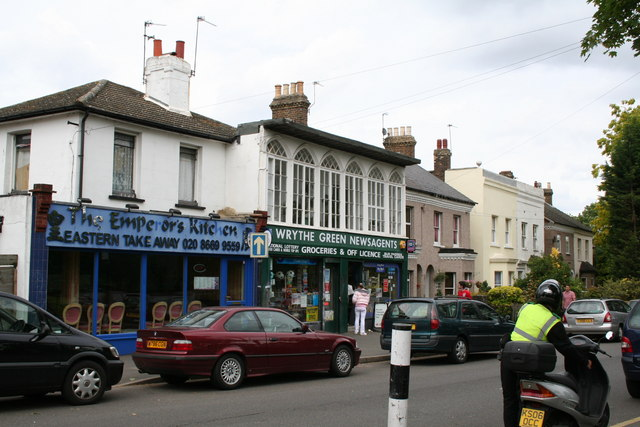
Wrythe Green

The Wrythe is a district of Carshalton, South London in the London Borough of Sutton. It is 9.3 miles (15.0 km) south of Charing Cross and is surrounded by the adjacent areas of Hackbridge to the east, Morden and Mitcham to the north, and Sutton to the west. The area is commonly referred to as Wrythe Green, an old village green at the centre of the neighbourhood. The Wrythe had a population of 10,163 in the 2011 Census.

== Toponymy and human history ==
The name "The Wrythe" is thought to derive from the Old English /raɪð/, meaning a small stream or spring. A spring rose on the site of the BP garage opposite, and there were small ponds on the green in the mid-18th century. The area is first recorded in 1229 as Rithe, and later as le Ryth (1450) and la Rye (1484). The first reference to the local area as Rye Common is found in tithe records from 1847 and the modern spelling "Wrythe" first appears on the Ordnance Survey map of 1867.

The Wrythe area's history dates back to the Roman era. However, it remained largely undeveloped until the 18th century, with large development taking place in the 1930s. The population of The Wrythe ward is 10,384 residents.

== Facilities ==
The Wrythe, about 1 mile (1.6 km) from the centre of Carshalton, has a small number of independent restaurants and shops.

Carshalton College is located in the Wrythe area, and it also contains four primary schools:

- Victor Seymour Infants School
- Harris Junior Academy Carshalton
- Muschamp Primary
- Rushy Meadow Primary

== Transport links ==
The Wrythe Green, traversed by short roads and surrounded by shops is centred 400 metres north of Carshalton railway station, the area is within walking distance of Hackbridge railway station and Mitcham Junction providing access to London Trams. The nearest London Underground station is Morden, which is two miles from the area.

The area is served by the bus routes 127 to Tooting and Purley, 151 to Worcester Park and Wallington and 157 to Morden and Crystal Palace. The 151 serves the centre and main road of the Wrythe, while the 157 serves the M&S branch, and the 127 serves the college.
