= The Wrythe (ward) =

- Electoral ward for the Sutton London Borough Council
- The Wrythe ward boundaries since 2022
- Borough: Sutton
- County: Greater London
- Population: 10,938 (2021) (Note: 2021 Census data reported for 2022 ward boundaries)
- Electorate: 7,890 (2022)
- Major settlements: The Wrythe
- Area: 1.420 square kilometres (0.548 sq mi)

Current electoral ward
- Created: 2002
- Number of members: 3
- Councillors: Colin Stears; Bobby Dean; Patrick Ogbonna
- GSS code: E05000568 (2002–2022); E05013769 (2022–present)

The Wrythe is an electoral ward in the London Borough of Sutton. The ward was first used in the 2002 elections. It returns councillors to Sutton London Borough Council.

== List of councillors ==
Term	Councillor	Party
2002–2014	Susan Stears	Liberal Democrats
2002–2006	Sheila Siggins	Liberal Democrats
2002–2014	Roger Thistle	Liberal Democrats
2006–present	Colin Stears	Liberal Democrats
2014–2018	Callum Morton	Liberal Democrats
2014–2022	Nali Patel	Liberal Democrats
2018–2022	Sam Weatherlake	Liberal Democrats
2022–present	Bobby Dean	Liberal Democrats
2022–present	Patrick Ogbonna	Liberal Democrats

== Sutton council elections since 2022 ==
There was a revision of ward boundaries in Sutton in 2022.

=== 2022 election ===
The election took place on 5 May 2022.

2022 Sutton London Borough Council election: The Wrythe
Party	Candidate	Votes	%	±%
Liberal Democrats	Bobby Dean	1,492	47.9	
Liberal Democrats	Colin Stears	1,337	43.0	
Liberal Democrats	Patrick Ogbonna	1,225	39.4	
Conservative	Edward Dwight	1,175	37.8	
Conservative	Robert Okpuru	1,138	36.6	
Conservative	Daisy Pearce	1,084	34.8	
Labour	David Grant	534	17.2	
Labour	Margaret Thomas	488	15.7	
Labour	Cecil Tate	468	15.0	
Green	Faye Burnett	394	12.7	
Turnout				
Liberal Democrats win (new boundaries)				
Liberal Democrats win (new boundaries)				
Liberal Democrats win (new boundaries)				

== 2002–2022 Sutton council elections ==
The Wrythe ward boundaries from 2002 to 2022

=== 2018 election ===
The election took place on 3 May 2018.

2018 Sutton London Borough Council election: The Wrythe
Party	Candidate	Votes	%	±%
Liberal Democrats	Colin Stears	1,324	46.8	+1.3
Liberal Democrats	Sam Weatherlake	1,249	44.2	−1.5
Liberal Democrats	Nali Patel	1,224	43.3	+2.5
Conservative	Will Curley	760	26.9	+9.4
Conservative	Millie Shields	747	26.4	+9.8
Conservative	Sebastian Wopinski	659	23.3	+10.4
Labour	Sheila Berry	533	18.9	+3.4
Labour	Carlos De Sousa	498	17.6	+3.5
Labour	Paul McCarthy	476	16.8	+4.3
Green	Penelope Mouncey	204	7.2	−3.1
UKIP	John Bannon	196	6.9	−18.8
Green	Michael Boulton	187	6.6	N/A
UKIP	Bill Main-Ian	177	6.3	N/A
UKIP	Gino Marotta	129	4.6	N/A
Green	Phillip Mouncey	121	4.3	N/A
Rejected ballots		2		
Turnout		2,829	34.09	
Liberal Democrats hold		Swing		
Liberal Democrats hold		Swing		
Liberal Democrats hold		Swing		

=== 2014 election ===
The election took place on 22 May 2014.

2014 Sutton London Borough Council election: The Wrythe
Party	Candidate	Votes	%	±%
Liberal Democrats	Callum Morton	1,341	45.7	
Liberal Democrats	Colin Stears	1,337	45.5	
Liberal Democrats	Nali Patel	1,199	40.8	
UKIP	Chris Howe	754	25.7	
Conservative	Benjamin Scully	513	17.5	
Conservative	Charles Manton	487	16.6	
Labour	Deirdre Barry	455	15.5	
Labour	Alex Milligan	415	14.1	
Conservative	Marion Williams	378	12.9	
Labour	Tony Thorpe	365	12.4	
Green	Derek Coleman	303	10.3	
Turnout		2,936	40.1	−26.7
Liberal Democrats hold		Swing		
Liberal Democrats hold		Swing		
Liberal Democrats hold		Swing		

=== 2010 election ===
The election on 6 May 2010 took place on the same day as the United Kingdom general election.

2010 Sutton London Borough Council election: The Wrythe
Party	Candidate	Votes	%	±%
Liberal Democrats	Colin Stears	2,566		
Liberal Democrats	Susan Stears	2,491		
Liberal Democrats	Roger Thistle	2,229		
Conservative	Samantha Drew	1,511		
Conservative	Terry Faulds	1,432		
Conservative	Jim Simms	1,329		
Labour	Pat Simons	585		
Labour	Sean Hayward	570		
Labour	Andrew Theobald	562		
BNP	Sarah Bristow	451		
Green	Andrew Lindsay	377		
Turnout				
Liberal Democrats hold		Swing		
Liberal Democrats hold		Swing		
Liberal Democrats hold		Swing		

=== 2006 election ===
The election took place on 4 May 2006.

2006 Sutton London Borough Council election: The Wrythe
Party	Candidate	Votes	%	±%
Liberal Democrats	Susan Stears	1,436	54.3	
Liberal Democrats	Colin Stears	1,405		
Liberal Democrats	Roger Thistle	1,370		
Conservative	Derek Lockhart	867	32.8	
Conservative	Christopher Wortley	834		
Conservative	Stephen Odunton	791		
Labour	Margaret Collier	343	13.0	
Labour	Catherine Magee	337		
Labour	Margaret Hughes	335		
Turnout			36.6	
Liberal Democrats hold		Swing		
Liberal Democrats hold		Swing		
Liberal Democrats hold		Swing		

=== 2002 election ===
The election took place on 2 May 2002.

2002 Sutton London Borough Council election: The Wrythe
Party	Candidate	Votes	%	±%
Liberal Democrats	Susan Stears	1,176		
Liberal Democrats	Sheila Siggins	1,142		
Liberal Democrats	Roger Thistle	1,103		
Conservative	Robert Creece	544		
Conservative	Christopher Wortley	540		
Conservative	Marion Williams	536		
Labour	Richard Collier	377		
Labour	Anthony Thorpe	365		
Labour	Bodipala Wijeyesinghe	354		
Green	Karin Andrews	118		
Green	William Fuller	99		
Turnout				
Liberal Democrats win (new seat)				
Liberal Democrats win (new seat)				
Liberal Democrats win (new seat)				
