= Carshalton South and Clockhouse =

Electoral ward of Sutton, London

- Electoral ward for the Sutton London Borough Council
- Carshalton South and Clockhouse ward boundaries since 2022
- Borough: Sutton
- County: Greater London
- Population: 9,960 (2021) (Note: 2021 Census data reported for 2022 ward boundaries)
- Electorate: 7,692 (2022)
- Area: 6.994 square kilometres (2.700 sq mi)

Current electoral ward
- Created: 2002
- Number of members: 3
- Councillors: Moira Butt; Timothy Crowley; Lisa Webster
- GSS code: E05000559 (2002–2022); E05013757 (2022–present)

Carshalton South and Clockhouse is an electoral ward in the London Borough of Sutton. The ward was first used in the 2002 elections. It returns councillors to Sutton London Borough Council.

== Sutton council elections since 2022 ==
There was a revision of ward boundaries in Sutton in 2022.

=== 2025 by-election ===
The by-election will take place on 22 May 2025, following the resignation of Amy Haldane.

2025 Carshalton South and Clockhouse by-election
Party	Candidate	Votes	%	±%
Liberal Democrats	Lisa Webster	1,674	52.2	
Conservative	Chris da Cruz	767	23.9	
Reform	Arlene Dearlove	573	17.9	
Labour	John Keys	89	2.8	
Green	Peter Friel	79	2.5	
CPA	Ashley Dickenson	23	0.7	
Turnout				
Liberal Democrats hold		Swing		

=== 2022 election ===
The election took place on 5 May 2022.

2022 Sutton London Borough Council election: Carshalton South and Clockhouse
Party	Candidate	Votes	%	±%
Conservative	Moira Butt	1,698	47.8	
Conservative	Timothy Crowley	1,669	47.0	
Liberal Democrats	Amy Haldane	1,617	45.6	
Conservative	Lynne Fletcher	1,544	43.5	
Liberal Democrats	Brendan Hudson	1,523	42.9	
Liberal Democrats	Noormahamod Sumun	1,317	37.1	
Green	Hannah Smith	387	10.9	
Labour	John Clay	329	9.3	
Labour	Michael McLoughlin	286	8.1	
Labour	Roberta Lambert	279	7.9	
Turnout				
Conservative win (new boundaries)				
Conservative win (new boundaries)				
Liberal Democrats win (new boundaries)				

== 2002–2022 Sutton council elections ==
Carshalton South and Clockhouse ward boundaries from 2002 to 2022

=== 2018 election ===
The election took place on 3 May 2018.

2018 Sutton London Borough Council election: Carshalton South and Clockhouse
Party	Candidate	Votes	%	±%
Liberal Democrats	Amy Haldane	1,809	47.9	+12.7
Conservative	Moira Butt	1,767	46.8	+9.2
Conservative	Tim Crowley	1,747	46.3	+6.4
Conservative	Melissa Pearce	1,596	42.3	+10.5
Liberal Democrats	Gordon Roxburgh	1,544	40.9	+6.0
Liberal Democrats	Jason Reynolds	1,524	40.4	+10.1
Labour	John Clay	376	10.0	−0.1
Labour	Anas Khan	343	9.1	−
Labour	Christine Savignani	340	9.0	+1.9
Green	Ross Hemingway	295	7.8	−5.6
Rejected ballots		6		
Turnout		3,782	48.37	
Liberal Democrats hold		Swing		
Conservative hold		Swing		
Conservative hold		Swing		

=== 2014 election ===
The election took place on 22 May 2014.

2014 Sutton London Borough Council election: Carshalton South and Clockhouse
Party	Candidate	Votes	%	±%
Conservative	Tim Crowley	1,449	39.9	
Conservative	Moira Butt	1,365	37.6	
Liberal Democrats	Amy Haldane	1,276	35.2	
Liberal Democrats	Peter Fosdike	1,268	34.9	
Conservative	Tony Smith	1,155	31.8	
Liberal Democrats	Alex Vicente-Machado	1,100	30.3	
UKIP	Alexandra Wraith	617	17.0	
Green	Ross Hemingway	488	13.4	
Labour	Marilynne Burbage	366	10.1	
Labour	David Davis	331	9.1	
Labour	Claire Shearer	259	7.1	
Green	Brian Dougherty	245	6.7	
Turnout		3,630	47.2	−28.8
Conservative hold		Swing		
Conservative hold		Swing		
Liberal Democrats hold		Swing		
