= Sutton Civic Offices =

Municipal building in London, England

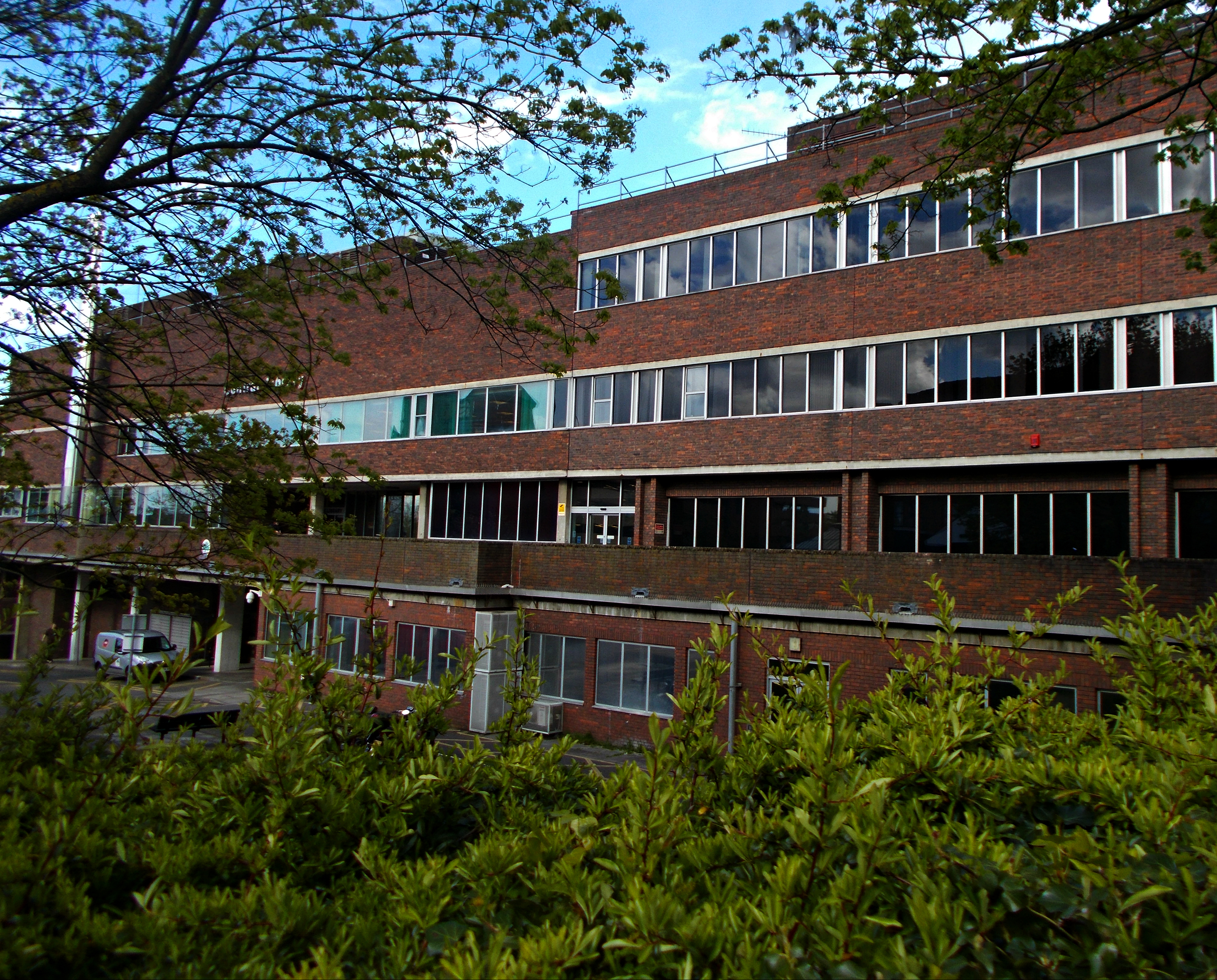
- Sutton Civic Offices

- Shown in Sutton
- 51.3616°N 0.1950°W
- Location: St Nicholas Way, Sutton

History
- Built: 1975

Site notes
- Architect: Charles Sierakowski
- Architectural style: Modernist style

Sutton Civic Offices is a municipal facility in St Nicholas Way, Sutton, London. It is the headquarters of Sutton London Borough Council. In October 2022, Sutton Council announced plans to sell off the existing civic offices, the public library, and Sutton College, as well as the Gibson Road Car Park and Secombe Theatre, for housing. The new Sutton Civic Hub will be built within the St Nicholas Centre.

== History ==
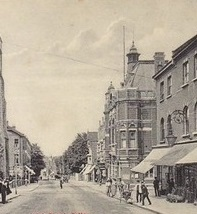
The old municipal offices with the unusual octagon corner tower and turret on the roof

The current civic offices were commissioned to replace the old municipal offices at the corner of Throwley Road and the High Street which had been designed in the Baroque style and completed in 1902. The old municipal offices had been established as the offices of the Sutton Urban District Council and went on to become the headquarters of the Municipal Borough of Sutton and Cheam in 1934. They continued to be the local seat of government when the enlarged London Borough of Sutton was formed in 1965 but, having been assessed as uneconomic to maintain, were demolished in 1972.

In the 1960s civic leaders had decided to procure new civic offices: the site they selected was occupied by three large private houses. They decided that the new civic offices, which would take over the role of headquarters of the London Borough of Sutton, would form part of a larger complex involving the civic offices to the south, a public library to the west and Sutton College to the north. It was also intended to have a separate building for the council chamber but this was never built for financial reasons.

The new building, which was designed by the assistant borough architect, Charles Sierakowski, (Note: Sierakowski also designed the Art Gallery of Western Australia) in the modernist style, was completed in phases between 1972 and 1975. (Note: The college was completed in 1972 and the public library opened in 1975.)

The design involved an asymmetrical main frontage onto St Nicholas Way with a canopied glass entrance to the civic offices and to the public library on the left, and a canopied glass entrance to the college on the right: there were continuous rows of glazing with brickwork above and below on the first, second and third floors throughout the complex. In the absence of a purpose-built council chamber, a multi-purpose area within the public library known as the "Europa Gallery" was designated as available for use by the borough council for their meetings.

In October 2022, Sutton Council announced plans to sell the civic offices, the public library, and Sutton College, as well as the Gibson Road Car Park and Secombe Theatre, for housing.

== Future plans: Sutton Civic Hub ==
In October 2024, Sutton Council announced a partnership with Genr8 Kajima Regeneration Ltd (GKRL) to deliver the next phase of the town centre regeneration, which includes a new Civic Hub. The Civic Hub will be located at the former Debenhams site within the St Nicholas Centre which the council has owned since 2021.

The Hub will provide residents with a central location to access services from the Council and its partners, as well as new library and community spaces. The Civic Hub is expected to be completed by mid-2029.

The site of the current Civic Offices will be sold and repurposed for housing.
