= Worcester Park =

Suburb of Greater London, England

Coordinates: 51.375°N 0.239°W

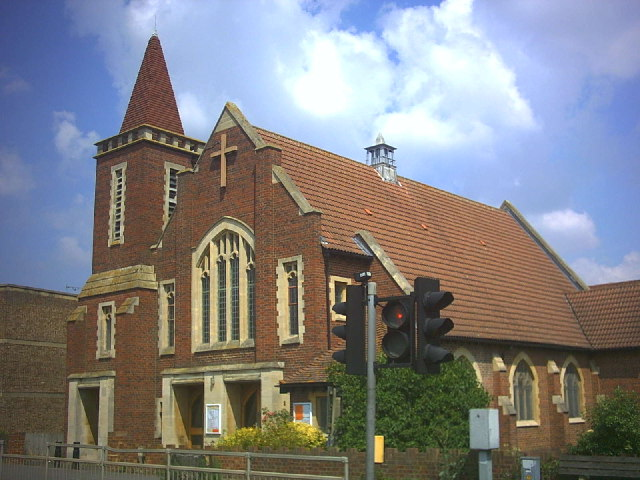
- Christ Church with St. Philip

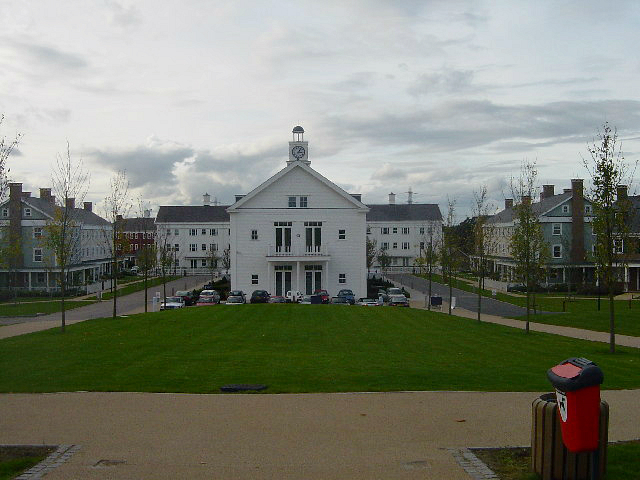
- Part of 'The Hamptons', a 2021-completed quarter of Worcester Park

- Location within Greater London
- Population: 22,370 per mid-2024 estimates: 3 electoral wards spanning 2 UK regions
- OS grid reference: TQ225655
  - Charing Cross: 10.1 mi (16.3 km) NE
- London borough: Sutton
- District: Epsom and Ewell
- Ceremonial county: Greater London
- Ceremonial county: Surrey
- Region: London
- Country: England
- Sovereign state: United Kingdom
- Post town: WORCESTER PARK
- Postcode district: KT4
- Dialling code: 020
- Police: Metropolitan
- Fire: London
- Ambulance: London
- UK Parliament: Sutton and Cheam; Epsom and Ewell
- London Assembly: Croydon and Sutton

Worcester Park is a mixed residential-commercial suburb in south-west London and Surrey, England. Straddling the London Borough of Sutton and East Surrey, its namesake post town also covers part of Old Malden in the Royal Borough of Kingston upon Thames. Worcester Park is 10 miles (16 km) south-west of Charing Cross. Its population can be approximated, in 2024 as 18,487. The suburb comprises the Worcester Park North and South wards (Note: Wards are the electorally drawn divisions of local authorities with weighting on equality of electorate across one-, two- or three- base single-councillor units, with modest divergence permitted towards historic and current local identity) with 8,422 residents 7,116 residents and in its recent versions the Cuddington ward, a set to be abolished part of Epsom and Ewell, which has an estimated 6,832 residents as at 30 June 2024. Each of the three wards listed has been served by two councillors however from April 2027, the relevant Surrey inclusion (approximately one third) is a part of two-councillor, expanded ward, namely: Ewell Court, Auriol and Cuddington.

Worcester Park railway station (London Zone 4, South Western Railway) is the core of the commercial part of the suburb, and explains how the place name took over previous local identities. These were as its streets lay in non-focal fields of its predecessor communities in the traditional 'parish system' (namely of Old Malden, Cheam, and Cuddington, see history below). Trains stop here between London Waterloo and variously each hour: Guildford via Epsom or Dorking (via Epsom) (sometimes extending their journey as Horsham (via Epsom)).

An upper stretch of London's Beverley Brook runs through the area, at length. Large building The Brook, formerly "Huntsmans Hall" was at an eastern limit of the large hunting grounds earmarked and protected by Act of Parliament for Henry VIII's personal enjoyment.

== History ==
=== Early history ===
Worcester Park in the 1870s. It was divided between a small corner of Tolworth, and then in thirds between (Old) Malden, Cuddington and Cheam which explains its cross-regional nature today.

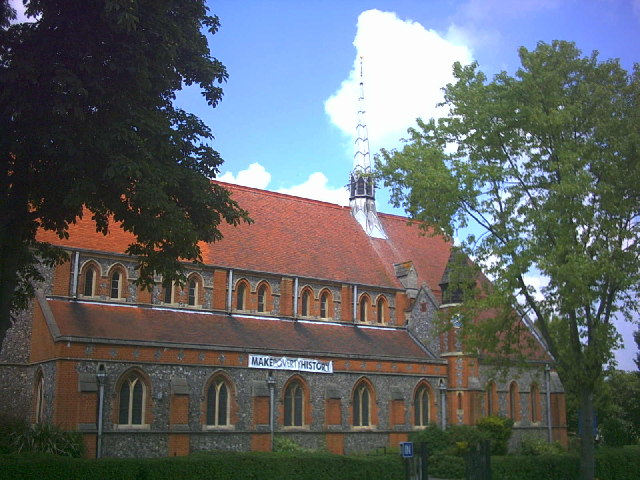
Today's C of E Church of St. Mary sits on The Avenue. It serves the west half of Worcester Park (also known as in a faded way mainly reinforced in some of local politics, Cuddington)

Worcester Park takes its name from the Edward Somerset, 4th Earl of Worcester, who was appointed Keeper of the Great Park of Nonsuch in 1606. The whole of the former village of Cuddington, with its mansion and church, were swept away two generations before by Henry VIII to make room for the never-completed palace afterwards known as Nonsuch, and its two parks—the Great Park later called Worcester Park (containing 911 acres), and the Little Park (containing 671 acres). Lysons puts the great (northern) park's extent at just over 1,000 acres (400 ha). Both parks were originally used as deer parks. The king obtained the land from Sir Richard de Codington.

During the ownership by Sir Richard, the manor house of the long parish lay in the north-west corner of the strip parish of Cuddington, which was later replaced by Worcester House and is now the site of Worcester Close. In 1650, including its valuable ownership of gunpowder mills across the powerful river/stream at the time of the English Civil War (War of the Three Kingdoms) it was assessed as worth £550 (equivalent to £86,000 in 2025) per annum. Where the relevant Anglican church of those centuries (still dedicated to Saint Mary) stood is unknown to a parish-by-parish county history research team of 1911, but since 1895 one has been restored still nominally known as Cuddington, with a territory serving the western half of Worcester Park close where to the 17th century house stood. It lies in the Diocese of Guildford, a major offshoot created in 1927 from the ancient Diocese of Winchester.

=== 18th. 19th centuries and churches ===
In 1750, Worcester Park was acquired by William Taylor. He used its large mill ('Malden Mills') west of his mansion, spanning the banks of the Hogsmill River to continue the manufacture of gunpowder which had been carried out on and off there for decades, in what was, in an era of ten-percent tithes to the established church, Tolworth. The mills were designed in 1771 by John Smeaton. Manufacturing continued until at least 1854 when the mill blew up and heavily damaged the westerly structure.

For the eastern half of the railway catchment and suburb, a new Anglican church was added in 1876. A parish was formed for it in 1906 from small parts of Cheam and Cuddington. It had red brick, with Bath stone dressing in quasi 13th-century style. This was St. Philip's church, which crumbled in 1978; today that parish has no building that is not shared, instead is part of a Local Ecumenical Partnership meaning the congregation worships in the locale's Methodist Church, as Christ Church with Saint Philip, which has two halls. Two 'cottages' in the east of Worcester Park date bear an early date plaque of 1828 and are a surviving part of a group marked as Poplar Place on the Ordnance Survey maps of 1867-78. Apparently owned by the Pennington family (who owned the Drill Inn a predecessor of the present H G Wells Public House and had a small farm locally). This is the last surviving houses of a group of cottages along Cheam Common Road which housed farm labourers and those working in the local brickmaking industry.

Worcester Park Baptist Church was built in 1890 on Longfellow Road before it moved to 2 The Avenue (opposite the railway station south entrance, at a tripoint of three local authorities).

Most of Worcester Park is served in Roman Catholicism by the church of Saint Matthias During the seventeenth and eighteenth centuries there were three Catholic centres in Surrey: Cheam, Richmond Palace, and Sutton Park near Guildford. Later on, whenever persecution or local bigotry was relaxed, it became possible in some places to establish small mass-centres in much more ordinary houses. These mission centres were usually tucked away in remote buildings hidden from view, or in back streets so as not to arouse local hostility or bigotry. About 1635 a Mission centre was secretly established in East Cheam in the large Dower House of the Fromond family, near the Sutton end of Gander Green Lane, and this mission was at first served from the queen's chapel at Richmond. The Convent of the Daughters of the Cross opened a small chapel in their new hospital and sanatorium in London Road (North Cheam), immediately beyond Worcester Park's eastern post town boundary, in 1904. This was not their present beautiful chapel but a large room in the convent. In 1788 when the Petre family sold their Surrey home here the small Catholic congregation had no chapel left, yet when the French refugee priest, Charles Coestryck, came to live here in 1802 he found about twenty Catholics still living in the district and was able to minister to them until 1814. For many years the nearest mass centre was probably at Richmond until when in 1850 the wealthy Rafael family, who were Austrian nobility, built a fine (at first essentially) private chapel in the Italian style St Raphael's Church, Surbiton facing the Thames. For over a hundred years it remained legally a private family church, but the public were admitted, and it became famous for its church music, hiring continental opera singers who happened to be singing in London. In 1906, through the generosity of Miss Francis Elizabeth Ellis, this church began as a small permanent chapel dedicated to St. Matthias. She had already provided half a dozen other churches in what became South London.

== Dual identity streets (area) ==
About 1/5 of the land in the only relevant post town (WORCESTER PARK, KT4) is still known in some way as Cheam Common/North Cheam, by the few businesses and amenities in the far east; About 1/6 of the land, namely the land at the north-west end of that post town as served by Malden Manor station and Old Malden Library is known in those terms by its local residents – the eastern and western fringes have these competing, dual identities reinforced by those names in wards councillors represent and ballots are addressed to.

Maps show no natural buffers or barriers as to the sets of streets with these overlapping or competing identities. The post town (also called KT4 area, which mirrors the railway station's economic ambit) defies the pre-postal (and current electoral ward) designation of the east of Worcester Park as 'North Cheam', the other half of which (on and east of London Road) has the Sutton post town, and Cheam postcode. It is an option to compromise in the UK, by adding/using the locality line feature, before WORCESTER PARK in address fields. Others still, as Cuddington or Worcester Park in businesses in trading names and in conversation consider their 'town' or 'neighbourhood' to be unrestrictedly Worcester Park, with no reference to their ward and matching historic parish for the sets of streets described above – Worcester Park's high street is central as is its matching railway station catchment (zone with the nearest such amenities, except for the far west). Mono-identity positions are reinforced by Cheam having become a long, narrow area, known as a 'strip parish' to reach the north crest of the nearby wide Banstead Downs range of the North Downs, especially since Henry VIII's changes when Nonsuch Park, known as the manor of West Cheam, was depopulated, and the identity of adjoining strip parish, Cuddington, was removed by his ordered demolition of its church and eviction of its population. Old Malden was a tiny parish compared to those around it of 842 acres (1.3 sq mi) (excluding its exclave of Chessington), as it remains a small place today.

=== 20th century: Suburban residential development ===
Over 80% of the land here was fields in the 1870s. Still a considerable amount, about 5% of the land was the garden of Worcester Park house, in the west of the area at that decade, which approximately half lay in Old Malden, as it had for over 700 years. Houses rose similarly to population, which rose in the becoming out-of-use 'Cuddington' from 1,194 residents in 1911 to 2,833 in 1931, to 11,403 in 1951. The south of the district had further housing added in the 1960s on the sale of remaining plots of the former Worcester Park Brick Works. The remainder is mostly newer homes, the majority late 20th century rather than third millennium, scattered across Worcester Park - which has an isolated four buildings from 1700 to 1840, in which period most buildings surviving qualify and are likely to be listed buildings. 'Worcester Park' has its so-named listed War Memorial in the debated part of the area which some residents assert by history and post town is more, or entirely (North) Cheam.

== The Hamptons and Mayflower Park ==
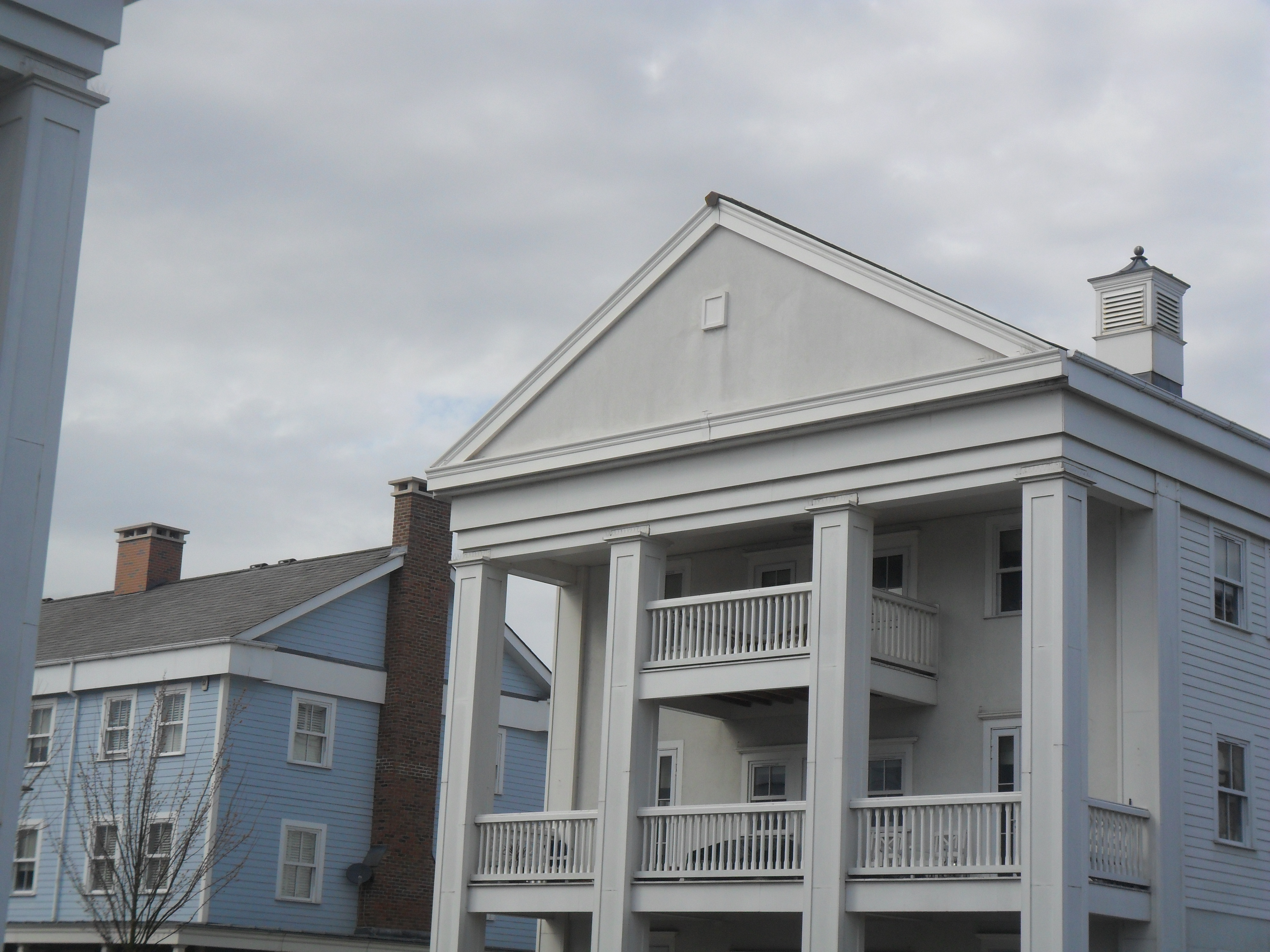
Archetypal colonial revival architecture of The Hamptons.

The Hamptons is a neighbourhood (approved and remaining "mixed-use") completed in 2021 by Berkeley Group Holdings. It contains mainly Colonial Revival architecture and occupies much of the northeast corner of Worcester Park. It was constructed in 30 acres (120,000 m^{2}) of parkland on the former site of sewage works and its formerly bracken buffer.

The Hamptons has conservation wetlands, an amphitheatre, community centre and gym, tennis courts (for residents) and a viewing platform with views to the City of London.

Its Mayflower Park green space has a grass amphitheatre for performances and five small, diversified, wetland nature reserves.

=== Design awards ===
The developers received four main awards.

Award	Publication
Best Large Development	London Evening Standard New Homes Awards 2011
Best Landscaping	What House? Awards 2011
Best Urban Landscape	New Homes and Garden Awards 2011
Best Development (5 star)	UK Property Awards 2010

=== 2019 Richmond House fire ===
In 2019, a fire destroyed one of its largest buildings, Richmond House leaving 23 families homeless. The investigatory survey found it spread at an uncontrollable speed due to multiple breaches of building regulations at design and build level by the major developer. Its residents brought a £3m claim for damages, settled out of court for an undisclosed sum.

== Localities ==
=== Rowe Hall ===
Two-storey Rowe Hall (2nd Cuddington Scout HQ) was built in 1958, named in honour of long-serving scout leader, Miss Ivy Rowe. It was rebuilt in 1987 after it was destroyed by arsonists. Miss Rowe was the third-form teacher at Blakesley School, a private primary school owned by Mr. and Mrs. Eric Dudley, and Akela of the 2nd Cuddington (Blakesley) Cub pack from its founding in the early 1940s to the 1960s.

=== Worcester Park House ===
Presumed to be one of the residences of the 4th Earl of Worcester, the house was on the site of Linden Bridge School by the long, riparian Worcester Park-Tolworth border near the intersection of Grafton Road and Cromwell Road.

== Governance ==
Its eastern two-thirds is part of the Sutton and Cheam constituency for elections to the House of Commons of the United Kingdom.

Its eastern two-thirds is also part of the Worcester Park North and Worcester Park South wards: for elections to Sutton London Borough Council. Its remaining third, equally by some residents still called Cuddington is respectively in Epsom and Ewell constituency and for elections since May 2026 the Ewell Court, Auriol and Cuddington ward of new East Surrey council (which acquires its legal powers from April 2027).

== Demographics ==
In 2011, around 78% of residents of Worcester Park ward were White, with 3.6% mixed race, 4.8% Asian or British Asian, 2.0% Black and 3.3% Chinese or of another ethnic group.

== Education ==
=== Primary Schools & Nurseries ===
Worcester Park has 8 primary schools and nurseries.

Cheam Common Infants and junior school are pre-World War II school buildings. Air raid shelters were found underground during an extension to the main building of the junior school. The school is at the upper end of the high street, by Worcester Park war memorial.

Dorchester Primary School is on Dorchester Road in the north of Worcester Park.

Cuddington School is a primary school on Salisbury Road in the south of the district, near the border with Stoneleigh.

Green Lane Nursery and Primary School opened in 2018 on Green Lane for pupils aged 3 to 11 as part of the Coombe Academy Trust.

Malden Parochial CofE Primary School is on The Manor Drive near Malden Manor Railway Station.

St Cecilia's Catholic Primary School is on the edge of Worcester Park where Clarkes Avenue meets the A24.

The Mead Infant and Nursery School is on Cuddington Avenue.

=== Special Education ===
Linden Bridge School is a special school, part of The Howard Partnership Trust, for pupils range from ages 4 to 19. On Grafton Road, in the south-west of the district, in its Surrey part.

== In literature ==
Worcester Park (where the author lived) is the site of the enormous launch structure built to pioneer crewed flight in the short story "The Argonauts of the Air" by H. G. Wells, written in 1895.

== Economy ==
Central Road (A2043), roughly half a mile in length has almost all of the public-facing businesses in Worcester Park including: shops, banks, estate agents, hair dressers', solicitors, restaurants, pub-restaurants, cafés, and a large Waitrose.

=== Outer London Fund ===
Along with neighbouring North Cheam, Worcester Park was a beneficiary of the Mayor of London's Outer London Fund, spent on aesthetic and (chiefly) pedestrian access improvements. This meant £2m for improvements spread across the two somewhat historically and present-day intermeshed districts. Sutton Council begun a collaborative project, steered by Councillors and community stakeholders, to spend the money on making improvements to the public realm and supporting the development and growth of businesses in the town centres.

Sutton Council's bid for the money explained: "Both Worcester Park and North Cheam are recognised as part of a network of District Centres in London by the Mayor. In this way, they play an important role in the Borough. Their development is also strategic: the long term growth strategy for Sutton identified in Sutton's Core Strategy, identifies both as ‘Centres for Intensification’ where renewal will largely be achieved through residential and mixed use development." It noted that: "Network Rail are willing to build on plans to make enhancements to Worcester Park Station, working with the Council to make a welcoming and distinctive arrival to Worcester Park."

== Transport ==
=== Rail ===
Worcester Park railway station is in Zone 4, served by the National Rail services of South Western Railway. The railway is the boundary of Surrey with the two London boroughs.

The railway line runs: in one direction London Waterloo, via Wimbledon; the other way it runs to Dorking and Guildford (both via Epsom). Trains provide roughly a 25-minute journey to Waterloo and in both directions are timetabled about every 30 minutes (excluding a long overnight pause).

=== Buses ===
There are multiple bus services that run through Worcester Park.

Bus Services through Worcester Park
Route number	Start of Route	End of Route	Accepts Oyster card?	Operator	Frequency
151	Worcester Park	Wallington	Yes	London General	10 mins
213	Kingston	Sutton	Yes	London General	10 mins 24/7
S3	Malden Manor station	Belmont	Yes	Transport UK London Bus	20 mins
SL7	Heathrow Airport	West Croydon bus station	Yes	London General	8-12 mins during the day, see TFL.
613	Tolworth	Glenthorne High School	Yes	London United	School Bus Service; operates only during term times
627	Worcester Park	Woodcote Green	Yes	Arriva London	School Bus Service; operates only during term times
868	Worcester Park	St Joseph's School Rosebank	Unknown	Edward Thomas and Son	School Bus Service; operates only during term times

== Notable residents ==
- Ivey Dickson, pianist and musical director.
- Vic Flick, guitarist; born Worcester Park, 1937
- Jimmy Hill, footballer for Fulham Football Club and BBC TV Football commentator.
- William Holman Hunt, 1827–1910, Pre-Raphaelite artist, painted The Light of the World at Worcester Park Farm, while staying there in the early 1850s with John Everett Millais.
- John Major – Prime Minister from 1990 to 1997, lived here as a boy at 260 Longfellow Road, Worcester Park from 1943 to 1955.
- Roger Mayer – sound engineer, most notable for his development of the fuzz box.
- Daley Thompson, British decathlete, lived near The Plough public house.
- H. G. Wells, author, lived in The Avenue.
- Kenneth Wolstenholme, BBC television sports commentator, remembered for the phrase "They think it's all over" in the 1966 FIFA World Cup Final.

== Sport and recreation ==
- Worcester Park Cricket Club, Green Lane.
- Worcester Park Athletic Club, Green Lane.
- Worcester Park Football Club, Skinner's Field on Green Lane. The club was founded in 1908.
- Cazbar FC based at the Cazbar in Central Road play at Manor Park. Cazbar FC was founded in 2008 and now plays out of the Malden Manor Pub under the same name Cazbar FC.
- Wandgas Football Club is on Grafton Road and also has cricket teams.

== Parks and open spaces ==
- Auriol Park, a King George's Field, narrowly in Stoneleigh's rail and commercial/retail catchment but in the Worcester Park post town
- Shadbolt Park, also in the borough of Epsom and Ewell.
- Dancer Dick Wood also known as Wandgas Cricket Club 100 yards north of Auriol Park.
- The Hogsmill Open Space, on the north western limit, bordering Ewell, Tolworth and Old Malden.
- Cuddington Recreation Ground on St Clair Drive in the London part.
- Mayflower Park in The Hamptons open space in the north, towards Motspur Park

== Bibliography ==
- Gover, J.E.B; Mawer, A.; Stenton, F.M. (1934). The place-names of Surrey. Cambridge: Cambridge University Press.
