= Worcester Park South =

Electoral ward in London, England

- Electoral ward for the Sutton London Borough Council
- Borough: London Borough of Sutton
- County: Greater London
- Population: 7,071 (2021)
- Major settlements: Worcester Park
- Area: 1.313 km²

Current electoral ward
- Created: 2022
- Seats: 2
- Created from: Worcester Park

Worcester Park South is an electoral ward in the London Borough of Sutton. The ward was first used in the 2022 elections and elects two councillors to the Sutton London Borough Council.

== Geography ==
The ward is named after the town of Worcester Park.

== Councillors ==
Election	Councillors	
2026	Jenna Hartley-Smith (Liberal Democrats)	Luni Sabharwal (Liberal Democrats)
2022	Martina Allen (Conservative Party)	Peter Geiringer (Conservative Party)

== Elections ==
=== 2022 ===
Worcester Park South (2)
Party	Candidate	Votes	%	±%
Conservative	Martina Allen*	1,191	51.4	
Conservative	Peter Geiringer*	1,109	47.8	
Liberal Democrats	Lauren Fivey	831	35.8	
Liberal Democrats	Barry Reed	764	33.0	
Labour	John Flowers	372	16.0	
Labour	Ann Morrison	370	16.0	
Turnout				
Conservative win (new seat)				
Conservative win (new seat)				

== See also ==
- List of electoral wards in Greater London
