= Worcester Park North =

Electoral ward in London, England

- Electoral ward for the Sutton London Borough Council
- Borough: London Borough of Sutton
- County: Greater London
- Population: 8,424 (2021)
- Major settlements: Worcester Park
- Area: 1.324 km²

Current electoral ward
- Created: 2022
- Seats: 2
- Created from: Worcester Park

Worcester Park North is an electoral ward in the London Borough of Sutton. The ward was first used in the 2022 elections and elects two councillors to the Sutton London Borough Council.

== Geography ==
The ward is named after the town of Worcester Park.

== Councillors ==
Election	Councillors	
2022	Thomas Drummond (Conservative Party)	Joe Quick (Conservative Party)

== Elections ==
=== 2022 ===
Worcester Park North (2)
Party	Candidate	Votes	%	±%
Conservative	Thomas Drummond*	1,233	47.0	
Conservative	Joe Quick	1,086	41.4	
Liberal Democrats	Jenny Batt*	919	35.0	
Liberal Democrats	James Appleby	877	33.4	
Labour	Elizabeth Martin	515	19.6	
Labour	Mehdi Kabash	380	14.5	
Green	Virginia Boyd	234	8.9	
Turnout				
Conservative win (new seat)				
Conservative win (new seat)				

== See also ==
- List of electoral wards in Greater London
