= Tom Brake =

British Liberal Democrat politician

The Right Honourable Tom Brake
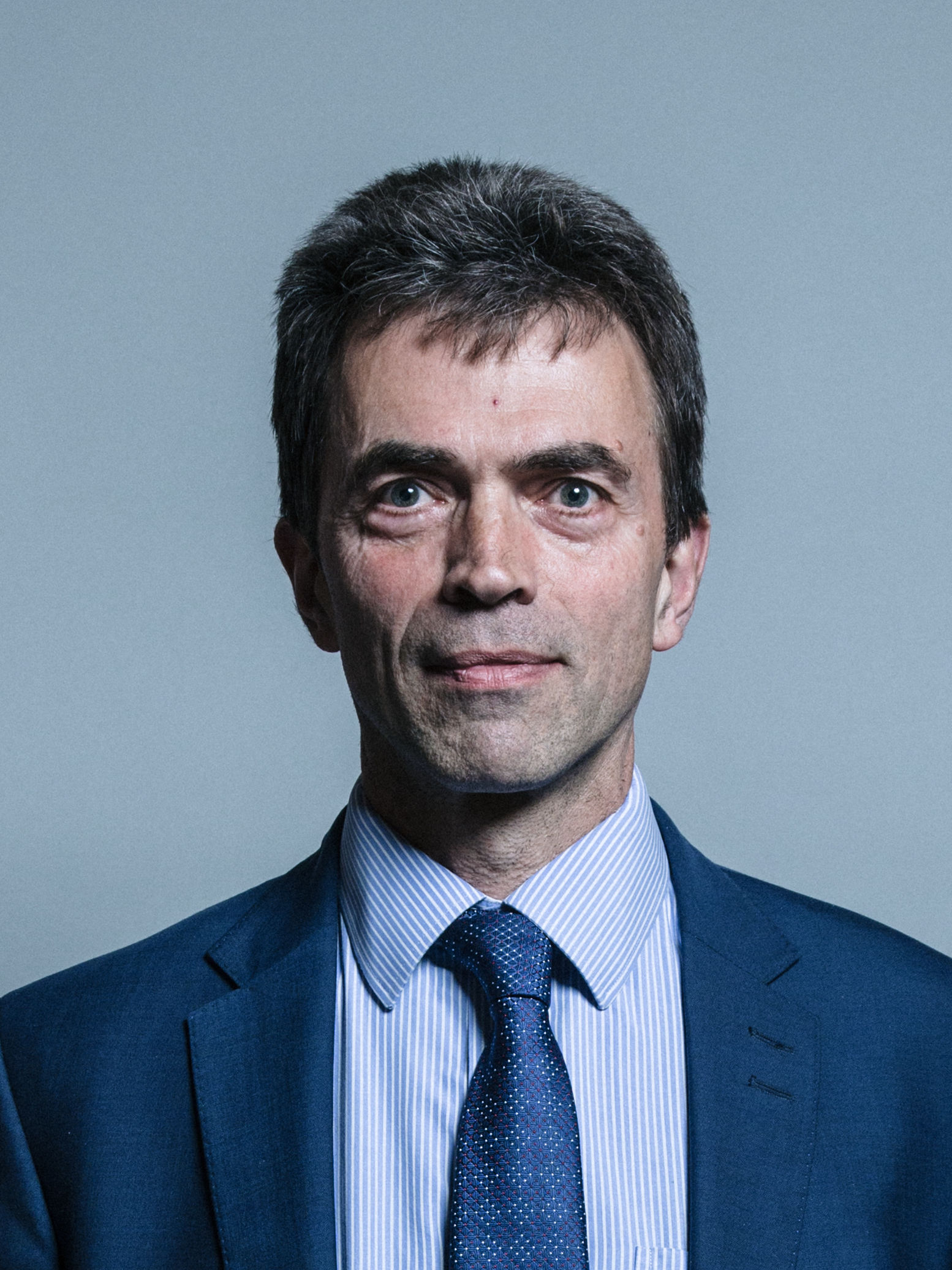
- Official portrait, 2017

Lord Commissioner of HM Treasury
- In office 4 November 2014 – 8 May 2015
- Prime Minister: David Cameron
- Preceded by: Mark Hunter
- Succeeded by: Julian Smith

Deputy Leader of the House of Commons
- In office 4 September 2012 – 8 May 2015
- Prime Minister: David Cameron
- Preceded by: David Heath
- Succeeded by: Thérèse Coffey
Lib Dem Spokesperson
Liberal Democrat Spokesman for the Duchy of Lancaster
In office 21 August 2019 – 13 December 2019
Leader	Jo Swinson
Preceded by	Office established
Succeeded by	Office abolished
Liberal Democrat Spokesperson for Exiting the European Union
In office 16 June 2017 – 13 December 2019
Leader	Tim Farron; Vince Cable; Jo Swinson
Preceded by	Nick Clegg
Succeeded by	Alistair Carmichael
Liberal Democrat Spokesperson for International Trade
In office 16 June 2017 – 21 August 2019
Leader	Tim Farron; Vince Cable; Jo Swinson
Preceded by	Nick Clegg
Succeeded by	Chuka Umunna
Liberal Democrat Spokesperson for the Office of First Secretary of State
In office 16 June 2017 – 20 December 2017
Leader	Tim Farron; Vince Cable
Preceded by	Alistair Carmichael
Succeeded by	Jo Swinson (de facto)
Liberal Democrat Spokesperson for Foreign and Commonwealth Affairs
In office 29 July 2015 – 16 June 2017
Leader	Tim Farron
Preceded by	Tim Farron
Succeeded by	Jo Swinson
Chief Whip of the Liberal Democrats
In office 29 July 2015 – 16 June 2017
Leader	Tim Farron
Preceded by	Don Foster
Succeeded by	Alistair Carmichael
Liberal Democrat Leader of the House of Commons
In office 7 January 2015 – 16 June 2017
Leader	Nick Clegg; Tim Farron
Preceded by	David Heath (2010)
Succeeded by	Wera Hobhouse (2020)
Liberal Democrat Spokesperson for Transport
In office 16 May 2005 – 8 March 2006
Leader	Charles Kennedy; Menzies Campbell
Preceded by	John Thurso
Succeeded by	Susan Kramer
Liberal Democrat Spokesperson for International Development
In office 12 October 2003 – 16 May 2005
Leader	Charles Kennedy
Preceded by	Jenny Tonge
Succeeded by	Andrew George

Member of Parliament for Carshalton and Wallington
- In office 1 May 1997 – 6 November 2019
- Preceded by: Nigel Forman
- Succeeded by: Elliot Colburn

Personal details
- Born: Thomas Anthony Brake; 6 May 1962 (age 64) Melton Mowbray, Leicestershire, England
- Party: Liberal Democrats
- Spouse: Candida Goulden (m. 1998)
- Children: 2
- Education: Imperial College London
- Website: Official website Commons website

Thomas Anthony Brake (born 6 May 1962) is a British Liberal Democrat politician. He was the Member of Parliament (MP) for Carshalton and Wallington in London from 1997 to 2019.

He was appointed Director of the cross party pressure group Unlock Democracy in October 2020.

== Early life ==
Brake was born in Melton Mowbray and moved to France when he was eight. He was educated at the Lycée International school in Saint-Germain-en-Laye in the western suburbs of Paris, and Imperial College London, where he obtained a BSc in Physics in 1983. He was a computer software consultant with Hoskyns (Capgemini) from 1983 until his election to the UK Parliament in 1997.

== Political career ==
=== Early career ===
Brake was actively involved in human rights issues as a student. He was elected as a councillor in the London Borough of Hackney in 1988, leaving the council in 1990. In 1994 Brake was elected as a councillor in the London Borough of Sutton and sat on the council until 1998.

Brake stood for election to Parliament at the 1992 general election in Carshalton and Wallington, but was defeated by Conservative Nigel Forman.

=== Parliamentary career ===
In what proved to be a close contest, Brake was elected at the 1997 general election as the Liberal Democrat MP for Carshalton and Wallington, beating Nigel Forman with a majority of 2,267, and remained MP there until he lost the seat at the 2019 general election. He made his maiden speech on 10 June 1997. Brake defeated Conservative Ken Andrew in 2001, 2005 and again in 2010 with an increased majority. In 2015 his majority was reduced to 1,510, narrowly ahead of Conservative Matthew Maxwell-Scott.

Following the 1997 election, party leader Paddy Ashdown placed Brake on the frontbench as a spokesman on the Environment, Transport and the Regions. Following the 2001 General Election, then party leader Charles Kennedy appointed him a spokesman on Transport, Local Government and the Regions. In 2002 he became a Transport spokesman. He joined the Liberal Democrat frontbench team in 2003 as the lead International Development spokesman. After the 2005 General Election he became the Transport spokesman. He was relieved of this position under the new leadership of Sir Menzies Campbell in March 2006, and later that year became spokesperson for local government. In 2007 Brake became spokesperson for London and the Olympics. In 2008 he was also appointed as a Home Affairs spokesperson.

In June 2010 Brake was named co-chair of the new Liberal Democrat Backbench Committee on Home Affairs, Justice and Equalities. Brake Co-Chaired the committee alongside Baroness Hamwee and Lord Thomas of Gresford OBE QC.

In September 2010 Brake attempted to introduce a bill "to amend the Freedom of Information Act 2000 to remove provisions permitting Ministers to overrule decisions of the Information Commissioner and Information Tribunal; to limit the time allowed for public authorities to respond to requests involving consideration of the public interest; to amend the definition of public authorities; and for connected purposes."

On 11 June 2011, it was announced Brake would be appointed a Privy Counsellor in the Queen's 2011 Birthday Honours list.

On 4 September 2012 he was appointed Deputy Leader of the House of Commons, replacing Liberal Democrat David Heath MP who was promoted to Minister of State in DEFRA. Before he was appointed Deputy Leader of the House of Commons, Brake was the Secretary of the All-Party Group for World Government, Treasurer of the All-Party Human Rights group, a member of the Franco British Parliamentary Relations group.

Between 2014 and 2015, Brake was an Assistant Whip for HM's Treasury. In January 2015, Brake was appointed to the Liberal Democrat General Election Cabinet as the party's Leader of the House of Commons and London spokesperson.

On 29 July 2015, Brake was named as foreign affairs spokesperson and party chief whip.

In June 2017, Brake was appointed as a Liberal Democrat spokesperson for international trade and European affairs.

In an interview with British-American centrist Owen Prell, who was visiting on behalf of Unite America, in Brake's Westminster office in June 2017, Brake greatly attributed the inability of his party to perform better in House of Commons elections to first-past-the-post.

Brake lost his seat in the 2019 general election to Elliot Colburn of the Conservative Party.

=== Subsequent career ===
In October 2020, Brake was appointed as the new director of Unlock Democracy, an organisation which campaigns for a more participatory democracy in Britain, founded upon a written constitution. He has said that new rules should be introduced to require MPs to publish employment agreements linked to their political activities, and meanwhile should make the information available on a voluntary basis.

He is an honorary associate of the National Secular Society.

Parliament of the United Kingdom
Preceded by Nigel Forman	Member of Parliament for Carshalton and Wallington; 1997–2019	Succeeded by Elliot Colburn
Party political offices
Preceded by Don Foster	Liberal Democrat Chief Whip of the House of Commons; 2015–2017	Succeeded by Alistair Carmichael
