= 1964 Sutton London Borough Council election =

The 1964 Sutton Council election took place on 7 May 1964 to elect members of Sutton London Borough Council in London, England. The whole council was up for election and the Conservative Party gained control of the council.

== Background ==
These elections were the first to the newly formed borough. Previously elections had taken place in the Municipal Borough of Beddington and Wallington, Municipal Borough of Sutton and Cheam and Carshalton Urban District. These boroughs and districts were joined to form the new London Borough of Sutton by the London Government Act 1963.

A total of 157 candidates stood in the election for the 51 seats being contested across 25 wards. These included a full slate from the Conservative and Labour parties, while the Liberals stood 42 candidates. Other candidates included 10 Residents and 3 Communists. There were 24 two-seat wards and 1 three-seat ward.

This election had aldermen as well as directly elected councillors. The Conservatives got 5 aldermen and Labour 3.

The Council was elected in 1964 as a "shadow authority" but did not start operations until 1 April 1965.

== Election result ==
The results saw the Conservatives gain the new council with a majority of 9 after winning 30 of the 51 seats. Overall turnout in the election was 45.0%. This turnout included 653 postal votes.

== Ward results ==
Beddington North (2)
Party	Candidate	Votes	%	±%
Turnout		2,392	59.0	
	Labour win (new seat)			
	Labour win (new seat)			

Beddington South (2)
Party	Candidate	Votes	%	±%
Turnout		2,998	53.8	
	Conservative win (new seat)			
	Conservative win (new seat)			

Belmont (2)
Party	Candidate	Votes	%	±%
Turnout		1,912	38.5	
	Conservative win (new seat)			
	Conservative win (new seat)			

Carshalton Central (2)
Party	Candidate	Votes	%	±%
Turnout		1,269	34.9	
	Conservative win (new seat)			
	Conservative win (new seat)			

Carshalton North East (3)
Party	Candidate	Votes	%	±%
Turnout		2,539	41.8	
	Labour win (new seat)			
	Labour win (new seat)			
	Labour win (new seat)			

Carshalton North West (2)
Party	Candidate	Votes	%	±%
Turnout		2,936	55.2	
	Conservative win (new seat)			
	Conservative win (new seat)			

Carshalton St Helier North (2)
Party	Candidate	Votes	%	±%
Turnout		1,720	35.9	
	Labour win (new seat)			
	Labour win (new seat)			

Carshalton St Helier South (2)
Party	Candidate	Votes	%	±%
Turnout		1,188	31.0	
	Labour win (new seat)			
	Labour win (new seat)			

Carshalton St Helier West (2)
Party	Candidate	Votes	%	±%
Turnout		1,949	41.1	
	Labour win (new seat)			
	Labour win (new seat)			

Carshalton South East (2)
Party	Candidate	Votes	%	±%
Turnout		2,417	42.9	
	Conservative win (new seat)			
	Conservative win (new seat)			

Carshalton South West (2)
Party	Candidate	Votes	%	±%
Turnout		2,146	47.8	
	Conservative win (new seat)			
	Conservative win (new seat)			

Cheam North (2)
Party	Candidate	Votes	%	±%
Turnout		2,589	49.1	
	Labour win (new seat)			
	Labour win (new seat)			

Cheam South (2)
Party	Candidate	Votes	%	±%
Turnout		1,934	36.3	
	Conservative win (new seat)			
	Conservative win (new seat)			

Cheam West (2)
Party	Candidate	Votes	%	±%
Turnout		1,852	40.0	
	Conservative win (new seat)			
	Conservative win (new seat)			

Sutton Central (2)
Party	Candidate	Votes	%	±%
Turnout		1,954	48.7	
	Labour win (new seat)			
	Labour win (new seat)			

Sutton East (2)
Party	Candidate	Votes	%	±%
Turnout		1,548	37.7	
	Conservative win (new seat)			
	Conservative win (new seat)			

Sutton North (2)
Party	Candidate	Votes	%	±%
Turnout		2,358	50.0	
	Conservative win (new seat)			
	Conservative win (new seat)			

Sutton North East (2)
Party	Candidate	Votes	%	±%
Turnout		2,457	47.8	
	Conservative win (new seat)			
	Conservative win (new seat)			

Sutton South (2)
Party	Candidate	Votes	%	±%
Turnout		1,945	33.6	
	Conservative win (new seat)			
	Conservative win (new seat)			

Sutton South East (2)
Party	Candidate	Votes	%	±%
Turnout		1,512	46.3	
	Conservative win (new seat)			
	Conservative win (new seat)			

Wallington Central (2)
Party	Candidate	Votes	%	±%
Turnout		2,451	49.0	
	Residents win (new seat)			
	Residents win (new seat)			

Wallington North (2)
Party	Candidate	Votes	%	±%
Turnout		2,227	59.0	
	Labour win (new seat)			
	Labour win (new seat)			

Wallington South (2)
Party	Candidate	Votes	%	±%
Turnout		2,584	50.4	
	Residents win (new seat)			
	Residents win (new seat)			

Worcester Park North (2)
Party	Candidate	Votes	%	±%
Turnout		3,176	49.7	
	Conservative win (new seat)			
	Conservative win (new seat)			

Worcester Park South (2)
Party	Candidate	Votes	%	±%
Turnout		2,394	46.0	
	Conservative win (new seat)			
	Conservative win (new seat)			
