= Sutton College =

Information
- Former names: SCOLA Sutton College of Learning for Adults (2001–2015) Sutton College of Liberal Arts (1972–2001)
- Established: 1972
- Local authority: London Borough of Sutton
- Principal: Tom Dillon
- Website: https://www.suttoncollege.ac.uk/

Sutton College (born 2015) formerly known as Sutton College of Learning for Adults (SCOLA, 2001–2015) and Sutton College of Liberal Arts (1972–2001), is a college based in the Borough of Sutton in London, England. The college offers over 1000 part-time courses for all adults of any age. It operates out of two main centres and other community venues throughout the borough

The college grew out of an earlier organization, which offered adult and young adult education classes as early as the 1900s in the borough of Sutton. As of the 1920s, it was known as the Sutton and Cheam School of Art and in the 1950s as Sutton and Cheam School of Art and Crafts. A core group of full-time and part-time staff from the School of Art moved to the new Sutton College in 1972. The first Principal of Sutton College was Peter Batten.

The current site in Sutton was built in 1972 as a dedicated adult education facility. Before that, the school was situated on Throwley Road, Sutton, but that site was demolished in 1969. The school then moved temporarily to Stowford School, Brighton Rd, Sutton. The school also ran classes from various locations including Nonsuch Mansion, Carew Manor and many schools in the borough.

== History ==
In 1900, The Boys' Grammar School on Throwley Road in Sutton began to offer evening classes in art for older part-time students. In 1929, the Boys' school moved to Manor Lane, Sutton and the art program became a department of The Evening Institute, which took over the Throwley Road premises. By 1934, the school of art occupied the full premises at Throwley Road, and had 261 students (28 full-time, 233 part-time). By this time it was known as the Sutton and Cheam School of Art.

As of 1965, the London Borough of Sutton took responsibility for running the school and its adult education program, under the Local Government Act of 1964. In 1969, the school of art at Throwley Road was closed and the building demolished. The school was temporarily relocated to Stowford School, Brighton Rd, Sutton. Classes were taught there and at other locations such as Nonsuch Mansion, Stanley Park, Wallington Public Hall and the Granada in Sutton until a new building for the Sutton College of Liberal Arts could be completed. Construction began in 1972, and the Sutton College of Liberal Arts opened its new building in 1974. It is now known simply as Sutton College.

== Main centres ==
- Sutton Civic Centre, next to the main library

== Business unit ==
In part to national government demands that educational establishments create better links with employers, SCOLA introduced its SCOLA Business Unit, to provide courses both at its centres and at businesses.

== Future Plans ==
In October 2022 Sutton Council announced its plans to sell off the Civic Centre:

“The existing Civic Centre site - which includes the council’s offices, Sutton Library, and Sutton College, as well as the Gibson Road Car Park and the disused Secombe Theatre - will be sold and could be used for new homes, including affordable housing.”
