= 2018 Sutton London Borough Council election =

- 3 May 2018

All 54 seats to Sutton London Borough Council 28 seats needed for a majority

	First party	Second party
Party	Liberal Democrats	Conservative
Last election	45 seats, 43.0%	11 seats, 29.8%
Seats won	33	18
Seat change	▼12	▲9
Popular vote	69,320	64,945
Percentage	38.8%	36.3%
Swing	▼4.2%	▲6.5%
- Map of the results of the 2018 Sutton council election. Conservatives in blue, Liberal Democrats in yellow and Independents in grey.
Council control before election
Liberal Democrats
Council control after election
Liberal Democrats

The 2018 Sutton Council election took place on 3 May 2018 to elect members of Sutton Council in London. This was on the same day as other local elections.

== Results ==
The Liberal Democrats retained control winning 33 seats (−12) with the Conservatives winning 18 seats (+9) and independent candidates winning 3 seats from the Liberal Democrats in Beddington North.

Sutton local election result 2018
Party	Seats	Gains	Losses	Net gain/loss	Seats %	Votes %	Votes	+/−
Liberal Democrats	33	1	13	−12	61.1	38.8	69,320	−4.2
Conservative	18	10	1	+9	33.3	36.3	64,945	+6.5
Labour	0	0	0	0	0.0	17.8	31,753	+3.2
Green	0	0	0	0	0.0	2.5	4,478	−0.5
Independent	3	3	0	+3	5.6	2.3	4,128	+2.2
UKIP	0	0	0	0	0.0	2.3	4,083	−6.0
CPA	0	0	0	0	0.0	0.0	69	−0.1
National Front	0	0	0	0	0.0	0.0	49	New

== Ward results ==
=== Beddington North ===
Beddington North
Party	Candidate	Votes	%	±%
Independent	Nick Mattey *	1,285	36.3	−2.0
Independent	Tim Foster	1,047	29.6	N/A
Independent	Jillian Green	948	26.8	N/A
Conservative	Malcolm Brown	911	25.7	+2.7
Liberal Democrats	Pat Ali*	837	23.7	−14.8
Labour	Sarah Gwynn	829	23.4	+4.0
Conservative	Alison Huneke	829	23.4	+2.5
Conservative	Andy Williams	784	22.2	+2.2
Labour	John Key	725	20.5	+2.7
Liberal Democrats	Brendan Hudson	713	20.1	−18.2
Labour	Charlie Mansell	663	18.7	+1.8
Liberal Democrats	Nighat Piracha*	660	18.6	−12.5
Green	Shasha Khan	208	5.9	−1.7
UKIP	Hannah Hamilton	106	3.0	−20.1
UKIP	Kingsley Hamilton	94	2.7	N/A
Rejected ballots		4		
Turnout		3,543	43.85	
Independent gain from Liberal Democrats		Swing		
Independent gain from Liberal Democrats		Swing		
Independent gain from Liberal Democrats		Swing		

=== Beddington South ===
Beddington South
Party	Candidate	Votes	%	±%
Liberal Democrats	Edward Joyce*	1,450	44.8	+8.3
Liberal Democrats	Manuel Abellan*	1,445	44.6	+12.1
Liberal Democrats	Mo Saqib	1,403	43.3	+13.8
Conservative	Neil Garratt*	1,334	41.2	+7.5
Conservative	Ann Page	1,239	38.2	+9.7
Conservative	Jim Simms	1,226	37.8	+6.4
Labour	Christine Cullen	492	15.2	+1.2
Labour	Arnaldo Savignani	421	13.0	−0.2
Labour	Alan Tate	380	11.7	−1.2
UKIP	Peter Smith	134	4.1	−19.6
UKIP	David Usher	107	3.3	N/A
UKIP	Terence Smith	105	3.2	N/A
Rejected ballots		8		
Turnout		3,248	38.42	
Liberal Democrats hold		Swing		
Liberal Democrats hold		Swing		
Liberal Democrats gain from Conservative		Swing		

=== Belmont ===
Belmont
Party	Candidate	Votes	%	±%
Conservative	David Hicks*	2,001	61.1	+10.8
Conservative	Patrick McManus*	1,900	58.0	+12.2
Conservative	Jane Pascoe*	1,836	56.0	+14.5
Liberal Democrats	Dean Juster	956	29.2	+2.9
Liberal Democrats	Alex Vicente-Machado	786	24.0	−0.1
Liberal Democrats	Abdullah Okuyucu	748	22.8	+0.8
Labour	Gale Blears	595	18.2	+5.3
Labour	Margaret Sinclair	524	16.0	+3.9
Labour	Marian Wingrove	503	15.3	+4.1
Rejected ballots		10		
Turnout		3,287	41.39	
Conservative hold		Swing		
Conservative hold		Swing		
Conservative hold		Swing		

=== Carshalton Central ===
Carshalton Central
Party	Candidate	Votes	%	±%
Liberal Democrats	Jill Whitehead*	1,673	45.3	+7.5
Liberal Democrats	Chris Williams	1,646	44.5	+2.2
Liberal Democrats	Jake Short	1,576	42.6	+4.6
Conservative	Lynne Fletcher	1,384	37.4	+9.5
Conservative	Matthew Drew	1,302	35.2	+9.6
Conservative	Ethan Smith	1,289	34.9	+9.7
Labour Co-op	Marilynne Burbage	459	12.4	+2.2
Labour Co-op	Margaret Onians	441	11.9	+2.0
Labour Co-op	Tony Thorpe	430	11.6	+2.5
Green	Karin Andrews	334	9.0	+1.0
Green	Bob Steel	255	6.9	−1.5
Green	Gay McDonagh	238	6.4	+1.1
CPA	Ashley Keith	69	1.9	−0.4
Rejected ballots		4		
Turnout		3,701	45.32	
Liberal Democrats hold		Swing		
Liberal Democrats hold		Swing		
Liberal Democrats hold		Swing		

=== Carshalton South and Clockhouse ===
Carshalton South and Clockhouse
Party	Candidate	Votes	%	±%
Liberal Democrats	Amy Haldane*	1,809	47.9	+12.7
Conservative	Moira Butt*	1,767	46.8	+9.2
Conservative	Tim Crowley*	1,747	46.3	+6.4
Conservative	Melissa Pearce	1,596	42.3	+10.5
Liberal Democrats	Gordon Roxburgh	1,544	40.9	+6.0
Liberal Democrats	Jason Reynolds	1,524	40.4	+10.1
Labour	John Clay	376	10.0	−0.1
Labour	Anas Khan	343	9.1	−
Labour	Christine Savignani	340	9.0	+1.9
Green	Ross Hemingway	295	7.8	−5.6
Rejected ballots		6		
Turnout		3,782	48.37	
Liberal Democrats hold		Swing		
Conservative hold		Swing		
Conservative hold		Swing		

=== Cheam ===
Cheam
Party	Candidate	Votes	%	±%
Conservative	Holly Ramsey*	2,202	58.5	+15.6
Conservative	Eric Allen	2,066	54.9	+16.9
Conservative	Elliot Colburn	1,900	50.5	+19.9
Liberal Democrats	Mary Burstow*	1,711	45.4	+0.6
Liberal Democrats	Anisha Callaghan	1,292	34.3	+1.9
Liberal Democrats	Monica Tyler	1,253	33.3	+3.9
Labour	Victoria Barlow	315	8.4	+2.2
Labour	Jane Rodger	288	7.6	+1.0
Labour	Helen Martin	287	7.6	+2.3
Rejected ballots		10		
Turnout		3,775	45.29	
Conservative gain from Liberal Democrats		Swing		
Conservative hold		Swing		
Conservative hold		Swing		

=== Nonsuch ===
Nonsuch
Party	Candidate	Votes	%	±%
Conservative	Martina Allen	1,681	45.7	+12.2
Conservative	Peter Geiringer	1,466	39.9	+8.1
Conservative	James McDermott-Hill	1,405	38.2	+8.0
Liberal Democrats	Samantha Bourne*	1,405	38.2	−4.8
Liberal Democrats	Richard Broadbent*	1,287	35.0	−3.7
Liberal Democrats	Cliff Mason	1,243	33.8	−1.5
Independent	Richard Johnson	848	23.1	N/A
Labour	Kirsty Archer	542	14.7	+4.6
Labour	Kerrie Peek	370	10.1	+2.0
Labour	Karon Whitham	334	9.1	+1.4
UKIP	Howard Cowley	189	5.1	−17.1
UKIP	Bill Goddard	138	3.8	N/A
UKIP	David Taffurelli	126	3.4	N/A
Rejected ballots		4		
Turnout		3,680	44.63	
Conservative gain from Liberal Democrats		Swing		
Conservative gain from Liberal Democrats		Swing		
Conservative gain from Liberal Democrats		Swing		

As James McDermott-Hill (Conservative) and Samantha Bourne (Lib Dems) were tied on 1,405 votes each. Lots were drawn and McDermott-Hill won the seat.

=== St Helier ===
St Helier
Party	Candidate	Votes	%	±%
Liberal Democrats	Jean Crossby*	1,063	41.8	+0.7
Liberal Democrats	Martin Gonzalez*	977	38.4	+1.6
Liberal Democrats	Annie Moral	922	36.3	−0.4
Labour	Nick Diamantis	876	34.5	+9.3
Labour	Maggie Hughes	800	31.5	+8.0
Labour	Patrick Sim	745	29.3	+7.5
Conservative	Steven Ayres	583	22.9	+9.8
Conservative	Simon Densley	513	20.2	+9.2
Conservative	Simon Higgs	497	19.6	+9.1
UKIP	John Brereton	255	10.0	−19.0
UKIP	Eleanor Smith	180	7.1	N/A
UKIP	Ian Rawat	178	7.0	N/A
National Front	Richard Edmonds	49	1.9	N/A
Rejected ballots		8		
Turnout		2,549	29.21	
Liberal Democrats hold		Swing		
Liberal Democrats hold		Swing		
Liberal Democrats hold		Swing		

=== Stonecot ===
Stonecot
Party	Candidate	Votes	%	±%
Conservative	Jed Dwight	1,505	44.8	+17.1
Conservative	Param Nandha	1,414	42.1	+14.5
Conservative	Ryan Stoneman	1,374	40.9	+20.9
Liberal Democrats	Nick Emmerson*	1,087	32.4	−6.4
Liberal Democrats	Miguel Javelot*	969	28.9	−5.9
Liberal Democrats	Peter Okenla	921	27.4	−14.2
Labour	Ray Eveleigh	699	20.8	+6.9
Labour	Paul Prior	663	19.7	+8.3
Labour	Gerald Tasker	558	16.6	+5.6
Green	Claire Jackson-Prior	262	7.8	−1.2
Green	Cumar Saha	254	7.6	N/A
UKIP	Glen Roberts	147	4.4	−21.2
UKIP	Simon Stuart	121	3.6	N/A
UKIP	Nicholas Smith	106	3.2	N/A
Rejected ballots		6		
Turnout		3,363	40.01	
Conservative gain from Liberal Democrats		Swing		
Conservative gain from Liberal Democrats		Swing		
Conservative gain from Liberal Democrats		Swing		

=== Sutton Central ===
Sutton Central
Party	Candidate	Votes	%	±%
Liberal Democrats	David Bartolucci*	1,259	40.3	−6.5
Liberal Democrats	Rich Clare	1,236	39.6	−3.5
Liberal Democrats	Ali Mirhashem*	1,114	35.7	−2.0
Labour	Steve Adams	1,082	34.6	+13.7
Labour	Bonnie Craven	961	30.8	+13.4
Labour	Vic Paulino	905	29.0	+13.8
Conservative	Nigel Cornwell	789	25.3	+10.7
Conservative	Marie Grant	756	24.2	+11.2
Conservative	Alan Plant	727	23.3	+5.5
Green	Peter Friel	293	9.4	−2.3
UKIP	Jess Beadle	154	4.9	−13.6
UKIP	Charlie Wood	112	3.6	N/A
Rejected ballots		8		
Turnout		3,132	33.69	
Liberal Democrats hold		Swing		
Liberal Democrats hold		Swing		
Liberal Democrats hold		Swing		

=== Sutton North ===
Sutton North
Party	Candidate	Votes	%	±%
Liberal Democrats	Ruth Dombey*	1,350	42.1	−7.5
Liberal Democrats	Marlene Heron*	1,263	39.4	−6.6
Liberal Democrats	Stephen Penneck*	1,222	38.1	−4.1
Conservative	Emma Scully	1,134	35.3	+13.1
Conservative	Vikki Shields	1,032	32.2	+12.5
Conservative	Terry Woods	1,021	31.8	+16.4
Labour	Teresa O'Brien	754	23.5	+8.5
Labour	Emily Brothers	742	23.1	+8.5
Labour	Victoria Richer	681	21.2	+8.8
UKIP	Andrew Beadle	155	4.8	+18.5
UKIP	Julie Beach	140	4.4	N/A
UKIP	Ernest Ford	140	4.4	N/A
Rejected ballots		4		
Turnout		3,213	39.68	
Liberal Democrats hold		Swing		
Liberal Democrats hold		Swing		
Liberal Democrats hold		Swing		

=== Sutton South ===
Sutton South
Party	Candidate	Votes	%	±%
Conservative	Tony Shields*	1,383	44.3	+8.0
Liberal Democrats	Richard Clifton*	1,347	43.1	+1.2
Liberal Democrats	Trish Fivey*	1,303	41.7	+2.4
Conservative	Vanessa Udall	1,295	41.5	+8.5
Conservative	David Slaughter	1,285	41.1	+8.5
Liberal Democrats	Ed Parsley	1,187	38.0	+6.5
Labour	Tessa Cornell	566	18.1	+8.9
Labour	Kathryn Brennan	554	17.7	+6.4
Labour	Ronald Phillips	475	15.2	+5.9
Rejected ballots		12		
Turnout		3,136	39.12	
Conservative hold		Swing		
Liberal Democrats hold		Swing		
Liberal Democrats hold		Swing		

=== Sutton West ===
Sutton West
Party	Candidate	Votes	%	±%
Conservative	Catherine Gray	1,334	39.8	+15.5
Conservative	Lily Bande	1,326	39.6	+16.0
Liberal Democrats	Kevin Burke*	1,288	38.4	−9.4
Conservative	Mukesh Rao	1,227	36.6	+15.9
Liberal Democrats	Wendy Mathys*	1,206	36.0	−6.8
Liberal Democrats	Simon Wales*	1,190	35.5	−5.8
Labour	Andy Cook	806	24.0	+9.5
Labour	Laura Mullaney	713	21.3	+8.3
Labour	Christopher Woolmer	672	20.0	+8.2
Green	Peter Hickson	300	8.9	N/A
Rejected ballots		3		
Turnout		3,355	39.72	
Conservative gain from Liberal Democrats		Swing		
Conservative gain from Liberal Democrats		Swing		
Liberal Democrats hold		Swing		

=== The Wrythe ===
The Wrythe
Party	Candidate	Votes	%	±%
Liberal Democrats	Colin Stears*	1,324	46.8	+1.3
Liberal Democrats	Sam Weatherlake	1,249	44.2	−1.5
Liberal Democrats	Nali Patel*	1,224	43.3	+2.5
Conservative	Will Curley	760	26.9	+9.4
Conservative	Millie Shields	747	26.4	+9.8
Conservative	Sebastian Wopinski	659	23.3	+10.4
Labour	Sheila Berry	533	18.9	+3.4
Labour	Carlos De Sousa	498	17.6	+3.5
Labour	Paul McCarthy	476	16.8	+4.3
Green	Penelope Mouncey	204	7.2	−3.1
UKIP	John Bannon	196	6.9	−18.8
Green	Michael Boulton	187	6.6	N/A
UKIP	Bill Main-Ian	177	6.3	N/A
UKIP	Gino Marotta	129	4.6	N/A
Green	Phillip Mouncey	121	4.3	N/A
Rejected ballots		2		
Turnout		2,829	34.09	
Liberal Democrats hold		Swing		
Liberal Democrats hold		Swing		
Liberal Democrats hold		Swing		

=== Wallington North ===
Wallington North
Party	Candidate	Votes	%	±%
Liberal Democrats	Sunita Gordon*	1,637	50.2	+13.3
Liberal Democrats	Marian James*	1,587	48.6	+14.9
Liberal Democrats	Joyce Melican*	1,505	46.1	+10.5
Conservative	Charlotte Leonard	912	27.9	−
Conservative	Lynn Robertson	888	27.2	+3.8
Conservative	Christopher Wortley	827	25.3	+5.4
Labour	Michael McLoughlin	594	18.2	+5.5
Labour	Mary Towler	526	16.1	+4.0
Labour	David Towler	516	15.8	+4.6
Green	Verity Thomson	300	9.2	−
Green	Mark Webb	222	6.8	−0.8
UKIP	Malcolm Horne	119	3.6	−18.7
UKIP	Angela North	104	3.2	N/A
UKIP	Vivien Worsfold	72	2.2	N/A
Rejected ballots		10		
Turnout		3,274	37.76	
Liberal Democrats hold		Swing		
Liberal Democrats hold		Swing		
Liberal Democrats hold		Swing		

=== Wallington South ===
Wallington South
Party	Candidate	Votes	%	±%
Liberal Democrats	Steve Cook	1,793	53.5	+7.4
Liberal Democrats	Jayne McCoy*	1,704	50.8	+5.7
Liberal Democrats	Muhammad Sadiq*	1,588	47.3	+12.0
Conservative	Daryl Brisley	1,233	36.8	+12.9
Conservative	Hilary Wortley	1,089	32.5	+13.7
Conservative	Omoniyi Giwa	978	29.2	+12.7
Labour	David Murray	506	15.1	+4.3
Labour	Bobbie Lambert	413	12.3	+1.9
Green	Maeve Tomlinson	404	12.0	+3.3
Labour	Callum Roper	373	11.1	+2.9
Rejected ballots		10		
Turnout		3,364	41.45	
Liberal Democrats hold		Swing		
Liberal Democrats hold		Swing		
Liberal Democrats hold		Swing		

=== Wandle Valley ===
Wandle Valley
Party	Candidate	Votes	%	±%
Liberal Democrats	Benjamin Andrew	1,128	41.6	+2.3
Liberal Democrats	Vincent Galligan	1,057	39.0	+8.7
Liberal Democrats	Hanna Zuchowska*	950	35.0	+3.4
Labour	David Grant	883	32.6	+8.6
Labour	Margaret Thomas	826	30.5	+6.8
Labour	Ahmad Wattoo	723	26.7	+5.2
Conservative	David Jeffreys	475	17.5	+2.7
Conservative	Ross Taylor	461	17.0	+5.7
Conservative	Julia Russell	451	16.6	+5.9
UKIP	Barry Greening	245	9.0	−20.5
Green	Peter Alfrey	229	8.4	−4.5
Green	Helen Heathfield	206	7.6	N/A
UKIP	Mark Nicholson	180	6.6	N/A
UKIP	Stewart Wood	174	6.4	N/A
Green	Gina Mudge	166	6.1	N/A
Rejected ballots		10		
Turnout		2,722	31.20	
Liberal Democrats hold		Swing		
Liberal Democrats hold		Swing		
Liberal Democrats hold		Swing		

=== Worcester Park ===
Worcester Park
Party	Candidate	Votes	%	±%
Liberal Democrats	Jenny Batt	1,759	47.6	+9.4
Conservative	Tom Drummond	1,539	41.7	+9.7
Liberal Democrats	Drew Heffernan	1,489	40.3	+3.5
Liberal Democrats	Sam Martin	1,461	39.6	+6.7
Conservative	Bob Miah	1,459	39.5	+8.5
Conservative	Paul Newman	1,421	38.5	+9.5
Labour	Liz Martin	714	19.3	+7.6
Labour	John Evers	711	19.3	+7.3
Labour	Ann Morrison	552	14.9	+4.2
Rejected ballots		14		
Turnout		3,707	39.68	
Liberal Democrats hold		Swing		
Conservative gain from Liberal Democrats		Swing		
Liberal Democrats hold		Swing		

== By-Elections ==
Belmont By-Election 25 October 2018
Party	Candidate	Votes	%	±%
Conservative	Neil Garratt	1,328	46.7	▼9.6
Liberal Democrats	Dean Juster	1,069	37.6	▲10.7
Labour	Marian Wingrove	303	10.7	▼6.1
Green	Claire Jackson-Prior	63	2.2	N/A
UKIP	John Bannon	50	1.8	N/A
CPA	Ashley Dickenson	30	1.1	N/A
Rejected ballots		11		
Majority		259	9.1	▼20.3
Turnout		2843	31.2	▼10.0
Conservative hold		Swing	▼10.2	

Wallington North By-Election 28 March 2019
Party	Candidate	Votes	%	±%
Liberal Democrats	Barry Lewis	1,039	38.2	▼7.8
Conservative	Charlotte Leonard	709	26.1	▲0.5
Independent	Gervais Sawyer	381	14.0	N/A
Labour	Sheila Berry	301	11.1	▼5.6
Green	Verity Thomson	166	6.1	▼2.3
UKIP	John Bannon	104	3.8	▲0.5
CPA	Ashley Dickenson	17	0.6	N/A
Rejected ballots		9		
Majority		330	12.1	▼8.3
Turnout		2,717	31.3	▼6.5
Liberal Democrats hold		Swing	▼4.2	
