= 2014 Sutton London Borough Council election =

2014 local election in England

Map of the results of the 2014 Sutton council election. Conservatives in blue and Liberal Democrats in yellow.

The 2014 Sutton Council election took place on 22 May 2014 to elect members of Sutton Council in England. This was on the same day as other local elections.

== Results ==
The Liberal Democrats retained control winning 45 seats (+2) with the Conservatives winning 9 seats (−2).

Sutton local election result 2014
| Party | Seats | Gains | Losses | Net gain/loss | Seats % | Votes % | Votes | +/− |
|---|---|---|---|---|---|---|---|---|
| Liberal Democrats | 45 | ▲2 | Steady | ▲2 | 83 | 43 | | |
| Conservative | 9 | Steady | ▼2 | ▼2 | 17 | 30 | | |
| Labour | 0 | Steady | Steady | Steady | 0 | 15 | | |
| UKIP | 0 | Steady | Steady | Steady | 0 | 8 | | |
| Green | 0 | Steady | Steady | Steady | 0 | 3 | | |
| Keep Our St. Helier Hospital Party | 0 | Steady | Steady | Steady | 0 | <1 | | |
| TUSC | 0 | Steady | Steady | Steady | 0 | <1 | | |
| Independent | 0 | Steady | Steady | Steady | 0 | <1 | | |
| English Democrat | 0 | Steady | Steady | Steady | 0 | <1 | | |
| CPA | 0 | Steady | Steady | Steady | 0 | <1 | | |

== Ward results ==
=== Beddington North ===
Beddington North
| Party | Candidate | Votes | % | ±% |
|---|---|---|---|---|
| Liberal Democrats | Pat Ali | 1,299 | 38.5 | −4.4 |
| Liberal Democrats | Nick Mattey | 1,290 | 38.3 | −7.2 |
| Liberal Democrats | Nighat Piracha | 1,048 | 31.1 | −11.6 |
| UKIP | Leslie Price | 779 | 23.1 | N/A |
| Conservative | Hilary Wortley | 776 | 23.0 | −13.9 |
| Conservative | Anusha Vamadeva | 705 | 20.9 | −12.2 |
| Conservative | Leon Emirali | 673 | 20.0 | −9.0 |
| Labour | Sarah Gwynn | 654 | 19.4 | +7.0 |
| Labour | Margaret Hughes | 600 | 17.8 | +8.2 |
| Labour | Nawaz Ahmad | 570 | 16.9 | +5.9 |
| Green | Joan Hartfield | 257 | 7.6 | +0.6 |
| Green | Frederick Hartfield | 235 | 7.0 | N/A |
| Turnout | | 3,372 | 42.4 | −28.8 |
| Liberal Democrats hold | | Swing | | |
| Liberal Democrats hold | | Swing | | |
| Liberal Democrats hold | | Swing | | |

In January 2016, Cllr Mattey was expelled from the Liberal Democrats after sighting his vocal opposition to a proposed incinerator which is set to be erected in the ward.

=== Beddington South ===
Beddington South
| Party | Candidate | Votes | % | ±% |
|---|---|---|---|---|
| Liberal Democrats | Ed Joyce | 1,215 | 36.5 | −7.2 |
| Conservative | Neil Garratt | 1,120 | 33.7 | −7.5 |
| Liberal Democrats | Manuel Abellan | 1,079 | 32.5 | −8.8 |
| Conservative | Jim Simms | 1,045 | 31.4 | −7.5 |
| Liberal Democrats | Abdullah Okuyucu | 982 | 29.5 | −6.9 |
| Conservative | Andy Williams | 949 | 28.5 | −9.7 |
| UKIP | Bill Main-Ian | 788 | 23.7 | N/A |
| Labour | Mary Towler | 464 | 14.0 | +2.0 |
| Labour | Patrick Sim | 440 | 13.2 | +2.2 |
| Labour | Alfred Thomas | 430 | 12.9 | +4.0 |
| Turnout | | 3,325 | 40.9 | −26.0 |
| Liberal Democrats hold | | Swing | | |
| Conservative hold | | Swing | | |
| Liberal Democrats hold | | Swing | | |

=== Belmont ===
Belmont
| Party | Candidate | Votes | % | ±% |
|---|---|---|---|---|
| Conservative | David Hicks | 1,687 | 50.3 | +3.4 |
| Conservative | Patrick McManus | 1,534 | 45.8 | +0.4 |
| Conservative | Jane Pascoe | 1,389 | 41.5 | −0.5 |
| Liberal Democrats | Barbara McIntosh | 881 | 26.3 | −13.1 |
| Liberal Democrats | Cherry Mattey | 809 | 24.1 | −7.7 |
| Liberal Democrats | Russell Neale | 738 | 22.0 | −15.2 |
| UKIP | Adrian Noble | 653 | 19.5 | +8.4 |
| Labour | Gale Blears | 432 | 12.9 | +3.6 |
| Labour | Stephen Blears | 406 | 12.1 | +4.7 |
| Labour | Marian Wingrove | 376 | 11.2 | +5.1 |
| Turnout | | 3,351 | 42.8 | −32.0 |
| Conservative hold | | Swing | | |
| Conservative hold | | Swing | | |
| Conservative hold | | Swing | | |

=== Carshalton Central ===
Carshalton Central
| Party | Candidate | Votes | % | ±% |
|---|---|---|---|---|
| Liberal Democrats | Hamish Pollock | 1,634 | 42.3 | −5.9 |
| Liberal Democrats | Alan Salter | 1,469 | 38.0 | −6.8 |
| Liberal Democrats | Jill Whitehead | 1,460 | 37.8 | −5.0 |
| Conservative | Simon Higgs | 1,077 | 27.9 | −9.3 |
| Conservative | Arthur Spirling | 989 | 25.6 | −11.0 |
| Conservative | Penny Spirling | 974 | 25.2 | −5.9 |
| UKIP | Michael Norman | 671 | 17.4 | N/A |
| Labour | Michael Cawley | 393 | 10.2 | +0.7 |
| Labour | Margaret Onians | 384 | 9.9 | +2.3 |
| Labour | Alan Tate | 351 | 9.1 | +1.9 |
| Green | Bob Steel | 324 | 8.4 | +1.4 |
| Green | Andrew Lindsay | 309 | 8.0 | +2.5 |
| Green | Mandi Suheimat | 205 | 5.3 | +1.6 |
| CPA | Ashley Dickenson | 90 | 2.3 | N/A |
| TUSC | Allan Matusevics | 74 | 1.9 | N/A |
| Turnout | | 3,866 | 48.5 | −26.6 |
| Liberal Democrats hold | | Swing | | |
| Liberal Democrats hold | | Swing | | |
| Liberal Democrats hold | | Swing | | |

=== Carshalton South & Clockhouse ===
Carshalton South & Clockhouse
| Party | Candidate | Votes | % | ±% |
|---|---|---|---|---|
| Conservative | Tim Crowley | 1,449 | 39.9 | −4.3 |
| Conservative | Moira Butt | 1,365 | 37.6 | −5.3 |
| Liberal Democrats | Amy Haldane | 1,276 | 35.2 | −4.8 |
| Liberal Democrats | Peter Fosdike | 1,268 | 34.9 | −8.0 |
| Conservative | Tony Smith | 1,155 | 31.8 | −10.5 |
| Liberal Democrats | Alex Vicente-Machado | 1,100 | 30.3 | −9.1 |
| UKIP | Alexandra Wraith | 617 | 17.0 | N/A |
| Green | Ross Hemingway | 488 | 13.4 | N/A |
| Labour | Marilynne Burbage | 366 | 10.1 | +1.2 |
| Labour | David Davis | 331 | 9.1 | +1.4 |
| Labour | Claire Shearer | 259 | 7.1 | −1.9 |
| Green | Brian Dougherty | 245 | 6.7 | N/A |
| Turnout | | 3,630 | 47.2 | −28.8 |
| Conservative hold | | Swing | | |
| Conservative hold | | Swing | | |
| Liberal Democrats hold | | Swing | | |

=== Cheam ===
Cheam
| Party | Candidate | Votes | % | ±% |
|---|---|---|---|---|
| Liberal Democrats | Mary Burstow | 1,761 | 44.8 | −5.6 |
| Conservative | Holly Ramsey | 1,688 | 42.9 | −3.5 |
| Conservative | Graham Whitham | 1,495 | 38.0 | −6.9 |
| Liberal Democrats | Abigail Lock | 1,273 | 32.4 | −6.2 |
| Conservative | Misdaq Zaidi | 1,205 | 30.6 | −10.6 |
| Liberal Democrats | Simon Youlton | 1,156 | 29.4 | −3.7 |
| UKIP | Steve Carpenter | 595 | 15.1 | N/A |
| UKIP | Angus Dalgleish | 569 | 14.5 | N/A |
| Keep Our St Helier Hospital Party | David Ash | 396 | 10.1 | N/A |
| Labour | Alan Aylward | 244 | 6.2 | +1.7 |
| Labour | Laura Herridge | 236 | 6.0 | +2.1 |
| Labour | Lyndon Edwards | 207 | 5.3 | +0.9 |
| Turnout | | 3,934 | 48.6 | −27.8 |
| Liberal Democrats hold | | Swing | | |
| Conservative hold | | Swing | | |
| Conservative hold | | Swing | | |

=== Nonsuch ===
Nonsuch
| Party | Candidate | Votes | % | ±% |
|---|---|---|---|---|
| Liberal Democrats | Samantha Bourne | 1,744 | 43.0 | −3.6 |
| Liberal Democrats | Richard Broadbent | 1,570 | 38.7 | −6.3 |
| Liberal Democrats | Daniel Sangster | 1,431 | 35.3 | −7.3 |
| Conservative | Eric Allen | 1,361 | 33.5 | −9.7 |
| Conservative | Alan Plant | 1,291 | 31.8 | −9.8 |
| Conservative | Rona Forzani | 1,226 | 30.2 | −10.1 |
| UKIP | Howard Cowley | 901 | 22.2 | N/A |
| Labour | Laura Mullaney | 408 | 10.1 | +3.8 |
| Labour | Marcus Papadopoulos | 330 | 8.1 | +2.5 |
| Labour | Shawn Buck | 311 | 7.7 | +1.7 |
| Turnout | | 4,057 | 48.8 | −25.3 |
| Liberal Democrats hold | | Swing | | |
| Liberal Democrats hold | | Swing | | |
| Liberal Democrats gain from Conservative | | Swing | | |

=== St. Helier ===
St. Helier
| Party | Candidate | Votes | % | ±% |
|---|---|---|---|---|
| Liberal Democrats | Jean Crossby | 1,195 | 41.1 | −10.6 |
| Liberal Democrats | Martin Gonzalez | 1,070 | 36.8 | −10.9 |
| Liberal Democrats | Doug Hunt | 1,069 | 36.7 | −8.0 |
| UKIP | Michael Lyon | 843 | 29.0 | +17.0 |
| Labour | Nicola Rosenbaum | 734 | 25.2 | +7.7 |
| Labour | John Keys | 685 | 23.5 | +7.0 |
| Labour | Andrew Theobald | 637 | 21.9 | +5.7 |
| Conservative | Lottie Crowley | 380 | 13.1 | −8.4 |
| Conservative | Alan Oliver | 320 | 11.0 | −10.1 |
| Conservative | Alison Huneke | 306 | 10.5 | −6.3 |
| Turnout | | 2,910 | 34.7 | −23.4 |
| Liberal Democrats hold | | Swing | | |
| Liberal Democrats hold | | Swing | | |
| Liberal Democrats hold | | Swing | | |

=== Stonecot ===
Stonecot
| Party | Candidate | Votes | % | ±% |
|---|---|---|---|---|
| Liberal Democrats | Adrian Davey | 1,440 | 41.6 | −12.0 |
| Liberal Democrats | Nick Emmerson | 1,341 | 38.8 | −8.4 |
| Liberal Democrats | Miguel Javelot | 1,205 | 34.8 | −9.7 |
| Conservative | Malcolm Brown | 958 | 27.7 | −4.5 |
| Conservative | Graham Jarvis | 953 | 27.6 | −4.3 |
| UKIP | Lorraine Crawley | 886 | 25.6 | N/A |
| Conservative | Sheena Munsami | 691 | 20.0 | −11.5 |
| Labour | Victoria Barlow | 482 | 13.9 | +2.7 |
| Labour | Tessa Cornell | 395 | 11.4 | +2.7 |
| Labour | Bill Lang | 380 | 11.0 | +2.9 |
| Green | David Booth | 311 | 9.0 | N/A |
| TUSC | Livvy Najman | 74 | 2.1 | N/A |
| Turnout | | 3,458 | 42.0 | −29.3 |
| Liberal Democrats hold | | Swing | | |
| Liberal Democrats hold | | Swing | | |
| Liberal Democrats hold | | Swing | | |

=== Sutton Central ===
Sutton Central
| Party | Candidate | Votes | % | ±% |
|---|---|---|---|---|
| Liberal Democrats | David Bartolucci | 1,480 | 46.8 | −8.7 |
| Liberal Democrats | Vincent Galligan | 1,365 | 43.1 | −4.4 |
| Liberal Democrats | Ali Mirhashem | 1,192 | 37.7 | −7.4 |
| Labour | Emily Brothers | 662 | 20.9 | +4.1 |
| UKIP | Jake Grogan | 584 | 18.5 | N/A |
| Conservative | Charles Cornwell | 563 | 17.8 | −11.3 |
| Labour | Charles Mansell | 550 | 17.4 | +6.0 |
| Labour | Vic Paulino | 480 | 15.2 | +5.7 |
| Conservative | Nigel Cornwell | 463 | 14.6 | −13.1 |
| Conservative | Marie Grant | 412 | 13.0 | −9.1 |
| Green | Simon Honey | 369 | 11.7 | +3.0 |
| TUSC | Pauline Gorman | 90 | 2.8 | N/A |
| Turnout | | 3,164 | 38.5 | −26.2 |
| Liberal Democrats hold | | Swing | | |
| Liberal Democrats hold | | Swing | | |
| Liberal Democrats hold | | Swing | | |

=== Sutton North ===
Sutton North
| Party | Candidate | Votes | % | ±% |
|---|---|---|---|---|
| Liberal Democrats | Ruth Dombey | 1,658 | 49.6 | −3.3 |
| Liberal Democrats | Marlene Heron | 1,539 | 46.0 | −3.6 |
| Liberal Democrats | Stephen Penneck | 1,410 | 42.2 | −5.5 |
| UKIP | Stewart Wood | 781 | 23.3 | N/A |
| Conservative | Alec Beeson | 742 | 22.2 | −11.7 |
| Conservative | Millie Shields | 659 | 19.7 | −14.1 |
| Conservative | Mukesh Rao | 516 | 15.4 | −14.6 |
| Labour | Kathy Allen | 502 | 15.0 | +4.5 |
| Labour | Ann Morrison | 420 | 12.6 | +4.2 |
| Labour | Dawn Lever | 416 | 12.4 | +5.0 |
| Turnout | | 3,345 | 42.6 | −26.9 |
| Liberal Democrats hold | | Swing | | |
| Liberal Democrats hold | | Swing | | |
| Liberal Democrats hold | | Swing | | |

=== Sutton South ===
Sutton South
| Party | Candidate | Votes | % | ±% |
|---|---|---|---|---|
| Liberal Democrats | Richard Clifton | 1,380 | 41.9 | −3.5 |
| Liberal Democrats | Trish Fivey | 1,296 | 39.3 | −5.1 |
| Conservative | Tony Shields | 1,197 | 36.3 | −5.8 |
| Conservative | Jason Hughes | 1,089 | 33.0 | −6.5 |
| Conservative | Heather Howell | 1,075 | 32.6 | −6.6 |
| Liberal Democrats | John Phillips | 1,040 | 31.5 | −9.2 |
| UKIP | Jerry Wraith | 418 | 12.7 | +7.2 |
| Keep Our St Helier Hospital Party | Tiz North | 372 | 11.3 | N/A |
| Labour | Kathryn Brennan | 371 | 11.3 | +1.3 |
| Labour | Ronald Phillips | 307 | 9.3 | +0.7 |
| Labour | Patricia Simons | 302 | 9.2 | +1.4 |
| TUSC | Steve Appleton | 108 | 3.3 | N/A |
| Turnout | | 3,297 | 43.2 | −25.8 |
| Liberal Democrats hold | | Swing | | |
| Liberal Democrats hold | | Swing | | |
| Conservative hold | | Swing | | |

=== Sutton West ===
Sutton West
| Party | Candidate | Votes | % | ±% |
|---|---|---|---|---|
| Liberal Democrats | Kevin Burke | 1,648 | 47.8 | +1.0 |
| Liberal Democrats | Wendy Mathys | 1,477 | 42.8 | −5.3 |
| Liberal Democrats | Simon Wales | 1,424 | 41.3 | −6.4 |
| Conservative | Richard Butt | 836 | 24.3 | −11.5 |
| Conservative | Mary Edwards | 815 | 23.6 | −11.8 |
| Conservative | Jonathan Pritchard | 712 | 20.7 | −9.9 |
| UKIP | Glen Roberts | 540 | 15.7 | N/A |
| Labour | Andy Cook | 501 | 14.5 | +5.6 |
| Labour | Maria Ponto | 448 | 13.0 | +5.1 |
| Labour | Margaret Sinclair | 406 | 11.8 | +4.6 |
| Keep Our St Helier Hospital Party | Frances Cornford | 358 | 10.4 | N/A |
| Turnout | | 3,447 | 42.0 | −28.5 |
| Liberal Democrats hold | | Swing | | |
| Liberal Democrats hold | | Swing | | |
| Liberal Democrats hold | | Swing | | |

=== The Wrythe ===
The Wrythe
| Party | Candidate | Votes | % | ±% |
|---|---|---|---|---|
| Liberal Democrats | Callum Morton | 1,341 | 45.7 | −3.3 |
| Liberal Democrats | Colin Stears | 1,337 | 45.5 | −5.0 |
| Liberal Democrats | Naliben Patel | 1,199 | 40.8 | −3.1 |
| UKIP | Chris Howe | 754 | 25.7 | N/A |
| Conservative | Benjamin Scully | 513 | 17.5 | −12.2 |
| Conservative | Charles Manton | 487 | 16.6 | −11.6 |
| Labour | Deirdre Barry | 455 | 15.5 | +4.0 |
| Labour | Alex Milligan | 415 | 14.1 | +2.9 |
| Conservative | Marion Williams | 378 | 12.9 | −13.3 |
| Labour | Tony Thorpe | 365 | 12.4 | +1.3 |
| Green | Derek Coleman | 303 | 10.3 | +2.9 |
| Turnout | | 2,936 | 40.1 | −26.7 |
| Liberal Democrats hold | | Swing | | |
| Liberal Democrats hold | | Swing | | |
| Liberal Democrats hold | | Swing | | |

=== Wallington North ===
Wallington North
| Party | Candidate | Votes | % | ±% |
|---|---|---|---|---|
| Liberal Democrats | Sunita Gordon | 1,363 | 36.9 | −8.3 |
| Liberal Democrats | Joyce Melican | 1,317 | 35.6 | −12.8 |
| Liberal Democrats | Marian Radford | 1,247 | 33.7 | −3.3 |
| Conservative | Elliot Colburn | 1,033 | 27.9 | −4.9 |
| Conservative | James McDermott-Hill | 865 | 23.4 | −9.1 |
| UKIP | Carole Lander | 823 | 22.3 | +10.8 |
| Conservative | Omonlyl Giwa | 737 | 19.9 | −8.8 |
| Labour | Victoria Rosenbaum | 470 | 12.7 | +2.4 |
| Labour | Richard Smith | 447 | 12.1 | +2.5 |
| Labour | Peter Turner | 415 | 11.2 | +2.1 |
| Green | Jim Duffy | 341 | 9.2 | +1.7 |
| Green | Penny Mouncey | 280 | 7.6 | +2.3 |
| Green | Phil Mouncey | 205 | 5.5 | +2.1 |
| Turnout | | 3,696 | 44.0 | −27.0 |
| Liberal Democrats hold | | Swing | | |
| Liberal Democrats hold | | Swing | | |
| Liberal Democrats hold | | Swing | | |

=== Wallington South ===
Wallington South
| Party | Candidate | Votes | % | ±% |
|---|---|---|---|---|
| Liberal Democrats | Colin Hall | 1,593 | 46.1 | −2.4 |
| Liberal Democrats | Jayne McCoy | 1,558 | 45.1 | +0.2 |
| Liberal Democrats | Muhammad Sadiq | 1,221 | 35.3 | −13.9 |
| Conservative | Steven Ayres | 825 | 23.9 | −10.9 |
| UKIP | Marion Houghton | 694 | 20.1 | N/A |
| Conservative | Christopher Wortley | 649 | 18.8 | −15.1 |
| Conservative | Stephen Odunton | 571 | 16.5 | −14.5 |
| Keep Our St Helier Hospital Party | David Murray | 377 | 10.9 | N/A |
| Labour | David Towler | 374 | 10.8 | +2.4 |
| Labour | Susan Theobald | 358 | 10.4 | +0.1 |
| Green | Maeve Tomlinson | 301 | 8.7 | −1.3 |
| Labour | Jas Weir | 283 | 8.2 | −1.8 |
| Green | Rosa Rajendran | 274 | 7.9 | N/A |
| English Democrat | David Jeffreys | 110 | 3.2 | N/A |
| Turnout | | 3,455 | 43.1 | −27.7 |
| Liberal Democrats hold | | Swing | | |
| Liberal Democrats hold | | Swing | | |
| Liberal Democrats hold | | Swing | | |

=== Wandle Valley ===
Wandle Valley
| Party | Candidate | Votes | % | ±% |
|---|---|---|---|---|
| Liberal Democrats | Margaret Court | 1,156 | 39.3 | −11.3 |
| Liberal Democrats | Hanna Zuchowska | 929 | 31.6 | −15.2 |
| Liberal Democrats | Jason Reynolds | 891 | 30.3 | −16.5 |
| UKIP | Graham Murray | 867 | 29.5 | N/A |
| Labour | Stephen McGrane | 705 | 24.0 | +6.7 |
| Labour | Bonnie Craven | 697 | 23.7 | +8.6 |
| Labour | Michael Craven | 633 | 21.5 | +6.9 |
| Conservative | James England | 436 | 14.8 | −10.5 |
| Green | Stephen Hart | 380 | 12.9 | +5.2 |
| Conservative | Jonathan Downer | 333 | 11.3 | −9.2 |
| Conservative | Peter Wootten | 314 | 10.7 | −9.6 |
| Turnout | | 2,943 | 35.0 | −25.1 |
| Liberal Democrats hold | | Swing | | |
| Liberal Democrats hold | | Swing | | |
| Liberal Democrats hold | | Swing | | |

=== Worcester Park ===
Worcester Park
| Party | Candidate | Votes | % | ±% |
|---|---|---|---|---|
| Liberal Democrats | Arthur Hookway | 1,508 | 38.2 | −7.6 |
| Liberal Democrats | Richard Marston | 1,455 | 36.8 | −1.5 |
| Liberal Democrats | Paul Wingfield | 1,300 | 32.9 | −5.1 |
| Conservative | Stuart Mackay | 1,264 | 32.0 | −6.6 |
| Conservative | Simon Densley | 1,226 | 31.0 | −7.3 |
| Conservative | Gino Marotta | 1,146 | 29.0 | −8.3 |
| UKIP | Han-Ley Tang | 768 | 19.4 | +10.5 |
| Labour | John Evers | 474 | 12.0 | +2.2 |
| Labour | Hilary Hosking | 462 | 11.7 | +3.2 |
| Labour | David Hosking | 421 | 10.7 | +1.6 |
| Independent | Richard Edmonds | 185 | 4.7 | N/A |
| Turnout | | 3,950 | 43.7 | −27.9 |
| Liberal Democrats hold | | Swing | | |
| Liberal Democrats gain from Conservative | | Swing | | |
| Liberal Democrats hold | | Swing | | |
