= Sutton London Borough Council =

Local authority for the London Borough of Sutton

- Coat of arms

- Council logo

Type
- Type: London borough council of the London Borough of Sutton
- Houses: Unicameral

Leadership
- Mayor: Muhammad Sadiq, Liberal Democrat since 26 May 2026
- Leader: Barry Lewis, Liberal Democrat since 20 May 2024
- Chief Executive: Helen Bailey since 2019

Structure
- Seats: 55 councillors
- Graph of the party split among 55 seats.
- Political groups: Administration (51) Liberal Democrats (51) Other parties (4) Reform (2) Labour (1) Independent (1)
- Length of term: Whole council elected every four years

Elections
- Voting system: Plurality at-large (FPTP)
- Last election: 7 May 2026
- Next election: 2 May 2030

Meeting place
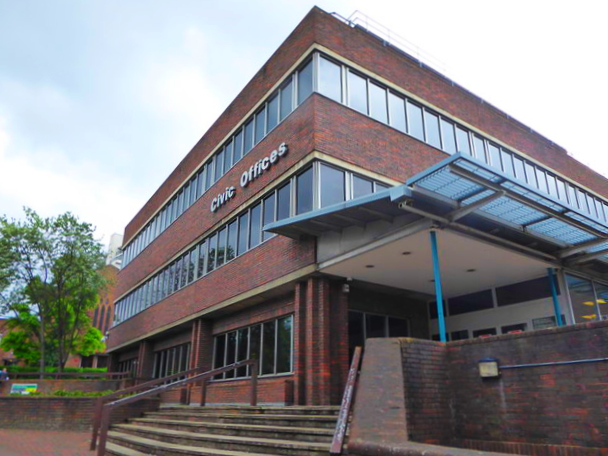
- Civic Offices, St Nicholas Way, Sutton, SM1 1EA

Website
- www.sutton.gov.uk

Sutton London Borough Council, also known as Sutton Council, is the local authority for the London Borough of Sutton in Greater London, England. The council is responsible for providing a range of services within the borough. The council has been under Liberal Democrat majority control since 1990. The council is based at the Civic Offices in Sutton.

== History ==
The London Borough of Sutton and its council were created under the London Government Act 1963, with the first election held in 1964. For its first year the council acted as a shadow authority alongside the area's three outgoing authorities, being the municipal borough councils of Sutton and Cheam and Beddington and Wallington, and the urban district council of Carshalton. The new council formally came into its powers on 1 April 1965, at which point the old districts and their councils were abolished.

The council's full legal name is "The Mayor and Burgesses of the London Borough of Sutton".

From 1965 until 1986 the council was a lower-tier authority, with upper-tier functions provided by the Greater London Council. The split of powers and functions meant that the Greater London Council was responsible for "wide area" services such as fire, ambulance, flood prevention, and refuse disposal; with the boroughs (including Sutton) responsible for "personal" services such as social care, libraries, cemeteries and refuse collection. As an outer London borough council Sutton has been a local education authority since 1965. The Greater London Council was abolished in 1986 and its functions passed to the London Boroughs, with some services provided through joint committees.

Since 2000 the Greater London Authority has taken some responsibility for highways and planning control from the council, but within the English local government system the council remains a "most purpose" authority in terms of the available range of powers and functions.

== Powers and functions ==
The local authority derives its powers and functions from the London Government Act 1963 and subsequent legislation, and has the powers and functions of a London borough council. It sets council tax and as a billing authority it also collects precepts for Greater London Authority functions and business rates. It sets planning policies which complement Greater London Authority and national policies, and decides on almost all planning applications accordingly. It is also the local education authority.

== Political control ==
The council has been under Liberal Democrat majority control since 1990.

The first election was held in 1964, initially operating as a shadow authority alongside the outgoing authorities until it came into its powers on 1 April 1965. Political control of the council since 1965 has been as follows:

Party in control	Years
Conservative	1965–1971
No overall control	1971–1974
Conservative	1974–1986
No overall control	1986–1990
Liberal Democrats	1990–present

=== Leadership ===
The role of Mayor of Sutton is largely ceremonial. Political leadership is instead provided by the leader of the council. The leaders since 1965 have been:

Councillor	Party	From	To
Tag Taylor	Conservative	1965	1973
John Charles Cox	Conservative	1973	1976
Robin Squire	Conservative	1976	1980
David Trafford	Conservative	1980	1986
Graham Tope	Liberal	1986	1988
Graham Tope	Liberal Democrats	1988	1999
Mike Cooper	Liberal Democrats	1999	16 Oct 2002
Sean Brennan	Liberal Democrats	18 Nov 2002	21 May 2012
Ruth Dombey	Liberal Democrats	21 May 2012	20 May 2024
Barry Lewis	Liberal Democrats	20 May 2024	

=== Composition ===
Following the 2026 election, the composition of the council was:

Party	Councillors
Liberal Democrats	51
Reform	2
Labour	1
Independent	1
Total	55

The next election is due in 2030.

== Elections ==
Since the last boundary changes in 2022 the council has comprised 55 councillors representing 20 wards, with each ward electing two or three councillors. Elections are held every four years.

=== Wards ===

1. Beddington (3)
2. Belmont (3)
3. Carshalton Central (3)
4. Carshalton South & Clockhouse (3)
5. Cheam (3)
6. Hackbridge (2)
7. North Cheam (3)
8. South Beddington & Roundshaw (3)
9. St Helier East (2)
10. St Helier West (3)
11. Stonecot (2)
12. Sutton Central (3)
13. Sutton North (3)
14. Sutton South (3)
15. Sutton West & East Cheam (3)
16. The Wrythe (3)
17. Wallington North (3)
18. Wallington South (3)
19. Worcester Park North (2)
20. Worcester Park South (2)

== Premises ==
The council is based at the Civic Offices on St Nicholas Way in the centre of Sutton. The building was purpose-built for the council in phases between 1972 and 1975. In 2022 the council announced plans to develop a new headquarters on part of the site of the St Nicholas Shopping Centre on the High Street.
