= July 1954 =

Month of 1954

| << | July 1954 | | | | | >> |
| Su | Mo | Tu | We | Th | Fr | Sa |
| | | | | 1 | 2 | 3 |
| 4 | 5 | 6 | 7 | 8 | 9 | 10 |
| 11 | 12 | 13 | 14 | 15 | 16 | 17 |
| 18 | 19 | 20 | 21 | 22 | 23 | 24 |
| 25 | 26 | 27 | 28 | 29 | 30 | 31 |

The following events occurred in July 1954:

== July 1, 1954 (Thursday) ==
- Japan's National Security Board was reorganized as the Defense Agency, and the Japan Self-Defense Forces were established.
- The Nordic Passport Union was extended to allow citizens of the union to live and work in any of the four countries without a residence or work permit.
- The United States officially began using the international unit of the nautical mile, equal to 6,076.11549 ft. or 1,852 metres.
- Two men were killed when a United States Army plane crashed during a Reserve Officer Training Corps training flight at Kelly Air Force Base, Texas. One of the dead men was John McBride, a promising University of Alabama American football player.
- A North American X-10 plane, GM-19308, c/n 2, on Navaho X-10 flight number 7, developed a fire on board, crashed and burned eight minutes out of Edwards AFB, California.
- WDBO (now WCPX) TV channel 6 in Orlando, FL (CBS) began broadcasting.
- Died:
  - Thea von Harbou, 65, German actress and screenwriter
  - Hugh A. Butler, 76, United States Senator from Nebraska, died after a stroke.

== July 2, 1954 (Friday) ==
- A ballot of Welsh local authorities, carried out by the South Wales Daily News, revealed a preference for Cardiff as the official capital of Wales.

== July 3, 1954 (Saturday) ==
- Following the death of Nebraska Senator Hugh A. Butler two days earlier, Samuel W. Reynolds was appointed by Governor Robert B. Crosby to the United States Senate to fill the open seat. Reynolds' career would be short as he chose to return to his wholesale coal business when elections took place in November 1954.
- Died: Reginald Marsh, 56, US artist

== July 4, 1954 (Sunday) ==
- Food rationing in Great Britain ended with the lifting of restrictions on sale and purchase of meat, 14 years after it began early in World War II and nearly a decade after the war's end.
- In the "Miracle of Bern", West Germany beat Hungary 3–2 at the Wankdorf Stadium in Bern, Switzerland, to win the 1954 FIFA World Cup.

== July 5, 1954 (Monday) ==
- The Andhra Pradesh High Court was officially inaugurated in India by the country's Home Minister, Kailash Nath Katju.
- The BBC broadcast the UK's first television news bulletin.
- Elvis Presley's first single, "That's All Right", was recorded by Sun Records in Memphis, Tennessee.
- Born:
  - Jimmy Crespo, US guitarist and songwriter; in Brooklyn, New York City
  - John Wright, New Zealand cricketer and coach; in Darfield, New Zealand

== July 6, 1954 (Tuesday) ==
- The Singapore-registered cargo ship Cherry Venture was driven aground in a storm at Teewah Beach, Australia, where it would remain until scrapped in 2007. The captain and the crew of 24 people and two monkeys survived.
- KMOS TV channel 6 in Sedalia-Warrensburg, MO (PBS) began broadcasting.
- Born: Willie Randolph, American baseball player and manager; in Holly Hill, South Carolina
- Died: Gabriel Pascal, 60, Hungarian film producer and director

== July 7, 1954 (Wednesday) ==
- The Onslow by-election to the 30th New Zealand Parliament, caused by the death of Harry Combs, was rendered unnecessary in the absence of anyone having come forward by the closing date to oppose Labour candidate Henry May, who was declared elected.
- Dewey Phillips of WHBQ (AM) in Memphis became the first radio announcer to broadcast a recording of Elvis Presley. The track "That's All Right" (later pressed as Sun 209) was recorded two days earlier. Upon hearing that his debut record was about to be aired, Presley hid in a movie theater, thinking he would become a laughingstock.

== July 8, 1954 (Thursday) ==
- KMOX (now KMOV) TV channel 4 in Saint Louis, MO (CBS) did their first broadcast.
- Died: George Gardiner (or Gardner), 77, Irish boxer, first undisputed World Light Heavyweight Champion

== July 9, 1954 (Friday) ==
- After two years' study of problems that might be encountered in human spaceflight, a joint group - NACA, Air Force, and Navy - met in Washington, D.C., to discuss the need for a hypersonic research vehicle and to decide on the type of aircraft that could attain these objectives. The NACA proposal was accepted in December 1954, and a formal memorandum of understanding was signed to initiate the X-15 project. Technical direction of the project was assigned to the NACA.
- Born: Kevin O'Leary, Canadian entrepreneur

== July 10, 1954 (Saturday) ==
- 23-year-old Peter Thomson won the British Open golf championship, becoming the first Australian to do so.
- Born:
  - Andre Dawson, American baseball player; in Miami
  - Neil Tennant, British singer-songwriter and record producer; in North Shields
  - Yō Yoshimura, Japanese voice actor (d. 1991)

== July 11, 1954 (Sunday) ==
- Died: Henry Valentine Knaggs, 95, English physician and author

== July 12, 1954 (Monday) ==
- The Panamanian cargo ship San Mardeno ran aground and sank off Saurashtra, India, resulting in the death of her captain. The remaining 42 crew members were rescued.

== July 13, 1954 (Tuesday) ==
- The 1954 Lake of Two Mountains boating accident led to the drowning deaths of twelve children in Lake of Two Mountains, Montreal, Quebec.
- Born: Ray Bright, Australian cricketer; in Melbourne
- Died:

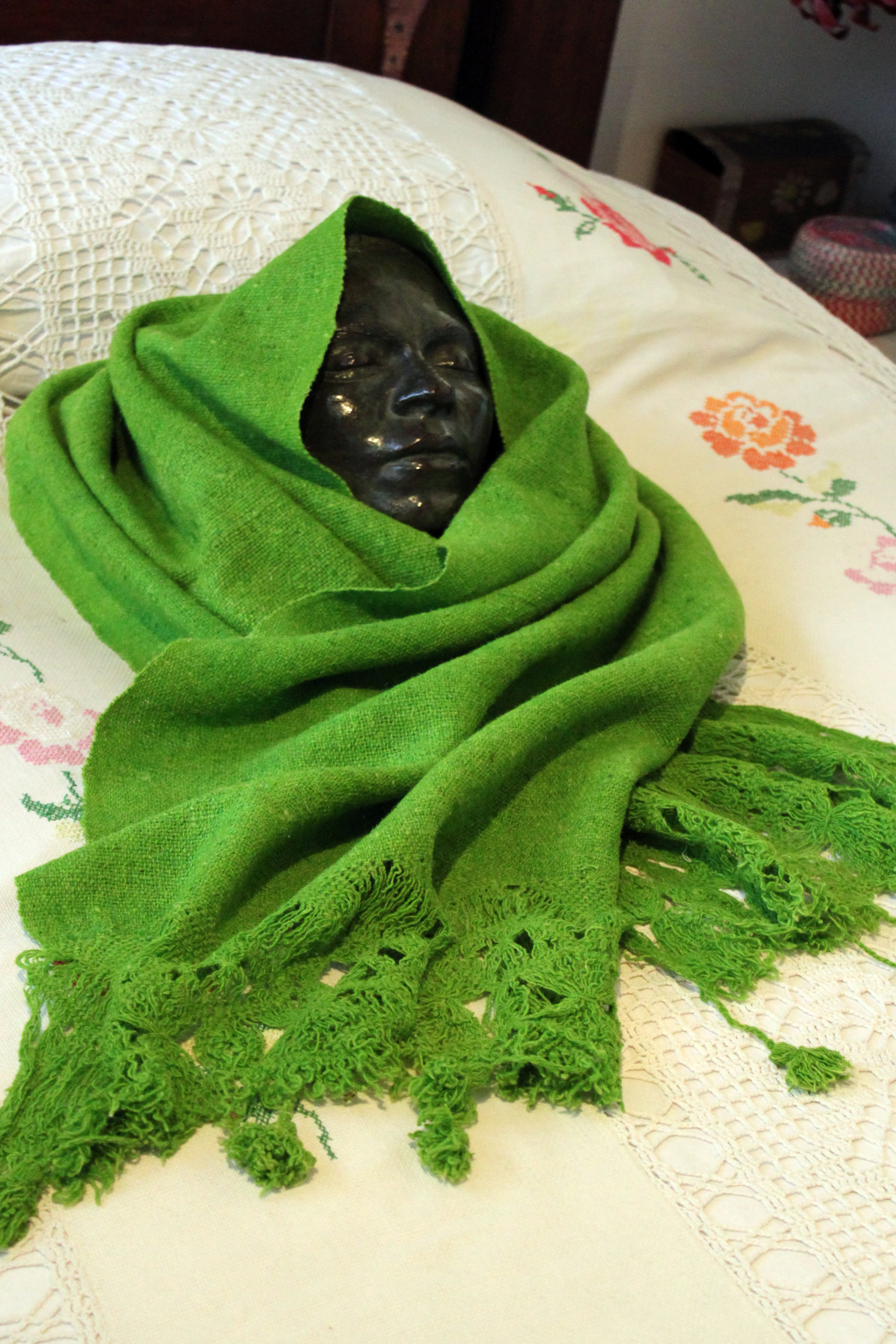
Frida Kahlo's death mask on her bed at La Casa Azul

  - Frida Kahlo, 47, Mexican painter, died of a pulmonary embolism (or possibly by suicide) at La Casa Azul, the house in Mexico City where she was born.
  - Irving Pichel, 63, US actor and director
  - Grantland Rice, 73, US sports writer

== July 14, 1954 (Wednesday) ==
- The first prototype of the Handley Page Victor bomber was lost when the tail became detached during a low-level pass over the runway at Cranfield, UK, causing the aircraft to crash with the loss of the crew.
- Died:
  - Jacinto Benavente, 87, Spanish writer and Nobel laureate
  - Jackie Saunders, 61, American silent screen actress

== July 15, 1954 (Thursday) ==
- The maiden flight of the Boeing 367-80 (or Dash 80), prototype of the Boeing 707 series, took place.
- Juan Fangio, the Argentine driver for German Grand Prix team Mercedes-Benz, broke the lap record for the Silverstone Circuit with an average speed of 100.35 miles per hour (161.50 km/h), the previous record being 100.16 miles per hour (161.19 km/h).
- KOCO TV channel 5 in Oklahoma City, OK (ABC) and WBOC TV channel 16 in Salisbury, MD (CBS/NBC/ABC) began broadcasting.

== July 16, 1954 (Friday) ==
- A partial lunar eclipse took place.
- Died:
  - Henri Frankfort, 57, Dutch Egyptologist, archaeologist and orientalist
  - Herms Niel, 66, German composer

== July 17, 1954 (Saturday) ==
- Argentine driver José Froilán González won the 1954 British Grand Prix at Silverstone.
- Born:
  - Angela Merkel, Chancellor of Germany; in Hamburg
  - Edward Natapei, Vanuatuan politician, 6th Prime Minister of Vanuatu (d. 2015)
- Died: Machine Gun Kelly (George Kelly Barnes), 59, US gangster, died of a heart attack.

== July 18, 1954 (Sunday) ==
- France's prime minister, Pierre Mendès France, obtained an assurance from Chinese leader Zhou Enlai that he would cease to support some of the Viet Minh claims, in the interests of achieving peace in Indochina.

== July 19, 1954 (Monday) ==
- Sun Records released Elvis Presley's first single, "That's All Right", in the United States.

== July 20, 1954 (Tuesday) ==
- The 1954 Geneva Conference ended after nearly two months, resulting in the partition of Vietnam.
- Born: Dave Shaw, Australian commercial aviator and cave diver (d. 2005)

== July 21, 1954 (Wednesday) ==
- First Indochina War: The Geneva Conference sent French forces to the south, and Vietnamese forces to the north, of a demarcation line. The agreement led to the establishment of the communist regime of North Vietnam and the state of South Vietnam.

== July 22, 1954 (Thursday) ==
- The first-ever meltdown of a nuclear reactor was deliberately initiated as part of Argonne National Laboratory's BORAX experiments at the National Reactor Testing Station in Idaho.
- WTHI TV channel 10 in Terre Haute, IN (CBS) began broadcasting.

== July 26, 1954 (Monday) ==
- A US Air Force pilot, Lieutenant Floyd C. Nugent, suffered a landing gear problem while flying a Vought F7U-3 Cutlass, so he aimed the jet out to sea and ejected. The plane flew on for almost 30 minutes, circling Naval Air Station North Island and the Hotel del Coronado, before ditching near the shore.
- WCET TV channel 48 in Cincinnati, OH (PBS) began broadcasting.
- Born: Vitas Gerulaitis, US tennis player; in Brooklyn, New York (d. 1994)

== July 27, 1954 (Tuesday) ==
- The second Avro Vulcan prototype was badly damaged when it swung off the runway upon landing at Farnborough, UK.
- Born: Lynne Frederick, British actress (d. 1994)

== July 28, 1954 (Wednesday) ==
- Born:
  - Hugo Chávez, President of Venezuela; in Sabaneta, Barinas (d. 2013)
  - Gerd Faltings, German mathematician; in Buer
- Died: Sojin (Sōjin Kamiyama), 70, Japanese film star during the American silent film era

== July 29, 1954 (Thursday) ==
- The construction of Yad Vashem, an official memorial center to commemorate the victims of the persecution of the Jews by the Nazis and their accomplices in Europe, began in Jerusalem.
- Tropical Storm Barbara made landfall near Vermilion Bay, Louisiana, United States, causing some flooding and some damage to the local rice crop.
- Died: Coen de Koning, 75, Dutch speed skater (b. 1879)

== July 30, 1954 (Friday) ==
- The Television Act 1954 received Royal Assent, enabling the creation of a commercial television service in the UK.

== July 31, 1954 (Saturday) ==
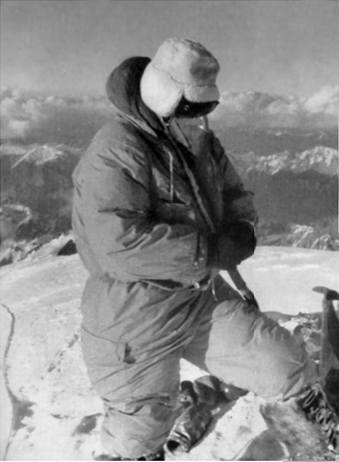
Achille Compagnoni

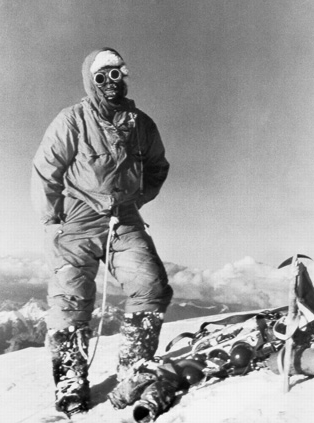
Lino Lacedelli

Summit photographs of Compagnoni and Lacedelli
- On an Italian expedition to K2, mountaineers Lino Lacedelli and Achille Compagnoni became the first two people to reach the summit of the second highest mountain in the world.
- The Patea by-election to the 30th New Zealand Parliament, brought about by the resignation of William Sheat, resulted in Sheat being re-elected as an Independent candidate.
