= February 1955 =

Month of 1955

<<	February 1955					>>
Su	Mo	Tu	We	Th	Fr	Sa
		1	2	3	4	5
6	7	8	9	10	11	12
13	14	15	16	17	18	19
20	21	22	23	24	25	26
27	28

The following events occurred in February 1955:

== February 2, 1955 (Wednesday) ==
- Died: Sir Paul Dalrymple Butler KCMG, 68, British diplomat

== February 3, 1955 (Thursday) ==
- Died: Vasily Blokhin, 60, Russian general

== February 4, 1955 (Friday) ==
- The Pact of Mutual Cooperation ("Baghdad Pact") was signed.
- British Navy W-class destroyer HMS Wrangler ran aground at Villefranche sur Mer, France. She would be refloated on 6 February by Marine Nationale and Marina Militare tugs.

== February 5, 1955 (Saturday) ==
- An Australian National Antarctic Research Expeditions party led by Phillip Law visited a small island lying north of the Bølingen Islands and 5 kilometres (2.5 nmi) northwest of Cleft Island in southern Prydz Bay, Antarctica, which they named Lichen Island for the rich growth of lichens found there.
- Born: Debra Jo Fondren, American model and actress, Playmate of the Month September 1977 and Playmate of the Year 1978, in Los Angeles

== February 6, 1955 (Sunday) ==
- Born:
  - John Kuester, American basketball player and coach
  - Micheal Pollan, American journalist, author, and academic
  - Bruno Stolorz, French rugby player and coach

== February 7, 1955 (Monday) ==
- Born: Miguel Ferrer, American actor, in Santa Monica, California (d. 2017, throat cancer)
- Died: William J. Whittemore, 94, American painter

== February 8, 1955 (Tuesday) ==
- Nikolai Bulganin became the new Chairman of the Council of Ministers of the Soviet Union, succeeding Georgy Malenkov.

== February 9, 1955 (Wednesday) ==
- Apartheid in South Africa: 60,000 non-white residents of the Sophiatown suburb of Johannesburg were forcibly evicted.
- Twenty nautical miles (37 km) southeast of the Tachen Islands, the People's Republic of China shot down a U.S. Navy AD Skyraider attack aircraft covering the evacuation of Nationalist Chinese forces from the islands.
- In Italy, the Rome Metro opened to passengers.

== February 10, 1955 (Thursday) ==
- The United States Seventh Fleet helped the Republic of China evacuate Chinese Nationalist army and residents from the Tachen Islands to Taiwan.
- Born: Chris Adams, English wrestler and judoka (d. 2001)

== February 11, 1955 (Friday) ==
- Died: Ona Munson, 51, American actress

== February 12, 1955 (Saturday) ==
- U.S. President Dwight D. Eisenhower sent the first U.S. advisors to South Vietnam.
- Died:
  - Thomas J. Moore, 71, Irish-American film actor
  - S. Z. Sakall, 72, Hungarian actor

== February 13, 1955 (Sunday) ==
- Sabena Flight 503: Douglas DC-6 of the Belgian airline company Sabena crashed into Monte Terminillo near Rieti, Italy, killing all 29 people on board.
- Died: Marcella Mariani, 19, Italian actress and model, passenger of Sabena Flight 503

== February 14, 1955 (Monday) ==
- The West German cargo ship Hoheweg collided with Sunny Prince and sank in the English Channel off Dungeness, Kent. All fifteen crew were rescued by Sunny Prince and landed at Dover.

== February 16, 1955 (Wednesday) ==
- Nearly 100 people died in a fire at a home for the elderly in Yokohama, Japan.

== February 17, 1955 (Thursday) ==
- Died: Pete Jarman, 62, member of the United States House of Representatives from Alabama and U.S. Ambassador to Australia, died after suffering a heart attack on February 14.

== February 18, 1955 (Friday) ==
- The Cambodian Red Cross was established.

== February 19, 1955 (Saturday) ==
- The Southeast Asia Treaty Organization was established at a meeting in Bangkok.
- Born: Jeff Daniels, American actor, in Athens, Georgia

== February 20, 1955 (Sunday) ==
- Died: Oswald Avery, 77, US physician and medical researcher

== February 21, 1955 (Monday) ==
- Born: Kelsey Grammer, American actor and producer, in St. Thomas, U.S. Virgin Islands

== February 22, 1955 (Tuesday) ==
- In Chicago's Democratic primary, Mayor Martin H. Kennelly lost to the head of the Cook County Democratic Party, Richard J. Daley, by 364,839 votes to 264,077.

== February 23, 1955 (Wednesday) ==
- Died: Paul Claudel, 86, French poet, dramatist, and diplomat

== February 24, 1955 (Thursday) ==
- Born:
  - Steve Jobs, US businessman and founder of Apple Inc., in San Francisco, California (d. 2011)
  - Woo Bum-kon, South Korean policeman and spree killer, in Pusan, South Gyeongsang (d. 1982)

== February 25, 1955 (Friday) ==
- Pope Pius XII created the Roman Catholic Diocese of Penang and the Roman Catholic Diocese of Kuala Lumpur.
- New Zealand philanthropist Edith Winstone Blackwell was awarded the MBE by Governor General Sir Willoughby Norrie.

== February 26, 1955 (Saturday) ==
- George F. Smith became the first person to survive a supersonic ejection, from a North American F-100 Super Sabre travelling at Mach 1.05.

== February 27, 1955 (Sunday) ==
- Died: Trixie Friganza, 84, US actress

== February 28, 1955 (Monday) ==
- The Maltese general election ended in another victory for the Malta Labour Party, which won 23 of the 40 seats.
- Operation Black Arrow, an Israeli attack on the Egyptian Controlled Gaza Strip, left 38 Egyptian and 8 Israeli soldiers dead and would lead to United Nations Security Council Resolution 106.
- Born: Gilbert Gottfried, American stand-up comedian and actor, in Brooklyn, New York (d. 2022)
- Died: Isak Penttala, 72, Finnish politician
