= Pasha Bulker =

Bulk carrier (ship)

Coordinates: 32.9236°S 151.7978°E

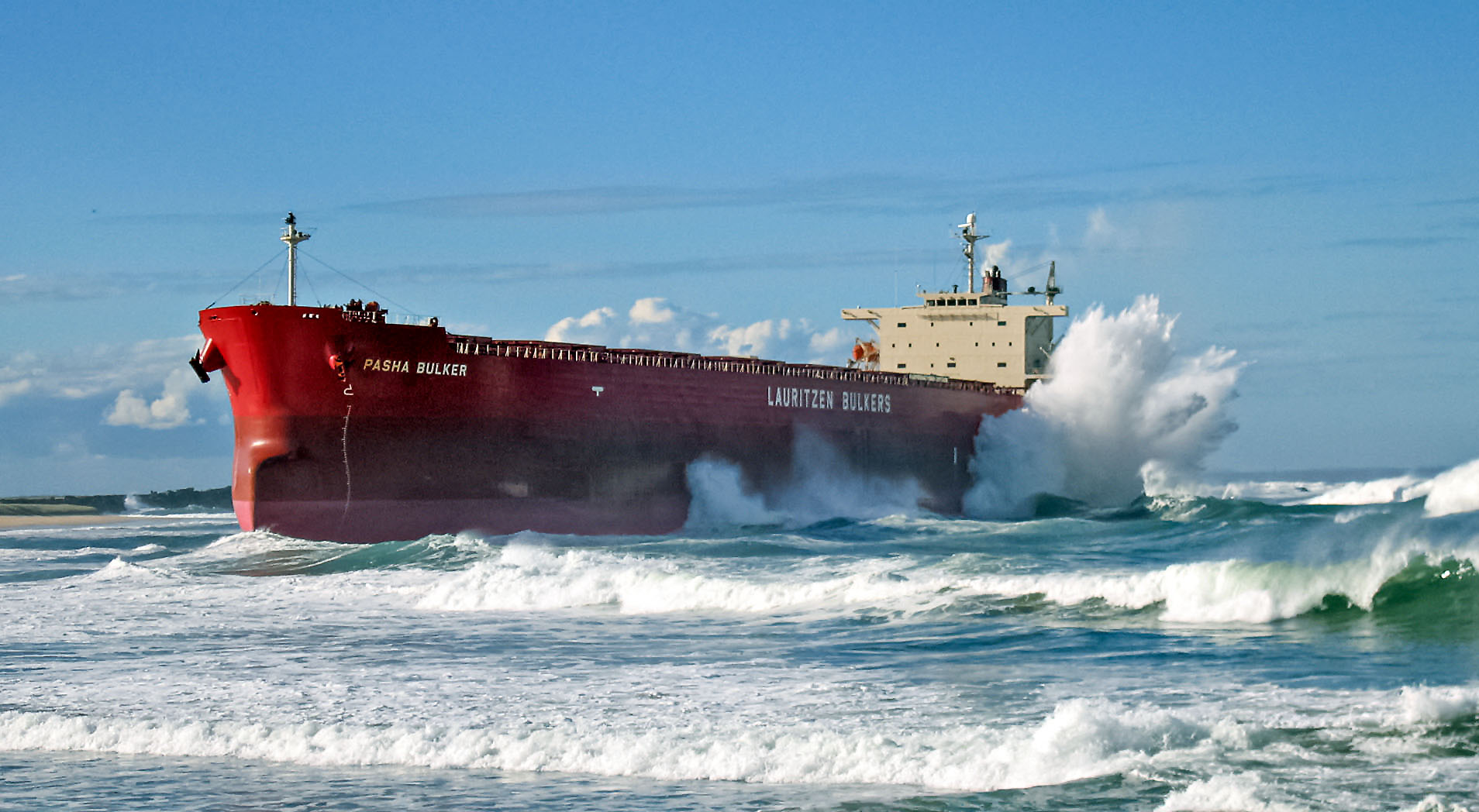
- Pasha Bulker on Nobbys Beach, Newcastle

History

Marshall Islands
- Name: Pasha Bulker (2006–08); Drake (2008–2018); Anthea (2018–present)
- Port of registry: Marshall Islands previously Panama
- Builder: Sasebo Heavy Industries, Japan
- Laid down: 2006
- Launched: 6 June 2006
- Identification: MMSI number: 538007898; IMO number: 9317729; Call sign: 3EQK8
- Status: In service

General characteristics
- Tonnage: 40,042 GT; 76,781 DWT
- Length: 225 m (738 ft)
- Beam: 32.2 m (105.6 ft)
- Speed: 14.5 knots (26.9 km/h; 16.7 mph)
- Capacity: 90,911 m^{3} (3,210,492 cu ft)
- Crew: 22

Anthea, formerly the Drake and Pasha Bulker, is a Panamax bulk carrier of 76,741 tonnes deadweight (DWT) operated by the Lauritzen Bulkers shipping company and owned by Japanese Disponent Owners. While waiting in the open ocean outside Newcastle harbour to load coal, Pasha Bulker ran aground during a major storm on 8 June 2007 on Nobbys Beach, New South Wales, Australia. It was refloated and moved to a safe location offshore on 2 July 2007 before being towed to Japan for major repairs on 26 July 2007.

Pasha Bulker was built in 2006 by Sasebo Heavy Industries, and sails (as the Anthea) under the flag of the Marshall Islands as a flag of convenience. It is 225 m (738 ft) in length with a beam of 32.2 m (105.6 ft) and a cargo hold capacity (grain) of 90,911 cubic metres (3,210,492 cu ft).

== Storm and beaching ==
Early on the morning of 8 June 2007, Newcastle Port Corporation radioed the 56 moored ships waiting off the coast to load coal to warn them to move out to sea to escape an approaching storm. Pasha Bulker, along with 10 other ships, did not heed the warning. As the storm hit, Pasha Bulker could not clear the coast and it beached at 9:51 a.m. The ship never called for tug assistance, ran aground with a fully operational engine room and still had both anchors stored in the hawsepipes, leading some maritime experts to believe that proper precautions were not taken by the ship's captain.

After Pasha Bulker ran aground the 22 Filipino and Korean crew members aboard were successfully rescued by the Westpac Rescue helicopter service from the vessel, which grounded about 30 metres (98 ft) from shore at the popular Nobbys Beach. The ship was empty of cargo at the time, waiting to load 58,000 tonnes of coal from Newcastle Port. However, it contained around 700 tonnes of fuel oil, 38 tonnes of diesel and 40 tonnes of lube oil, which if released could have caused an ecological problem.

During further stormy weather, the ship was pushed onto the beach so that it was almost parallel to the beach, and both bow and stern were stuck on the sand. The whole ship was then completely trapped between the beach and a rocky reef. In the first week the salvage crew loaded the ship with ballast water, which sank it lower, so that its hull was firmly on the seabed.

Its location on a popular beach and close proximity to the Newcastle CBD made Pasha Bulker a tourist destination and precipitated a minor economic boom. One radio station promoted a song called "Blame it on the Pasha Bulker", a rewrite of the song, "Blame It on the Bossa Nova". Pasha Bulker was even advertised on eBay for a short time, with bids reaching $16 million before eBay closed the auction.

While beached, Pasha Bulker was used as a billboard for slogans by Greenpeace on 27 June 2007. Lasers beamed messages such as "Coal causes climate change chaos" and "This is what climate change looks like" in red on the side of the ship. Greenpeace stated that the protest was motivated by unnamed "scientists tell[ing] us that storm surges of the type that we saw earlier this month are something that we can expect more of as a result of climate change."

== Salvage operation ==
=== Planning ===
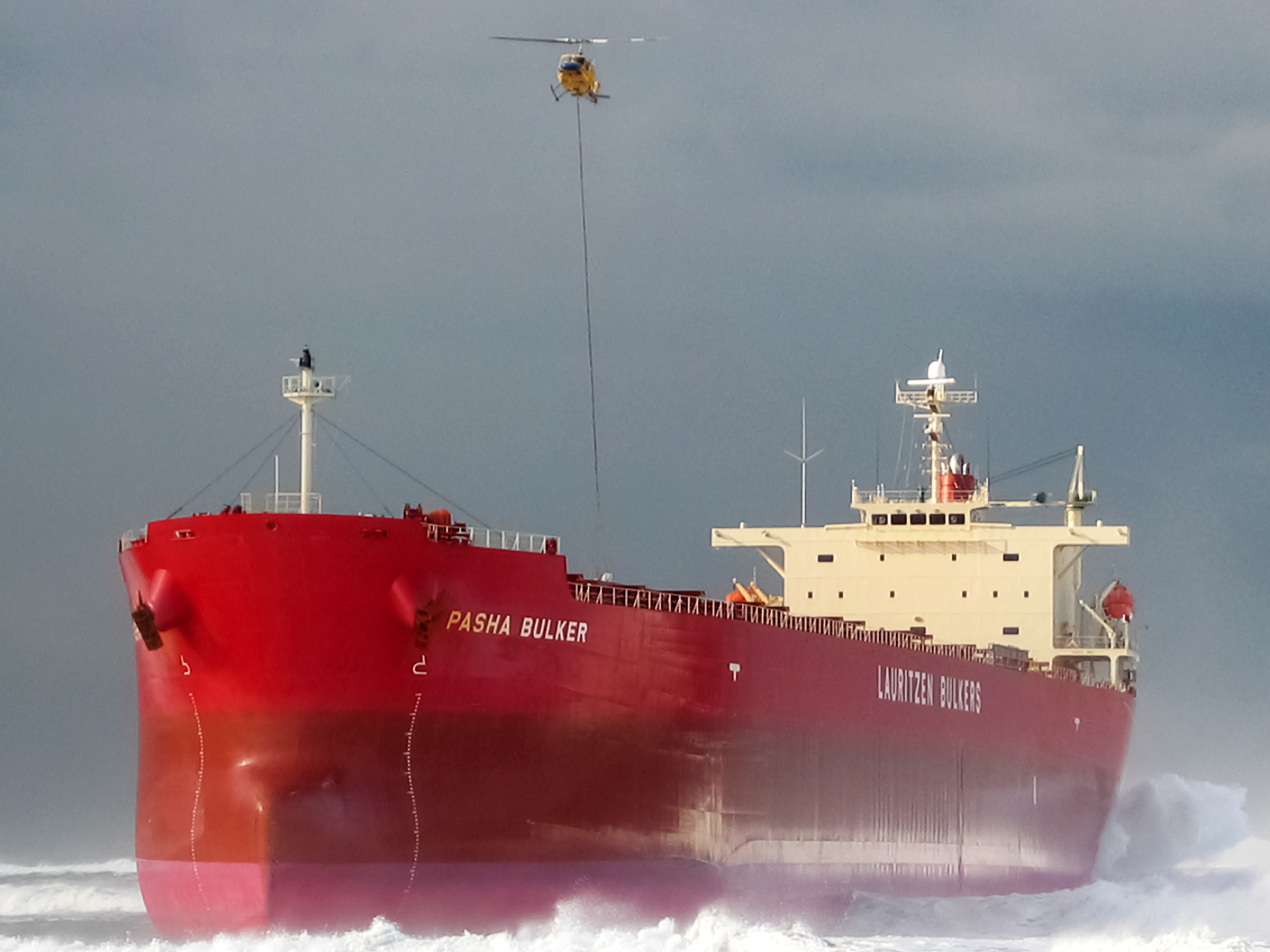
A helicopter operating above the beached ship

Svitzer, a Danish company, was awarded the contract to salvage the bulk carrier.

On 9 June 2007 a salvage team, led by Drew Shannon, boarded the ship to assess the condition of the hull. Salvage investigators confirmed on 11 June 2007 that the outer shell of the ship's double hull had been breached and was taking on water on the starboard side.

It was decided that the refloating attempt would proceed despite concerns that the ship was too badly damaged to be refloated. Any attempt at moving the ship was to occur at high tide, when the ship's own buoyancy would reduce the towing force required and the chance of it breaking into two. The salvage attempt was not to involve removing any of the fuel or oil off the vessel.

The plan to salvage Pasha Bulker used anchors laid out at sea, which the ship was to use to then winch itself seawards, and three tug boats towing it with the aim of dragging the bow over a rock reef. The carrier would then be pulled seaward in a path between two rocky reefs. A hydrographic survey was conducted to survey and map the bottom of the ocean through the surf zone using a surf ski single beam echo sounder and GPS. This gave the salvage team more insight into the direction for refloating the ship.

An emergency response team was to remain on standby should the vessel begin leaking fuel and an exclusion zone was set up around the location of the ship with marker buoys to stop all ships and surfers from entering the area. In addition on 25 June 2007 an air exclusion zone was created around the ship. Various attempts for refloating the ship were suggested. University of Sydney Honorary Associate Professor Rob Wheen suggested liquefying the sand under the ship by pumping seawater into it. This liquefaction should reduce the friction between grains of sand and in turn, friction between the ship and sand. Whether this would have been effective in this case is unknown as Pasha Bulker was lying on rock as well as sand and the ship would have had to be pulled up and over the rocks.

=== First attempt ===
Final preparations to refloat the ship began on 28 June 2007 when the ballast water, added earlier to stabilise the vessel, was pumped out to aid buoyancy. At around 5:30 p.m. AEST the tug boats began pulling on the lines attached to the bow on the port side and the ship appeared to move for the first time. An ocean swell up to 4 m (13 ft) pounded the ship and caused the bow to move back and forth even when tethered to the tug boats. Soon after the attempt started to shift the ship, one of the cables connecting the ship to the tug boat Keera snapped dashing the attempt. This resulted in the decision to make another attempt after the salvage crews could regroup.

Salvage efforts on the morning of 29 June 2007 were hampered by more cables snapping, this time it was cables attached to the supertug Pacific Responder and a sea anchor. Ballast water was reloaded to help preserve the initial gains that were made and the next attempt to move the ship was deferred to the evening of 1 July 2007 to allow salvage engineers more time to secure new cables to the tugs and between the winches and sea anchors.

=== Second attempt ===
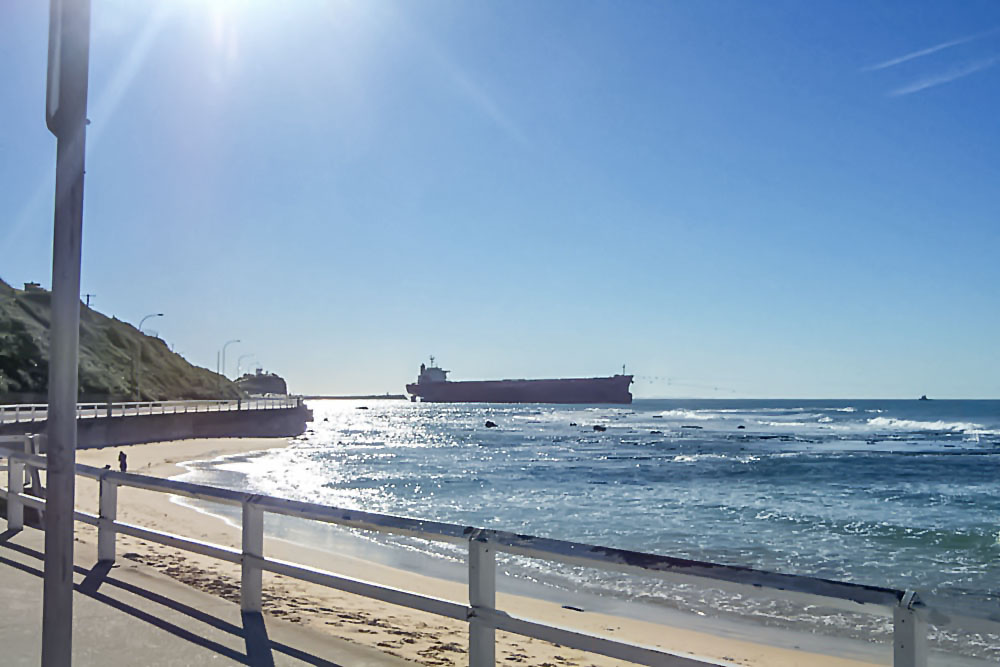
Position of Pasha Bulker on the morning after the second refloat attempt

Three salvage tugs managed to rotate Pasha Bulker so that it was now facing deep water and was only a few degrees short of being able to clear the reef. At its new position, it was only 50 m (164 ft) from water deep enough to refloat the vessel and get it away. However, two separate oil slicks were detected in the vicinity of Pasha Bulker, prompting concerns about a potential oil spill. The oil spill ship Shirley Smith was dispatched to assess the threat of an oil leak while the salvage operations were suspended. It was later determined that the liquid was simply lubricating oil expelled from the suspended propeller and snapped rudder; it was washed into the ocean with westerly winds.

=== Third attempt and successful reflotation ===
The ship was successfully towed off the reef on the third attempt at approximately 9:37 p.m. AEST on 2 July 2007. By 9:41 p.m. it was 500 metres (1,640 ft) offshore. It was then held 11 nautical miles (20 km) from the Newcastle shoreline and inspected by divers for oil spills and to determine the extent of the hull damage.

=== Damage assessment and repairs ===
In addition to large creases that were visible on both sides of the outer hull while the ship was beached, propeller and rudder damage became evident during the operation to remove the ship from the beach. Assessment by divers while the ship was being held offshore determined that one of the ballast tanks was flooded. Minor repairs to Pasha Bulker were conducted in Newcastle harbour before the ship was towed by the Japanese supertug Koyo Maru for major repairs in Japan.

== Post-reflotation events ==
=== Repairs and responsibilities ===
After the ship was refloated, questions as to who would pay for the recovery of the ship were raised. On 4 July 2007 it was announced that the Japanese owners had promised to pay for the total cost of the salvage in accordance with international conventions. The ship was towed into Newcastle harbour where minor repairs were carried out while a decision on where major repairs would be completed was made.

The Government of New South Wales did not press charges against the master because negligence could not be proved "beyond reasonable doubt". A NSW Maritime report found horrendous weather conditions combined with poor seamanship by the master of the vessel were to blame. At the height of the incident the ship's master had left the bridge to have breakfast. The report said the master failed to realise the impact of the forecast weather in the anchorage even though wind warnings were received as early as 3 June 2007. The master also did not ballast the ship for heavy weather.

=== Departure ===
Pasha Bulker left the port of Newcastle on 26 July 2007. Four kilometres out to sea the Japanese salvage tug Koyo Maru connected lines to Pasha Bulker to tow it back to Japan. Metal beams could be seen reinforcing the buckled hull, as these were part of the temporary repair solution affixed at Newcastle.

=== Safety investigation ===
The Australian Transport Safety Bureau released a report into the grounding, which includes analysis of port capacity controls, bridge audio recordings, radar tracks, ship's logs, weather and other ship movements at the time. It identifies several safety issues.

=== Subsequent career ===
In 2008, Pasha Bulker was renamed Drake, repaired and returned to service. In 2018, the ship was renamed again to Anthea.

== Historic comparison ==
Nobby's Breakwall was originally built in the first half of the 19th century to protect ships entering Newcastle harbour. After the breakwater was completed Nobbys Beach formed against it and over the reefs around Nobby's headland. It is on these reefs where Pasha Bulker came to grief.

However, it is not the first ship to run aground in the area. In 1940 the TSS Maianbar, a 493-ton steamship, broke its towline while en route to Sydney and drifted ashore near where Pasha Bulker was beached. It could not be refloated and was dismantled on-site. Pasha Bulker beaching has also drawn parallels to the 1974 beaching of MV Sygna on Stockton beach, some 8 km (5 mi) further north, and Cherry Venture, which was beached during a storm in 1973 on Teewah Beach in Queensland.
