= Cleft Island =

Cleft Island may refer to:

- Cleft Island (Antarctica)
- Cleft Island (Victoria)
