= October 1954 =

Month of 1954

<<	October 1954					>>
Su	Mo	Tu	We	Th	Fr	Sa
					1	2
3	4	5	6	7	8	9
10	11	12	13	14	15	16
17	18	19	20	21	22	23
24	25	26	27	28	29	30
31

The following events occurred in October 1954:

== October 1, 1954 (Friday) ==
- The British colony of Nigeria became the autonomous Federation of Nigeria.
- China Construction Bank was founded in Beijing, China.

== October 2, 1954 (Saturday) ==
- The New York Giants won the 1954 World Series baseball competition, sweeping the heavily favored Cleveland Indians in 4 games.

== October 3, 1954 (Sunday) ==
- KFVS TV channel 12 in Cape Girardeau, MO (CBS) begins broadcasting.
- Born:
  - Dennis Eckersley, American baseball player, in Oakland, California
  - Stevie Ray Vaughan, American musician, in Dallas (d. 1990, helicopter crash)

== October 4, 1954 (Monday) ==
- The Dutch cutter Jonge Jochem sailed from Den Helder and was never heard from again.

== October 5, 1954 (Tuesday) ==
- Hurricane Hazel forms in the Caribbean, killing 400-1000 people.

== October 6, 1954 (Wednesday) ==
- Primate of Poland Stefan Wyszyński, imprisoned by the communist government, was relocated from Stoczek Klasztorny to Prudnik.

== October 7, 1954 (Thursday) ==
- The Danish cargo ship Rikke Skou sank off Terschelling, Netherlands, with the loss of twelve of her twenty crew.
- The British cargo ship La Pampa and the coaster Seahorse both ran aground in the Scheldt, Belgium.
- The US ore carrier Mormackite capsized and sank off the coast of Virginia with the loss of 37 of her 48 crew.

== October 9, 1954 (Saturday) ==
- A boiler explosion and fire occurred aboard the Norwegian cargo ship Emma Bakke in the Atlantic Ocean. The crew abandoned ship and were rescued by the Argentine ship Corrientes and taken to Lisbon, Portugal. Two crew were killed in the explosion and the ship sank.
- Another Norwegian cargo ship, Jane Stove, suffered a fracture to her main deck whilst in the North Sea, but eventually reached the Faroe Islands on 10 October.
- KTIV TV channel 4 in Sioux City, IA (NBC) begins broadcasting.
- Died: Robert H. Jackson, 62, United States Supreme Court associate justice and chief prosecutor at the Nuremberg trials, died of a myocardial infarction.

== October 10, 1954 (Sunday) ==
- In the Guatemalan general election, 99.92% of voters voted in favour of the presidency of Carlos Castillo Armas, whilst the National Anti-Communist Front won 57 of the 65 seats in the Assembly.
- In the 1st National Film Awards: "Shyamchi Aai" wins the Golden Lotus.
- Born: David Lee Roth, American hard rock singer, in Bloomington, Indiana

== October 11, 1954 (Monday) ==
- Pre-Vietnam War: The civil administration of North Vietnam was transferred to the Việt Minh, and Hồ Chí Minh was appointed Prime Minister of North Vietnam.
- Hurricane Hazel crossed Haiti, destroying villages and causing considerable damage to major cities. An estimated 1,000 people were killed. Hazel also destroyed about 40% of the coffee trees and 50% of the cacao crop, affecting the country's economy for several years.

== October 12, 1954 (Tuesday) ==
- South Africa's Prime Minister, D. F. Malan, announced his retirement, to a "dumbfounded" cabinet.
- Died: George Welch, 36, US test pilot and World War II flying ace, killed in the crash of a North American F-100A Super Sabre during a test flight; the incident resulted in the grounding of all F-100A aircraft.

== October 14, 1954 (Thursday) ==
- The first American four-stage rocket was launched by the Pilotless Aircraft Research Division of NACA's Langley Laboratory at Wallops Island.

== October 15, 1954 (Friday) ==
- Hurricane Hazel made U.S. landfall; it is the only recorded Category 4 hurricane to strike as far north as North Carolina.

== October 16, 1954 (Saturday) ==
- Elvis Presley made his first radio broadcast, on a show in Shreveport, Louisiana, called Louisiana Hayride.

== October 18, 1954 (Monday) ==
- Texas Instruments announced the development of the first commercial transistor radio. The Regency TR-1 would go on sale the following month.
- The comic strip Hi and Lois, by Mort Walker and Dik Browne, was launched.
- In the UK government, Selwyn Lloyd succeeded Duncan Sandys as Minister of Supply. Sandys became Minister of Housing.

== October 19, 1954 (Tuesday) ==
- The English region of Exmoor became a National Park.
- Born: Agnes M. Sigurðardóttir, Iceland's first woman bishop, in Ísafjörður

== October 20, 1954 (Wednesday) ==
- A dock workers' strike in the United Kingdom began to escalate.
- Born: Yati Octavia, Indonesian actress

== October 22, 1954 (Friday) ==
- Died: Jibanananda Das, 55, Indian poet, writer, novelist and essayist in Bengali, of injuries sustained when hit by a tram near Calcutta's Deshapriya Park on 14 October.

== October 23, 1954 (Saturday) ==
- West Germany joined NATO.
- The Paris Agreement set up the Western European Union to implement the Treaty of Brussels (1948), providing for mutual self-defence and other collaboration between Belgium, France, West Germany, Italy, Luxembourg, the Netherlands and the United Kingdom.

== October 24, 1954 (Sunday) ==
- A U.S. Air Force Douglas C-47A-90-DL Skytrain (registration 43–16044) strayed off course during a flight from Rome Ciampino Airport in Rome, Italy, to Lyon-Bron Airport in Lyon, France, and crashed into a mountainside in the Maritime Alps west of Limone Piemonte, Italy, at an altitude of 8,500 feet (2,600 meters), killing all 21 people on board.
- The Spanish Grand Prix was held at Pedralbes and won by British driver Mike Hawthorn. It would be the last held in Spain until 1967.
- Hungarian footballer Sándor Kocsis scored his sixth international hat trick in a match against Czechoslovakia.
- Born: Malcolm Turnbull, Australian politician, 29th Prime Minister of Australia

== October 25, 1954 (Monday) ==
- Landslides caused by heavy rains hit Salerno, Italy, killing about 300.

== October 26, 1954 (Tuesday) ==
- Egyptian leader Gamal Abdel Nasser is targeted in an assassination attempt by Muslim Brotherhood member Mahmoud Abdul Latif.
- Born: D.W. Moffett, American actor, in Chicago

== October 27, 1954 (Wednesday) ==
- The movie Godzilla first premiered in Japan.

== October 28, 1954 (Thursday) ==
- In Philadelphia, an explosion at a laboratory killed or mortally injured 12 people.
- Died: Wu Chuanyu, 26, Chinese Olympic swimmer, killed when Aeroflot Flight 136, an Ilyushin Il-12 (registration CCCP-L1789) on a domestic flight in the Soviet Union from Irkutsk Airport in Irkutsk to Krasnoyarsk Airport in Krasnoyarsk, flew into the side of Mount Sivukha, killing all 19 people on board.

== October 29, 1954 (Friday) ==
- Born: Lee Child (real name Jim Grant), English thriller writer, in Coventry

== October 30, 1954 (Saturday) ==
- A United States Navy Lockheed R7V-1 Constellation vanished over the North Atlantic Ocean 350 miles (560 km) off the coast of Maryland during a flight from Naval Air Station Patuxent River, Maryland, to Lajes Field in the Azores. The search for the missing aircraft would end on November 4 because of extreme weather conditions, and no sign of the plane or the 42 people on board was ever found.
- Died: Wilbur Shaw, 51, US racing driver, in an air crash at Decatur, Indiana; pilot Ray Grimes and artist Ernest Roose were also killed.

== October 31, 1954 (Sunday) ==
- Algerian War of Independence: The Algerian National Liberation Front began a revolt against French rule.
- The 1954 LPGA Golf Tour concluded.
