= August 1954 =

Month of 1954

<<	August 1954					>>
Su	Mo	Tu	We	Th	Fr	Sa
1	2	3	4	5	6	7
8	9	10	11	12	13	14
15	16	17	18	19	20	21
22	23	24	25	26	27	28
29	30	31

The following events occurred in August 1954:

== August 1, 1954 (Sunday) ==
- The First Indochina War ends with the Vietnam People's Army in North Vietnam, the Vietnamese National Army in South Vietnam, the Kingdom of Cambodia in Cambodia, and the Kingdom of Laos in Laos, emerging victorious against the French Army.

== August 2, 1954 (Monday) ==
- The 1954 II Cornwall MRC Formula 1 Race is held at the Davidstow Circuit, Cornwall, UK, and is won by John Coombs in a Lotus Mk VIII.

== August 3, 1954 (Tuesday) ==
- Died: Colette, 81, French novelist

== August 4, 1954 (Wednesday) ==
- In the United Kingdom, the Independent Television Authority officially begins operations.

== August 5, 1954 (Thursday) ==
- Born: Richard Preston, writer and journalist, in Cambridge, Massachusetts, USA.

== August 6, 1954 (Friday) ==
- The West German airline Luftag acquires the name and logo of the defunct airline Deutsche Luft Hansa. Renamed Lufthansa, it will begin flight operations in April 1955.
- Died: Emilie Dionne, 20, one of the Dionne quintuplets, of asphyxiation following an epileptic seizure. She is the first of the five to perish, and three of them survive into the 21st century.

== August 7, 1954 (Saturday) ==
- The last streetcars operate on the Altoona and Logan Valley Electric Railway in Altoona, Pennsylvania, USA.
- The Air Force School of Aviation Medicine at Randolph Field, Texas, receives the first specifically built space cabin simulator.

== August 8, 1954 (Sunday) ==
- British cargo ship Spanker runs aground at Hook of Holland, Netherlands and is holed.

== August 9, 1954 (Monday) ==
- Three minutes after takeoff from Lajes Field on Terceira Island in the Azores, for a flight to Bermuda, an Avianca Lockheed L-749A-79 Constellation (registration HK-163) crashes into high ground near Monte de Boi at an altitude of 620 meters (2,034 feet), killing all 30 people on board. It is the second-deadliest aviation accident in Portugal's history at the time.

== August 10, 1954 (Tuesday) ==
- First use of the 24-second shot-clock in competitive basketball.

== August 11, 1954 (Wednesday) ==
- Indian annexation of Dadra and Nagar Haveli: Portuguese forces surrender to the Indian SRP.

== August 12, 1954 (Thursday) ==
- Born: Francois Hollande, 24th President of the French Republic; Leung Chun-ying, Chinese politician

== August 14, 1954 (Saturday) ==
- Born: Mark Fidrych, American baseball player, in Worcester, Massachusetts, USA. (d. 2009)
- Died: Hugo Eckener, President of the Zeppelin Dirigible Company (b. 1868)

== August 16, 1954 (Monday) ==
- An Air Vietnam Bristol Type 170 Freighter on a domestic flight in Vietnam from Hanoi to Saigon carrying refugees from the Red River delta suffers engine trouble and attempts to divert to an emergency landing at Pakse, Laos. While on approach to Pakse, it crashes into a tributary of the Mekong River, killing 47 of the 55 people on board. It is the deadliest aviation accident in the history of newly independent Laos at the time and will be the deadliest in history involving a Bristol Freighter.
- The first issue of Sports Illustrated magazine is published in the United States.
- Born: James Cameron, Canadian film director, in Kapuskasing, Ontario.

== August 17, 1954 (Tuesday) ==
- Died: Billy Murray, singer, dies of a heart attack aged 77

== August 19, 1954 (Thursday) ==
- British tug Applegarth sinks at Canning Dock, Liverpool, UK.

== August 22, 1954 (Sunday) ==
- A Braniff Airways Douglas C-47-DL Skytrain (registration N61451) on a flight from Waterloo, Iowa, to Mason City, Iowa, crashes after entering a thunderstorm near Mason City, killing 12 of the 19 people aboard.
- The 1954 All-Ireland Senior Camogie Championship is won by Dublin.

== August 23, 1954 (Monday) ==
- A KLM Douglas DC-6B (registration PH-DFO) on a flight from Shannon Airport in Shannon, Ireland, to Schiphol Airport in Amsterdam, the Netherlands, crashes into the North Sea off the Dutch coast, killing all 21 people aboard. The investigation of the accident lasts until November 1955, when it concludes without establishing a cause for the crash.
- A United States Air Force Lockheed C-130 Hercules flew its first flight at Burbank, California manufactured by Lockheed Martin

== August 24, 1954 (Tuesday) ==
- Died: Getúlio Vargas, 72, Brazilian president; Vargas commits suicide after being accused of involvement in a conspiracy to murder his chief political opponent, Carlos Lacerda, shooting himself in the chest at the Catete Palace with a Colt Police Positive Special.

== August 25, 1954 (Wednesday) ==
- The 1954 European Championships in Athletics open at Berne, capital of Switzerland.
- Born: Elvis Costello, English singer, songwriter, and musician, in London
- Died: U.S. Air Force Captain Joseph C. McConnell, 32, the top-scoring American jet ace in history, in the crash of an F-86H Sabre fighter-bomber when its controls malfunction during a test flight at Edwards Air Force Base, California.

== August 28, 1954 (Saturday) ==
- Belgian cargo ship Prince de Liege runs aground in the Niger Delta, Nigeria. It is refloated on 13 October with assistance from the Dutch tug Poolzee.

== August 29, 1954 (Sunday) ==
- The Filipino cargo ship Donalourdes, the British cargo ship Thorncombe, and the Panama-registered cargo ship Northern Princess are driven ashore at Kowloon, Hong Kong, in a typhoon.
- The British ore carrier Orelia runs aground at Port Talbot, Glamorgan. It was later refloated.
- Born: István Cserháti, Hungarian keyboardist (d. 2005)

== August 30, 1954 (Monday) ==
- Born: Alexander Lukashenko, President of Belarus since 1994; in Kopys, Belarus (Soviet Union)

== August 31, 1954 (Tuesday) ==
- Born: Claudell Washington, American baseball player, in Los Angeles (d. 2020)
- Died: Elsa Barker, American writer (b. 1869)
