= January 1955 =

Month of 1955

<<	January 1955					>>
Su	Mo	Tu	We	Th	Fr	Sa
						1
2	3	4	5	6	7	8
9	10	11	12	13	14	15
16	17	18	19	20	21	22
23	24	25	26	27	28	29
30	31

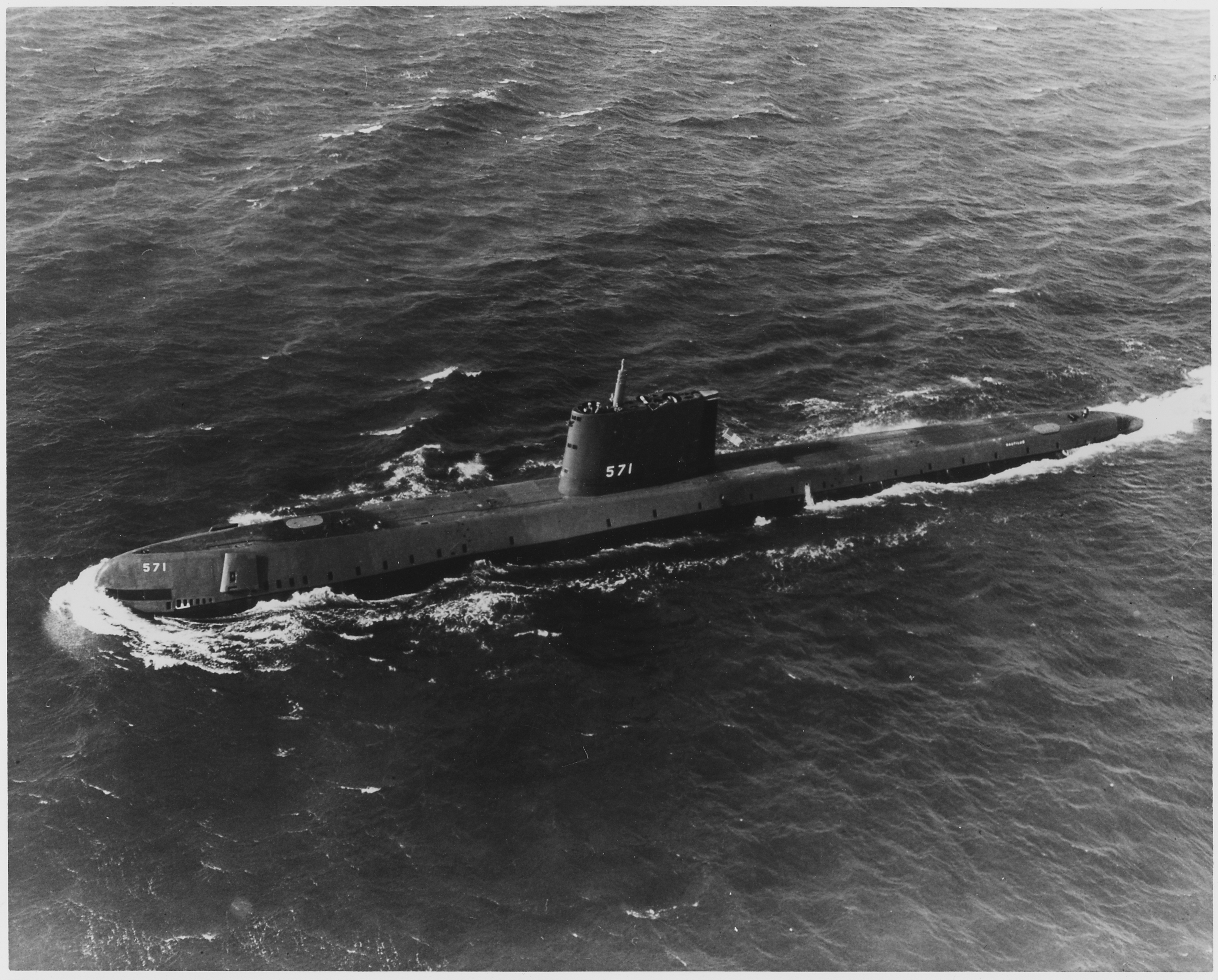
January 17, 1955: USS Nautilus, the first atomic-powered submarine, first takes to sea.

The following events occurred in January 1955:

== January 1, 1955 (Saturday) ==
- The United Kingdom's first atomic bomber unit, the Royal Air Force's No. 138 Squadron, is formed, flying Vickers Valiants from RAF Gaydon.
- The 1955 Cotton Bowl Classic American football game is won by the Georgia Tech Yellow Jackets.
- Born: Mary Beard, academic and TV presenter, in Much Wenlock
- Died: Shanti Swaroop Bhatnagar, 60, Indian scientist (heart attack)

== January 2, 1955 (Sunday) ==
- The Swedish cargo ship Rosafred runs aground off Stockholm. All 22 crew are rescued by another Swedish ship, K A Wallenberg.
- Died: José Antonio Remón Cantera, 46, president of Panama, assassinated by shooting by unknown assailants at a race track in Panama City, along with one of his bodyguards

== January 3, 1955 (Monday) ==
- José Ramón Guizado, Vice President of Panama, takes over as President of Panama following the death of his predecessor.

== January 4, 1955 (Tuesday) ==
- Holy Cross Church, Gilling, the parish church of Gilling East in North Yorkshire, England, is designated as a Grade I listed building.

== January 5, 1955 (Wednesday) ==
- Born: Mamata Banerjee, Indian politician, Chief Minister of West Bengal, in Kolkata
- Died:
  - Hans-Karl Freiherr von Esebeck, 62, German general and anti-Hitler conspirator
  - Marcel Déat, 60, French far-right politician. He was hidden in a convent in Turin to escape a death sentence for collaborationism; his death is made public after two months.

== January 6, 1955 (Thursday) ==
- The Irish Farmers Association is formed during a meeting of 1,200 people in Dublin.
- Born: Rowan Atkinson, English comedian and actor, in Consett
- Died: Yevgeny Tarle, 80, Soviet historian

== January 7, 1955 (Friday) ==
- Marian Anderson becomes the first African-American to perform with the Metropolitan Opera in New York, when she sings the role of Ulrica in Giuseppe Verdi's Un ballo in maschera (opposite Zinka Milanov, then Herva Nelli, as Amelia) at the invitation of director Rudolf Bing.
- In Canada, the opening of parliament is broadcast on television for the first time.
- U.K. release of the Halas and Batchelor film animation of George Orwell's Animal Farm (completed April 1954), the first full-length British-made animated feature on general theatrical release.

== January 8, 1955 (Saturday) ==
- Yugoslav leader Josip Broz Tito returns from a visit to India. He would subsequently lift many restrictions on churches and spiritual institutions in Yugoslavia.
- Malayan Emergency: Sabak Bernam is declared as a white area (free from the communist insurgency).
- A penumbral lunar eclipse takes place.
- The 1955 Five Nations Championship rugby tournament opens with victory for France over Scotland in Paris.

== January 9, 1955 (Sunday) ==
- Boris Shilkov breaks the World record in men's 5000 m speed skating, bringing it under 8 minutes for the first time.
- Model Vickie Martin (real name Valerie Mewes) dies following a car crash near Maidenhead in Buckinghamshire.

== January 10, 1955 (Monday) ==
- Aircraft of the People's Republic of China attack the Nationalist Chinese-held Tachen Islands.
- Kailash Nath Katju becomes India's Minister of Defence.
- After an extensive overhaul, the attack aircraft carrier USS Shangri-La (CVA-38) is recommissioned as the first operational United States Navy aircraft carrier with an angled flight deck.

== January 11, 1955 (Tuesday) ==
- Two Royal Air Force No. 42 Squadron Avro Shackleton maritime patrol aircraft disappear without a trace during a routine exercise off Fastnet Rock on the southwest coast of Ireland, and are presumed to have collided in mid-air. An engine from one of the aircraft would finally be found in 1966.
- Died: Rodolfo Graziani, 72, Italian general

== January 12, 1955 (Wednesday) ==
- Just after takeoff from Boone County Airport (later Cincinnati/Northern Kentucky International Airport) in Hebron, Kentucky, USA, a Trans World Airlines Martin 2-0-2A collides in mid-air with a privately owned Douglas DC-3 which has strayed into controlled airspace without clearance. Both aircraft crash, killing all 13 people aboard the TWA plane and both people on the DC-3.
- The Jamaican general election ends in victory for the People's National Party, which wins 18 of the 32 seats. Alexander Bustamante continues as the country's First Minister.

== January 13, 1955 (Thursday) ==
- In the UK's South Norfolk by-election, caused by the expulsion of the serving Conservative Member of Parliament (MP), Peter Baker, John Hill holds the seat for the Conservatives with a majority of only 865 votes (2.9%) over his sole opponent, Labour candidate J.M. Stewart.
- The Norwegian cargo ship Gatt runs aground at Hook of Holland, Netherlands. Its crew of 22 are rescued by a Koninklijke Marine helicopter or a line from the shore.

== January 15, 1955 (Saturday) ==
- British cargo ship Sudbury Hill runs aground off Bermuda but is refloated undamaged.
- Died:
  - Johannes Baader, 79, German artist
  - Yves Tanguy, 55, French surrealist painter, in Woodbury, Connecticut

== January 16, 1955 (Sunday) ==
- The 1955 Argentine Grand Prix is held at Buenos Aires and won by Juan Manuel Fangio.

== January 17, 1955 (Monday) ==
- USS Nautilus, the first nuclear-powered submarine, puts to sea for the first time, from Groton, Connecticut.

== January 18, 1955 (Tuesday) ==
- Battle of Yijiangshan Islands: The Chinese Communist People's Liberation Army seizes the islands from the Republic of China (Taiwan).
- Born: Kevin Costner, US actor, producer and director, in Lynwood, California
- Died: August Duesenberg, 75, German-born American automobile manufacturer

== January 19, 1955 (Wednesday) ==
- Chinese Civil War: British cargo ship Edendale is sunk in an air raid at Swatow, China. All 52 crew survive.

== January 20, 1955 (Thursday) ==
- End of the Battle of Yijiangshan Islands: The Chinese Communist People's Liberation Army seizes the islands from the Republic of China (Taiwan).
- In the UK's Orpington by-election, caused by the death of incumbent Conservative MP Sir Waldron Smithers, Donald Sumner holds the seat for the Conservatives with a majority of 9,656 votes.

== January 21, 1955 (Friday) ==
- In the USA, the Milwaukee Road discontinues the western segment of the Columbian, a Chicago - Tacoma, Washington passenger train.
- Born: Jeff Koons, US artist, in York, Pennsylvania
- Died: Archie Hahn, 74, US athlete

== January 22, 1955 (Saturday) ==
- In the USA, The Pentagon announces a plan to develop intercontinental ballistic missiles (ICBMs) armed with nuclear weapons.

== January 23, 1955 (Sunday) ==
- Sutton Coldfield rail crash: An express passenger train traveling from York to Bristol, England, derails as a result of excessive speed on a sharp curve. The fourth carriage is knocked into the air causing it to drag along the station roof, damaging both the roof and the platforms on either side. Seventeen people, including the train crew, are killed and 25 are injured. Local people prevent a worse accident by warning an oncoming train.
- Born: Paul Dörflinger, German footballer (d. 1982 of colorectal cancer)

== January 24, 1955 (Monday) ==
- The Family of Man, an epic exhibit of 503 photographs from around the world, opens at New York’s Museum of Modern Art. The exhibit, curated by Edward Steichen and celebrating the universal experiences of humanity, will go on to tour the world and be seen by 9 million people.
- British Transport Commission produces a report on Modernisation and Re-Equipment of British Railways which proposes the large-scale replacement of the steam locomotive by diesel and electrification together with major resignalling projects.
- Died: Ira Hayes, 32, Native American U.S. Marine flag raiser on Iwo Jima (hypothermia and alcohol poisoning).

== January 25, 1955 (Tuesday) ==
- The Presidium of the Supreme Soviet of the Soviet Union announces the end of the war between the USSR and Germany, which began during World War II in 1941.

== January 26, 1955 (Wednesday) ==
- Born: Eddie Van Halen, American rock musician, in Nijmegen (d. 2020)

== January 27, 1955 (Thursday) ==
- The government of Cuba approves the Asociación de Guías de Cuba (Girl Guides of Cuba) as being of "public utility".
- In the UK's Edinburgh North by-election, caused by the resignation of Unionist MP, James Clyde, William Rankine Milligan holds the seat for the Unionists with a majority of 3,614.

== January 28, 1955 (Friday) ==
- Formosa Resolution: United States Congress authorizes President Dwight D. Eisenhower to use force to protect Formosa from the People's Republic of China.
- The Royal Lao Air Force and Royal Lao Navy are established.
- Born: Nicolas Sarkozy, President of France 2007-2012, in Paris

== January 29, 1955 (Saturday) ==
- Died: Hans Hedtoft, 51, Prime Minister of Denmark (1947-1950, 1953-1955)

== January 30, 1955 (Sunday) ==
- Beginning of the fifth Cabinet of Josip Broz Tito

== January 31, 1955 (Monday) ==
- Died: John Mott, 89, US YMCA leader, recipient of the Nobel Peace Prize
