= Lichen Island =

East antarctica

- Location within Antarctica

Geography
- Location: Antarctica
- Coordinates: 69°20′S 75°32′E

Administration
- Administered under the Antarctic Treaty System

Demographics
- Population: Uninhabited

Lichen Island is a small island lying 9 kilometres (5 nmi) north of the Bølingen Islands and 5 kilometres (2.5 nmi) north-west of Cleft Island in southern Prydz Bay, Antarctica. It was first visited by an Australian National Antarctic Research Expeditions party led by Phillip Law, on 5 February 1955, and named by him for the rich growth of lichens found there.

== See also ==
- List of Antarctic and subantarctic islands
