= June 1954 =

Month of 1954

<<	June 1954					>>
Su	Mo	Tu	We	Th	Fr	Sa
		1	2	3	4	5
6	7	8	9	10	11	12
13	14	15	16	17	18	19
20	21	22	23	24	25	26
27	28	29	30

The following events occurred in June 1954:

== June 1, 1954 (Tuesday) ==
- Beginning of the Saigon Military Mission, a CIA covert operation with the goal of stabilizing the South Vietnamese government and carrying psychological warfare and paramilitary operations against North Vietnam.
- President Eisenhower signed into law House Resolution 7786, changing Armistice Day into Veterans Day.

== June 2, 1954 (Wednesday) ==
- Following the 1954 Irish general election, the 15th Dáil assembles at Leinster House and John A. Costello is appointed the new Taoiseach.
- Born: Dennis Haysbert, African-American actor, in San Mateo

== June 3, 1954 (Thursday) ==
- A Soviet Air Force Mikoyan-Gurevich MiG-15 attacks a Belgian Douglas DC-3 on a cargo flight from the United Kingdom to Yugoslavia, killing one crew member and injuring others. It is forced to land at Graz Airport in Austria.

== June 4, 1954 (Friday) ==
- The European Women's Basketball Championship opens in Belgrade, Yugoslavia.

== June 5, 1954 (Saturday) ==
- The last episode of Your Show of Shows airs on NBC.
- Born:
  - Haluk Bilginer, Turkish actor, in Izmir, Turkey.

== June 6, 1954 (Sunday) ==
- A statue of Yuriy Dolgorukiy in Moscow, originally conceived in 1947 in recognition of the 800th anniversary of the city's foundation, is unveiled.
- The San Francisco Chief passenger train comes into use on the Atchison, Topeka and Santa Fe Railway between Chicago and San Francisco in the United States.
- Born:
  - Harvey Fierstein, American actor and playwright, in Brooklyn, New York
  - Urve Tiidus, Estonian journalist and politician, in Rapla
  - Władysław Żmuda, Polish footballer and manager, in Lublin

== June 7, 1954 (Monday) ==
- All 4 Iowa class battleships are together in one place for the only time in their history.
- Born: Louise Erdrich, US novelist and poet, in Little Falls, Minnesota
- Died: Alan Turing, 41, British mathematician, cryptanalyst, and pioneer computer scientist (suicide)

== June 8, 1954 (Tuesday) ==
- Born:
  - Greg Ginn, US punk rock guitarist, singer, and songwriter (Black Flag), in Tucson, Arizona
  - Kiril of Varna, Bulgarian metropolitan bishop (d. 2013)
  - Sergei Storchak, Deputy Finance Minister of Russia, in Olevsk

== June 9, 1954 (Wednesday) ==
- McCarthyism: Joseph Welch, special counsel for the United States Army, lashes out at Senator Joseph McCarthy, during hearings on whether Communism has infiltrated the Army, saying, "Have you no sense of decency?"
- Parliamentary elections are held in Iraq; the Constitutional Union Party remains the largest party in the Chamber of Deputies of Iraq.
- Born: George Pérez, American comic book artist, in The Bronx, New York (d. 2022)
- Died: Alain LeRoy Locke, 68, US writer, philosopher and educator

== June 10, 1954 (Thursday) ==
- The College World Series men's baseball tournament opens in Omaha, Nebraska, United States.

== June 12, 1954 (Saturday) ==
- An IRA unit carries out a daylight arms raid on the British Army's Gough Barracks in Armagh, Northern Ireland. In twenty minutes, the IRA men loaded a cattle truck with 340 rifles, 50 Sten guns, 12 Bren guns, and a volley of smaller arms and ammunition, and drove it away without anyone being injured.

== June 13, 1954 (Sunday) ==
- The 1954 Giro d'Italia cycle race ends in victory for Swiss rider Carlo Cerci.
- NASCAR holds its first ever road course event, in Linden, New Jersey; it is won by Al Keller in a Jaguar.
- Steam locomotives operate for the last time on the Maine Central Railroad in the United States.

== June 14, 1954 (Monday) ==
- The words "under God" are added to the United States Pledge of Allegiance.

== June 15, 1954 (Tuesday) ==
- The Union of European Football Associations (UEFA) is formed in Basel, Switzerland.
- Born: James Belushi, American actor and comedian; in Chicago, Illinois

== June 16, 1954 (Wednesday) ==
- The 1954 FIFA World Cup opens in Lausanne, Switzerland.

== June 17, 1954 (Thursday) ==
- A CIA-engineered military coup occurs in Guatemala. Democratically elected President of Guatemala Jacobo Árbenz was ousted and the military dictatorship of Carlos Castillo Armas took power.
- Pierre Mendès France is elected prime minister of France, and immediately begins negotiations to end the Indochina war.
- A number of homes are destroyed when a 5.3 magnitude earthquake strikes Anhui Province, China.
- Undisputed Heavyweight Champion Rocky Marciano defeats former champion Ezzard Charles by unanimous decision.

== June 18, 1954 (Friday) ==
- The 4th Berlin International Film Festival opens, running until June 29.

== June 19, 1954 (Saturday) ==
- Ticino, a Swissair Convair CV-240 runs out of fuel and is ditched in the English Channel off Folkestone, Kent, UK. Three of the nine people on board are killed as a result of there being no lifejackets on board and the air crew (who are subsequently dismissed) failing to assist them.
- A Mexican Air Force Douglas C-47 Skytrain crashes into a mountainside near Ixtlahuaca, Mexico, killing all 22 people aboard.
- The US Open golf championship is won by Ed Furgol.
- Born:
  - Lou Pearlman, American music producer and fraudster, in Flushing, New York (died 2016)
  - Kathleen Turner, US actress, in Springfield, Missouri

== June 20, 1954 (Sunday) ==
- The 1954 Copa del Generalísimo, Spain's football cup tournament, is won by Valencia CF for the third time.
- The Belgian Grand Prix is held at Circuit de Spa-Francorchamps and is won by Juan Manuel Fangio.
- Born: Allan Lamb, South African-born England cricketer and sportscaster, in Langebaanweg; Ilan Ramon, Israeli fighter pilot and astronaut, in Ramat Gan (died 2003)

== June 21, 1954 (Monday) ==
- A British Royal Air Force Douglas Dakota C.4 crashes into a hill while attempting a night descent into Eastleigh Airport in Nairobi, Kenya, killing all seven people aboard.
- Born: Anne Kirkbride, British actress (Coronation Street) in Oldham (died 2015); Már Guðmundsson, Icelandic economist, Governor of the Central Bank of Iceland 2009–2019; Robert Menasse, Austrian author and academic, in Vienna
- Died: Gideon Sundback, 74, Swedish engineer, developer of the slide fastener (zipper)

== June 22, 1954 (Tuesday) ==
- Sarah Mae Flemming is expelled from a bus in South Carolina for sitting in a white-only section.
- Died:
  - Honorah Parker, 45, New Zealand housewife, bludgeoned to death by her daughter, 16-year old Pauline Parker, and the 15-year-old Julia Hulme, a future writer of English historical detective fiction as Anne Perry
  - Don Hollenbeck, 49, US newscaster (suicide)

== June 23, 1954 (Wednesday) ==
- An election is held to decide the new leader of the New Zealand Labour Party, as a result of a challenge to the incumbent Walter Nash from Arnold Nordmeyer. Nash won 56.6% of the vote to retain the leadership.

== June 24, 1954 (Thursday) ==
- The Battle of Mang Yang Pass begins in Mang Yang, Vietnam. Lasting for five days, it would become the last battle of the First Indochina War.
- Born: Chang San-cheng, Taiwanese academic and politician, Prime Minister 2016
- Died: Thomas Denman, 3rd Baron Denman, 5th Governor-General of Australia (b. 1874)

== June 25, 1954 (Friday) ==
- In a meeting, Dr. Wernher von Braun, Frederick C. Durant III, Alexander Satin, David Young, Dr. Fred L. Whipple, Dr. S. Fred Singer, and Commander George W. Hoover agree that a Redstone rocket with a Loki cluster as the second stage could launch a satellite into a 200-mile (320 km) orbit without major new developments. Project Orbiter was a later outgrowth of this proposal and resulted in the launching of Explorer I on January 31, 1958.
- Hurricane Alice makes landfall in South Texas, United States, before moving into northern Mexico and causing substantial flooding and other damage in the area of the Pecos River and Rio Grande. Over 50 people are known to have been killed.

== June 26, 1954 (Saturday) ==
- The world's first civilian nuclear power station, Obninsk Nuclear Power Plant, is commissioned in the Soviet Union.

== June 27, 1954 (Sunday) ==
- Lunar Perigee occurs, 3 days before the total solar eclipse.
- Guatemalan President Jacobo Árbenz resigns following a CIA-sponsored military coup d'etat, triggering a bloody civil war that continues for more than 35 years.
- A CIA air attack in support of the military coup napalms a British cargo ship, the Springfjord, and destroys it at Puerto San José, Guatemala.
- A by-election takes place in Guinea for a seat in the National Assembly of France. It is won by Independent candidate Barry Diawadou, despite accusations of fraud against the French administration.
- In the 1954 Taça de Portugal Final, Sporting CP defeat Vitória de Setúbal to win the football tournament for the fifth time.
- Died: Alfredo Versoza, Filipino Roman Catholic bishop and Servant of God (b. 1877)

== June 28, 1954 (Monday) ==
- The US fishing troller Al leaves Sitka, Alaska, bound for Maid Island (56.8347°N 135.4633°W) in Southeast Alaska with one person aboard; the ship is reported missing on 3 July but is never recovered.
- Born: Jean-Serge Brisson, Canadian author and politician, 14th leader of the Libertarian Party of Canada

== June 29, 1954 (Tuesday) ==
- Buckminster Fuller obtains a US patent for his geodesic dome.
- The Battle of Mang Yang Pass (see June 24) ends in victory for the Việt Minh, resulting in the end of the First Indochina War and the final defeat of the French.

== June 30, 1954 (Wednesday) ==
- A solar eclipse is visible in parts of the United States, Canada, Greenland, Iceland, Norway, Sweden, and eastern Europe, thence over Iran, Afghanistan, Pakistan and India, 3 days after perigee.
- Born:
  - Pierre Charles, Dominican educator and politician, 5th Prime Minister of Dominica (d. 2004)
  - Serzh Sargsyan, Armenian politician, 3rd President of Armenia
  - Wayne Swan, Australian academic and politician, 14th Deputy Prime Minister of Australia
- Died:
  - US vocalists R. W. Blackwood, 32, and Bill Lyles, age unknown, of the Blackwood Brothers gospel group and Bill Lyles, age unknown, of the Blackwood Brothers gospel group, killed in an air crash at Clanton, Alabama, while on tour.
  - Andrass Samuelsen, 80, 1st Prime Minister of Faroe Islands
