= September 1954 =

Month of 1954

<<	September 1954					>>
Su	Mo	Tu	We	Th	Fr	Sa
			1	2	3	4
5	6	7	8	9	10	11
12	13	14	15	16	17	18
19	20	21	22	23	24	25
26	27	28	29	30

The following events occurred in September 1954:

== September 1, 1954 (Wednesday) ==
- Died: Bert Acosta, American aviator (b. 1895)

== September 3, 1954 (Friday) ==
- The last 'new' episode of The Lone Ranger radio program is broadcast, after 2,956 episodes over a period of 21 years. Reruns of old episodes continue to be transmitted.
- Died: Eugene Pallette, American actor (b. 1889)

== September 4, 1954 (Saturday) ==
- Soviet war planes shot down a US bomber near or over the coast of Siberia. 9 of the 10 crewmembers would be rescued.
- Dmitri Shostakovich was awarded the International Peace Prize, in Moscow.
- U.S. President Dwight D. Eisenhower signed a bill allowing revocation of the citizenship of anyone advocating violent overthrow of the government.

== September 5, 1954 (Sunday) ==
- A passenger plane Lockheed L-1049 Super Constellation, KLM Flight 633, crashed into River Shannon after takeoff from Shannon, Ireland, killing 28 out of 56 passengers.
- Died: Eugen Schiffer, German politician (b. 1860)

== September 6, 1954 (Monday) ==
- The SEATO treaty is signed in Manila, Philippines.
- Died: Edward C. Kalbfus, American admiral (b. 1877)

== September 7, 1954 (Tuesday) ==
- Died:
  - Bud Fisher, American cartoonist (b. 1885)
  - Glenn Scobey Warner, American college football coach (b. 1871)

== September 8, 1954 (Wednesday) ==
- The Southeast Asia Treaty Organization (SEATO) is established in Bangkok, Thailand.

== September 9, 1954 (Thursday) ==
- Chlef earthquake: an earthquake centered on the city of Orléansville, Algeria kills 1,500 and leaves thousands homeless.

== September 11, 1954 (Saturday) ==
- The Miss America Pageant is broadcast on television for the first time.

== September 14, 1954 (Tuesday) ==
- Totskoye nuclear exercise in Soviet Union.
- English composer Benjamin Britten's chamber opera version of The Turn of the Screw receives its world premiere at the Teatro La Fenice in Venice, Italy.

== September 15, 1954 (Wednesday) ==
- Black Wednesday in air travel: severe delays to flights due to bad weather along the East Coast of the United States.

== September 16, 1954 (Thursday) ==
- Lewis Strauss, chairman of the United States Atomic Energy Commission, in a speech to the National Association of Science Writers claimed: "It is not too much to expect that our children will enjoy in their homes electrical energy too cheap to meter".
- Born: Ashrita Furman, born Keith Furman, American record-breaker

== September 17, 1954 (Friday) ==
- William Golding's novel Lord of the Flies is published in London.
- In their rematch, Rocky Marciano retains his World Heavyweight Champion title with an eighth-round knockout of former champion Ezzard Charles.

== September 18, 1954 (Saturday) ==
- Born: Dennis Johnson, American basketball player (d. 2007)

== September 20, 1954 (Monday) ==
- The Moomin comics, created by Tove Jansson and Lars Jansson, is published internationally in the London newspaper The Evening News.

== September 21, 1954 (Tuesday) ==
- Born: Shinzo Abe, Japanese politician, Prime Minister of Japan, in Shinjuku, Tokyo (d. 2022)
- Died: Mikimoto Kōkichi, Japanese pearl farm pioneer (b. 1858)

== September 22, 1954 (Wednesday) ==
- A riot occurs at Missouri State Penitentiary in Jefferson City. During the incident four inmates are killed and multiple guards are injured. Several parts of the prison are burned by inmates. Burnt areas of the prison from the riot would remain for ten years.

== September 24, 1954 (Friday) ==
- The Cochabamba–Santa Cruz highway connecting western and eastern Bolivia is inaugurated.
- Born: Lilian Mercedes Letona, Salvadoran guerrilla (d. 1983)
- Died: Edward Pilgrim, British homeowner (suicide) (b. 1904)

== September 25, 1954 (Saturday) ==
- Footscray Football Club win their first Australian Football League Grand Final.

== September 26, 1954 (Sunday) ==
- The Japanese ferry Tōya Maru sinks during Typhoon Marie in the Tsugaru Strait. According to Government of Japan official confirmed, killing total 1,505 people, including 1,155 of Tōya Maru. Seven other ships are wrecked and at least nine others seriously damaged.
- A massive heavy city caught fire affected by Typhoon Marie, in Iwanai, Hokkaido, Japan. According to Japanese government official confirmed reported, total 261.4 acres lost to burned, killing 38 people with 551 hurt.

== September 27, 1954 (Monday) ==
- The Tonight Show first aired on live television on NBC in the United States being the first late night talk show.

== September 28, 1954 (Tuesday) ==
- The Belles of St. Trinian's, starring Alastair Sim, is released to British film audiences.
- Died: Bert Lytell, American actor (b. 1885)

== September 29, 1954 (Wednesday) ==
- The CERN Convention finally came into force, when France and Germany deposited their instruments of ratification at UNESCO House in Paris.
- New York Giants outfielder Willie Mays makes a highlight-reel over-the-shoulder catch to lead the Giants to a 5-2 extra inning victory over the Cleveland Indians in Game 1 of the World Series. The play would come to be known as The Catch.
- Born: Masoud Pezeshkian, Iranian reformist politician, President of Iran, in Mahabad

== September 30, 1954 (Thursday) ==
- The USS Nautilus (SSN-571), the first nuclear-powered submarine in the world, is commissioned into the U.S. Navy.
