= May 1954 =

Month of 1954

<<	May 1954					>>
Su	Mo	Tu	We	Th	Fr	Sa
						1
2	3	4	5	6	7	8
9	10	11	12	13	14	15
16	17	18	19	20	21	22
23	24	25	26	27	28	29
30	31

The following events occurred in May 1954:

== May 1, 1954 (Saturday) ==
- The Unification Church was founded in South Korea, by Sun Myung Moon, under the name Holy Spirit Association for the Unification of World Christianity (HSA-UWC).
- A general strike began in Honduras, lasting until July.
- The Myasishchev M-4, the first Soviet bomber which was claimed to have the ability to reach the United States and return to the Soviet Union, was displayed to the public for the first time at the Moscow May Day parade.
- The 1954 Asian Games opened in Manila, Philippines, lasting until May 9.
- The Film Censorship Board of Malaysia was established.
- Born: Maatia Toafa, Tuvaluan politician, twice prime minister
- Died: Tom Tyler, 50, US actor, of heart failure and complications from scleroderma

== May 2, 1954 (Sunday) ==
- Adnan Menderes of the Democrat Party formed the new (21st) government of Turkey after a landslide victory in the country's general election.
- Yitzhak Ben-Zvi, the President of Israel, visited the Shrine of the Báb, a centre of the Baháʼí Faith, the first time that the head of an independent state had visited a Baha'i sacred site.
- The US-registered 1,007-ton barge A F L 1654 was wrecked on the coast of Montague Island, off the coast of the Territory of Alaska.

== May 3, 1954 (Monday) ==
- Died: Józef Garbień, 57, Polish footballer and physician

== May 4, 1954 (Tuesday) ==
- Photographer Orlando Suero traveled to Georgetown (Washington, D.C.) to spend several days on a photoshoot with the recently married Senator John F. Kennedy and his wife Jackie.

== May 5, 1954 (Wednesday) ==
- In Paraguay, President Federico Chávez was ousted in a violent coup led by General Alfredo Stroessner, and was replaced by Tomás Romero Pereira, who later ceded power to Stroessner.
- The Maggio Musicale Fiorentino opened in Florence, Italy, with a performance of Gaspare Spontini's opera, Agnese di Hohenstaufen.
- Died: Henri Laurens, 69, French sculptor

== May 6, 1954 (Thursday) ==
- Roger Bannister ran the first sub-four minute mile, at the Iffley Road track in Oxford, England.
- A United States Navy Martin PBM-5 Mariner flying boat crashed into mountains near Carricitos, Mexico, killing all 10 people on board.
- Died: B. C. Forbes, 73, Scottish-born US journalist and publisher

== May 7, 1954 (Friday) ==
- First Indochina War: The Battle of Dien Bien Phu ended in a French defeat.

== May 8, 1954 (Saturday) ==
- The Asian Football Confederation (AFC) was formed in Manila, Philippines.
- In England and Wales, the 1954 County Championship cricket tournament opened with matches at Bristol, Derby, Manchester, Northampton, Nottingham, Lord's and Kennington Oval.

== May 9, 1954 (Sunday) ==
- The US-registered 9-ton, 32.6-foot (9.9 m) fishing vessel Sinbad sank at Gravina Point in Prince William Sound on the coast of the Territory of Alaska.

== May 10, 1954 (Monday) ==
- The Japanese cargo ship Tatsuwa Maru sprang a leak 500 nautical miles (930 km) west of Manila, Philippines. It is thought to have foundered with the loss of all 50 crew.

== May 11, 1954 (Tuesday) ==
- The U.S. Secretary of State, John Foster Dulles, declared that Indochina was important but not essential to the security of Southeast Asia, thus ending any prospect of American intervention on the side of France (→ proposed Operation Vulture).

== May 13, 1954 (Thursday) ==
- On the day after the deadline for all male British subjects and Federal citizens between the ages of 18 and 20 to register for part-time National Service, a peaceful demonstration by students turned into a riot, resulting in multiple injuries and arrests.
- Australia's government established a Royal Commission on Espionage to look into the "Petrov Affair", events surrounding the defection of a Soviet diplomat.
- The World Chess Championship was won by Mikhail Botvinnik in Moscow.
- Born: Johnny Logan, Irish singer and songwriter, in Melbourne, Australia, as Seán Patrick Michael Sherrard

== May 14, 1954 (Friday) ==
- The Boeing 707 was released after about two years of development.
- The Hague Convention for the Protection of Cultural Property in the Event of Armed Conflict was adopted in The Hague, Netherlands.
- The British tug Harrington capsized and sank at Swansea, Wales, with the loss of two of her six crew.
- Died: Heinz Guderian, 65, German World War II general

== May 15, 1954 (Saturday) ==
- The Latin Union (Unión Latina) was created by the Convention of Madrid. Its member countries used the five Romance languages: Italian, French, Spanish, Portuguese, and Romanian. It would suspend operations in 2012.
- The US-registered 11-ton fishing vessel Loyal was destroyed by fire in Kimshan Cove in Southeast Alaska.

== May 16, 1954 (Sunday) ==
- The Kengir uprising broke out at a Soviet labour camp for political prisoners in the Kazakh SSR. Prisoners forced the guards and camp administration out, and an internal "government" was set up. The uprising lasted for over a month until forcibly suppressed by Soviet government troops.

== May 17, 1954 (Monday) ==
- Brown v. Board of Education of Topeka (347 US 483 1954): The U.S. Supreme Court ruled unanimously that segregated schools were unconstitutional.

== May 18, 1954 (Tuesday) ==
- Chinese Civil War, First Taiwan Strait Crisis: The People's Liberation Army Navy auxiliary gunboat Rujin was sunk by Nationalist Republic P-47 Thunderbolt aircraft, resulting in 56 deaths.

== May 19, 1954 (Wednesday) ==
- Pakistan and the United States signed a Mutual Defense Assistance Agreement.
- Died: Charles Ives, 79, US composer

== May 20, 1954 (Thursday) ==
- Chiang Kai-shek was reelected as the president of the Republic of China by the National Assembly.

== May 21, 1954 (Friday) ==
- The 1954 Giro d'Italia cycle race began in Palermo, continuing until 13 June. Favourite Fausto Coppi and his team won the team time trial on the first day.

== May 22, 1954 (Saturday) ==
- The US-registered 19-ton fishing vessel Flamingo sank off the Outer Rocks in Khaz Bay, Southeast Alaska.
- Died: Chief Bender, 70, Native American baseball player (Philadelphia Athletics) and a member of the MLB Hall of Fame (prostate cancer)

== May 23, 1954 (Sunday) ==
- In a friendly international at the Nepstadion in Budapest, the Hungary national football team defeated England by 7 goals to 1. Sándor Kocsis and Ferenc Puskás were among Hungary's goal scorers in what remains England's worst defeat of all time.
- Born: Gerry Armstrong, former Northern Irish football player and coach, who was the highest scoring player from the UK in the 1982 FIFA World Cup; including a shock winner against hosts Spain.

== May 25, 1954 (Tuesday) ==
- Yu Hung-chun (O. K. Yui) was elected Prime Minister of the Republic of China (Taiwan).
- Born: Tantely Andrianarivo, Madagascan politician, prime minister 1998–2002 (d. 2023)
- Died: Robert Capa, 40, Hungarian-born photojournalist, killed by a land mine while reporting on the First Indochina War.

== May 26, 1954 (Wednesday) ==
- A fire on board the U.S. Navy aircraft carrier USS Bennington off Narragansett Bay, Massachusetts, killed 103 sailors and injured many others.
- The first tropical storm of the 1954 Atlantic hurricane season formed over Florida.
- Died: Omer Nishani, 67, Albanian politician (probable suicide)

== May 28, 1954 (Friday) ==
- Born: João Carlos de Oliveira, Brazilian athlete, in Pindamonhangaba, São Paulo (d. 1999)

== May 29, 1954 (Saturday) ==
- Robert Menzies's government was reelected for a fourth term in Australia.
- The first meeting of the Bilderberg group opened at the Hotel de Bilderberg in Oosterbeek, Netherlands.
- Diane Leather became the first woman to run a sub-five minute mile, in Birmingham, UK.
- The French Open tennis tournament concluded, with Tony Trabert as the men's singles champion and Maureen Connolly as the women's.

== May 30, 1954 (Sunday) ==
- The Hungarian passenger steamboat Pajtás capsized and sank on Lake Balaton, near Balatonfüred. Twenty-three of the 178 passengers were killed.
- Turkey's Kırşehir Province became part of Nevşehir Province, after supporting the political opposition in the election of May 2.

== May 31, 1954 (Monday) ==
- The 1954 Indianapolis 500 motor race was won by Bill Vukovich.
- In Canada, Winnipeg's first television station, CBWT, broadcast its first programmes.
- A Douglas C-47A-80-DL Skytrain operated by Transportes Aéreos Nacionales, on a flight from Governador Valadares Airport to Belo Horizonte-Pampulha Airport in Belo Horizonte, Brazil, went 48 kilometres (30 mi) off-course and crashed into Mount Cipó in the Serra do Cipó Mountains, killing all 19 people on board.
