= December 1954 =

Month of 1954

| << | December 1954 | | | | | >> |
| Su | Mo | Tu | We | Th | Fr | Sa |
| | | | 1 | 2 | 3 | 4 |
| 5 | 6 | 7 | 8 | 9 | 10 | 11 |
| 12 | 13 | 14 | 15 | 16 | 17 | 18 |
| 19 | 20 | 21 | 22 | 23 | 24 | 25 |
| 26 | 27 | 28 | 29 | 30 | 31 |

The following events occurred in December 1954:

== December 1, 1954 (Wednesday) ==
- The Estádio da Luz football stadium opens in Lisbon, Portugal.
- The first Hyatt Hotel, The Hyatt House Los Angeles, opens on the grounds of Los Angeles International Airport, USA. It is the first hotel in the world built on an airport property.
- Died: Fred Rose, 57, US songwriter

== December 2, 1954 (Thursday) ==
- Second Red Scare: The United States Senate votes 67–22 to condemn Joseph McCarthy for "conduct that tends to bring the Senate into dishonor and disrepute."
- The Taiwan-United States Mutual Defense Treaty is signed.

== December 3, 1954 (Friday) ==
- Mustafa Ben Halim, Prime Minister of Libya, adds the role of Foreign Minister of Libya to his portfolio.
- A West German court dismisses the charges against Werner Naumann, head of the Neo-Nazi Naumann Circle.
- Väinö Linna's war novel The Unknown Soldier (Tuntematon sotilas) is published.

== December 4, 1954 (Saturday) ==
- The first Burger King opens in Miami, Florida, USA.
- The first commercial flight by Air Laos from Vientiane to Muang Sing, with stops at Luang Prabang and Luang Namtha, by a Douglas C-47A-70-DL Skytrain (registration F-BEIA), ends in tragedy when the aircraft crashes during the Luang Prabang-to-Luang Namtha leg, killing all 28 people on board.
- Born: Tony Todd, American actor, known for his Candyman role (d. 2024).

== December 5, 1954 (Sunday) ==
- West Berlin state election, 1954: The Social Democratic Party of Germany wins an outright majority, but agrees to enter into a coalition with the Christian Democratic Union of Germany because of the tense political situation in Berlin.

== December 6, 1954 (Monday) ==
- Born:
  - Nicola De Maria, Italian painter
  - Chris Stamey, American singer-songwriter, musician, and music producer

== December 7, 1954 (Tuesday) ==
- Operation Passage to Freedom: Bui Van Luong is replaced as the head of COMIGAL, Vietnam's government resettlement agency, by Pham Van Huyen.
- Born: Pascal Renwick, French voice actor (d. 2006).

== December 8, 1954 (Wednesday) ==
- A Hellenic Air Force Douglas C-47 Skytrain crashes at Elefsis Air Base in Greece, killing all 19 people on board.
- The Autonomous University of Chihuahua is founded in Mexico.
- Died:
  - Claude Cahun, 60, French photographer and writer
  - Gladys George, 50, US actress (brain haemorrhage)

== December 9, 1954 (Thursday) ==
- Born:
  - Jean-Claude Juncker, Luxembourger lawyer and politician, Prime Minister of Luxembourg
  - Henk ten Cate, Dutch footballer and manager

== December 10, 1954 (Friday) ==
- Ichirō Hatoyama becomes Prime Minister of Japan.
- U.S. Air Force scientist John Stapp makes his 29th and last decelerator sled ride at Holloman Air Force Base in New Mexico, demonstrating that a human can withstand at least 46.2 g (in the forward position, with adequate harnessing). This is the highest known acceleration voluntarily encountered by a human. Stapp reaches a speed of 632 mph (1,017 km/h), which breaks the land speed record and makes him the fastest man on Earth.

== December 11, 1954 (Saturday) ==
- The supercarrier USS Forrestal is christened in Newport News, Virginia. A Vought F7U-3 Cutlass crashes while performing a low-altitude high-speed pass during the ceremony, killing the pilot, Lieutenant J.W. Hood.
- Born:
  - Sylvester Clarke, West Indian cricketer, in Christ Church, Barbados (died 1999)
  - Puspa Kamal Dahal, Nepalese Politician, in Dhikuri Pokhari, Kaski, Nepal

== December 12, 1954 (Sunday) ==
- Live transmission of the BBC's ground-breaking adaptation of Nineteen Eighty-Four, starring Peter Cushing, takes place on UK television.

== December 13, 1954 (Monday) ==
- The Wolverhampton Wanderers F.C. v Budapest Honvéd FC football match takes place in Wolverhampton, UK, and is broadcast live by the BBC. The match will be instrumental in the eventual establishment of the European Cup.
- The final match of the 1953–54 European Rugby League Championship is played, with England finishing on top of the tournament ladder to claim the championship.
- Died: Ed Sanders, 30, U.S. heavyweight boxer, hours after the previous night's bout with Willie James, New England Heavyweight Champion, in Boston, Massachusetts. Sanders, felled by a simple punch combination, loses consciousness and dies after a long surgery to relieve bleeding in the brain.

== December 14, 1954 (Tuesday) ==
- Born: Alan Kulwicki, US race car driver, in Greenfield, Wisconsin (died 1993)

== December 15, 1954 (Wednesday) ==
- The Netherlands Antilles is created out of the Dutch Caribbean nations. It is later dissolved between 1986 and 2010.
- British T-class submarine HMS Talent is swept out of her dock at HMNB Chatham when a caisson collapses, and runs aground in the River Medway. Four people are killed. The submarine was later repaired and returned to service.

== December 17, 1954 (Friday) ==
- President Dwight D. Eisenhower presents James H. "Dutch" Kindleberger and the North American Aviation F-100 Super Sabre design team with the Collier Trophy in recognition of their contributions to aviation.

== December 18, 1954 (Saturday) ==
- Making its fourth attempt to land at Idlewild Airport in Queens, New York, a Linee Aeree Italiane Douglas DC-6B (registration I-LINE) strikes the pier supporting Runway 04's slope line approach lights, crashes in flames, and sinks in Jamaica Bay, killing 26 of the 32 people on board.
- The Swedish ship Hispania strikes a rock in the Sound of Mull and sinks with the loss of her captain.
- Born: Ray Liotta, American actor, in Newark, New Jersey (d. 2022)

== December 20, 1954 (Monday) ==
- Born: Sandra Cisneros, American author (House on Mango Street), in Chicago
- Died: James Hilton, 54, English novelist (liver cancer)

== December 21, 1954 (Tuesday) ==
- Died: Edwin G. Seibels, inventor of the vertical filing system, 88.

== December 22, 1954 (Wednesday) ==
- Johnson Flying Service Flight 4844C, a Douglas C-47A-90-DL Skytrain (registration N24320) on a civil air movement flight of military personnel to Tacoma, Washington, ditches in the Monongahela River near Pittsburgh, Pennsylvania, due to fuel exhaustion during a leg of its flight from Newark Metropolitan Airport in Newark, New Jersey, to Allegheny County Airport in Pittsburgh, killing 10 of the 28 people on board.

== December 23, 1954 (Thursday) ==
- J. Hartwell Harrison and Joseph Murray perform the world's first successful kidney transplant in Boston, Massachusetts.
- Died: René Iché, 57, French sculptor (b. 1897)

== December 24, 1954 (Friday) ==
- Laos gains full independence from France.

== December 25, 1954 (Saturday) ==
- 1954 Prestwick air disaster: The British Overseas Airways Corporation Boeing 377 Stratocruiser G-ALSA crashes on landing at Glasgow Prestwick Airport from London in poor visibility at 03:30, killing 28 of the 36 passengers and crew on board.
- A small annular solar eclipse covered only 93% of the Sun in a very broad path, 262 km wide at maximum, and lasted 7 minutes and 39.03 seconds, occurring 177.8 days after the total solar eclipse of June 30, 1954.

== December 26, 1954 (Sunday) ==
- The 1954 Asian Baseball Championship ends in victory for the Philippines.
- The 1954 NFL Championship Game takes place at Cleveland Municipal Stadium, Cleveland, Ohio, USA, and is won by the Cleveland Browns.
- Born: Ozzie Smith, American baseball player, in Mobile, Alabama

== December 27, 1954 (Monday) ==
- Born: Teo Chee Hean, Singaporean politician, 5th Senior Minister of Singapore

== December 28, 1954 (Tuesday) ==
- Sampurnanand becomes Chief Minister of Uttar Pradesh, India.
- The All India Democratic Students Organisation is founded.
- Born: Denzel Washington, American actor, in Mount Vernon, New York

== December 29, 1954 (Wednesday) ==
- The United States defeat Australia in Sydney, to win the 1954 Davis Cup.
- The very first British-animated film, Animal Farm, premieres.
- Born: Norihito, Prince Takamado, Japanese prince, in Tokyo (died 2002)

== December 30, 1954 (Thursday) ==
- Died: Archduke Eugen of Austria, 91, Austrian field marshal

== December 31, 1954 (Friday) ==
- An Aeroflot airliner – possibly an Ilyushin Il-14 – crashes on takeoff from Irkutsk Airport in Irkutsk in the Soviet Union, killing all 17 people on board.
- Liberian tanker World Peace collides with the El Ferdan Railway Bridge, Suez Canal, Ismailia, Egypt. The canal is blocked as part of the bridge ends up across the deck of World Peace.
- The first specimens of the mineral benstonite are collected by Orlando J. Benston in the Magnet Cove igneous complex of Arkansas, USA.
