= November 1954 =

Month of 1954

<<	November 1954					>>
Su	Mo	Tu	We	Th	Fr	Sa
	1	2	3	4	5	6
7	8	9	10	11	12	13
14	15	16	17	18	19	20
21	22	23	24	25	26	27
28	29	30

The following events occurred in November 1954:

== November 1, 1954 (Monday) ==
- In Algeria, the FLN attacks representatives and public buildings of the French colonial power.

== November 2, 1954 (Tuesday) ==
- The vertical -takeoff-or-landing (VTOL) Convair XFY transitions from vertical to horizontal flight and back.
- 1954 Pennsylvania gubernatorial election: Democrat State Senator George Leader defeats the Republican incumbent Lieutenant Governor Lloyd H. Wood to become Governor of the US state of Pennsylvania.
- A dock workers' strike in the UK comes to an end.
- The radio programme Hancock's Half Hour, a pioneer in situation comedy, is first broadcast on BBC Radio. A television version would follow in 1956.

== November 3, 1954 (Wednesday) ==
- The first Godzilla film is premiered in Tokyo. Approximately 9,610,000 tickets are sold, making it the eighth best-attended film in Japan that year.
- Died: Henri Matisse, 84, French painter

== November 4, 1954 (Thursday) ==
- Two by-elections are held in the UK:
  - In the Sutton and Cheam by-election, brought about by the resignation of the Conservative MP Sydney Marshall, the seat is retained by the Conservative candidate Richard Sharples.
  - In the Morpeth by-election, brought about by the death of the incumbent Labour MP, Robert Taylor, Will Owen retains the seat for Labour.

== November 5, 1954 (Friday) ==
- Japan and Burma sign a peace treaty in Rangoon, to end their long-extinct state of war.

== November 6, 1954 (Saturday) ==
- In the Valdostan regional election in Italy, the Christian Democracy–Italian Liberal Party coalition wins an overall majority, with 40.7% of the vote.
- M. R. Radha's most successful film, Ratha Kanneer, is released in India.

== November 7, 1954 (Sunday) ==
- In the 1954 Bulgarian Cup Final, PFC CSKA Sofia defeat PFC Slavia Sofia 2–1.
- Soviet Air Force MiG-15 fighters shoot down a U.S. Air Force B-29 Superfortress off Hokkaidō, Japan. The Soviet Union claims the B-29 was spying.
- Born: Kamal Haasan, Indian actor, director, screenwriter, playback singer

== November 8, 1954 (Monday) ==
- The Faroese general election ends in victory for the Union Party, which emerges as the largest party in the Løgting, winning 7 of the 27 seats.
- The foundation stone of St. Joseph's Church, East Wall, Dublin, Ireland, is blessed.
- Born: Rickie Lee Jones, American singer and songwriter, in Chicago, Illinois

== November 10, 1954 (Wednesday) ==
- U.S. President Dwight D. Eisenhower dedicates the USMC War Memorial (Iwo Jima memorial) at the Arlington National Cemetery.

== November 11, 1954 (Thursday) ==
- Based on a US Congress amendment passed on June 1, 1954, this is the first observance of "Veterans Day", replacing the name "Armistice Day" in the United States. President Dwight D. Eisenhower issued a proclamation in October 1954 acknowledging that the United States had been engaged in two wars since Armistice Day was first observed.

== November 12, 1954 (Friday) ==
- The main immigration port-of-entry in New York Harbor at Ellis Island closes permanently.
- The newly launched tanker Scottish Hawk runs aground in the Clyde at Greenock, Renfrewshire, Scotland.

== November 13, 1954 (Saturday) ==
- In the New Zealand general election, the governing National Party is re-elected with a ten-seat margin.
- Great Britain defeat France in the final of the 1954 Rugby League World Cup at Parc des Princes.
- Born: Chris Noth, American actor, in Madison, Wisconsin
- Died: Paul Ludwig Ewald von Kleist, 73, German field marshal (b. 1881)

== November 14, 1954 (Sunday) ==
- Egyptian president Muhammad Naguib is deposed, and Gamal Abdel Nasser replaces him.
- Chinese Civil War: The Chinese destroyer escort Tai Ping is torpedoed and sunk off the Tachen Islands with the loss of 40 of her crew of about 200.
- Born: Bernard Hinault, French road cyclist, 10 titles on Grand Tour and five titles on Grand Prix des Nations, in Yffiniac, Brittany Region, France.

== November 15, 1954 (Monday) ==
- Died: Lionel Barrymore, American actor (b. 1878)

== November 16, 1954 (Tuesday) ==
- A TAM Peru Douglas DC-3 (registration FAP403) on a domestic flight in Peru from Pucallpa Airport in Pucallpa to Limatambo Airport in Lima crashes into an ice wall near Jirishanca at an altitude of 18,000 feet (5,500 meters), killing all 24 people on board. The wreckage is not found until December 4.
- Born:
  - Andrea Barrett, American novelist; in Boston
  - Bruce Edwards, American golf caddy (d. 2004)
- Died: Albert Francis Blakeslee, American botanist (b. 1874)

== November 17, 1954 (Wednesday) ==
- A U.S. Air Force B-47 Stratojet is forced by bad weather to remain aloft for 47 hours 35 minutes, needing nine aerial refuellings.
- Died: Yitzhak Lamdan, 55, Russian-born Israeli poet and columnist

== November 18, 1954 (Thursday) ==
- The first public showing of Yves Klein's work takes place in Madrid.

== November 19, 1954 (Friday) ==
- The Korean Cold War between the communist North and the capitalist South begins over a year after the conclusion of the Korean War.
- Born: Abdel Fattah el-Sisi, President of Egypt, in Cairo
- Died: L.B. Billinton, Last C.M.E of the LB&SCR

== November 20, 1954 (Saturday) ==
- Died: Clyde Vernon Cessna, 74, US aircraft designer, aviator, and founder of the Cessna Aircraft Corporation.

== November 21, 1954 (Sunday) ==
- People's Action Party, a political party in Singapore, was founded by a group of politicians including the eventual inaugural Prime Minister of Singapore Lee Kuan Yew.

== November 22, 1954 (Monday) ==
- The U.S. Supreme Court decides the landmark case Berman v. Parker (348 U.S. 26), upholding the federal slum clearance and urban renewal programs.
- Died:
  - Jess McMahon, 72, US professional boxing and wrestling promoter; founder of Capitol Wrestling Corporation
  - Andrey Vyshinsky, 70, Russian jurist and diplomat (b. 1883)

== November 23, 1954 (Tuesday) ==
- The Dow Jones Industrial Average rises 3.27 points, or 0.86 percent, closing at an all-time high of 382.74. More significantly, this is the first time the Dow has surpassed its peak level reached just before the Wall Street Crash of 1929.

== November 24, 1954 (Wednesday) ==
- Born: Emir Kusturica, Serbian filmmaker, actor and musician, in Sarajevo

== November 25, 1954 (Thursday) ==
- Hungary acquires all of the Soviet Union's shares of Maszovlet and renames the airline Malév Hungarian Airlines.

== November 26, 1954 (Friday) ==
- Dutch coaster Tarpo sinks off The Lizard, Cornwall, United Kingdom, with the loss of all twelve crew.
- Born: Velupillai Prabhakaran, LTTE leader of Tamils Liberation Tigers in Sri Lanka.

== November 27, 1954 (Saturday) ==
- The South Goodwin Lightship capsizes on the Goodwin Sands in the UK with the loss of all seven crewmen. The only survivor is a Ministry of Agriculture scientist who had been on board bird-watching.

== November 28, 1954 (Sunday) ==
- Died: Enrico Fermi, 53, Italian physicist, Nobel Prize laureate (stomach cancer)

== November 29, 1954 (Monday) ==
- In the Czechoslovak parliamentary election, voters can vote for or against a single list of Communist-controlled National Front candidates.
- Finnish coaster Gustav is reported to be listing severely 20 nautical miles (37 km) north east of the Channel Islands.

== November 30, 1954 (Tuesday) ==
- In Sylacauga, Alabama, USA, a four-kilogram piece of the Hodges Meteorite crashes through the roof of a house and badly bruises a napping woman, in the first documented case of an object from outer space hitting a person.
- British cargo ship Tresillian founders in St George's Channel, 44 nautical miles (81 km) off Cork, Ireland with the loss of 24 of her 40 crew. Sixteen survivors are rescued by SS Liparus and transferred to the Irish navy ship Maev and land at Cobh.
- Died: Wilhelm Furtwängler, 68, German conductor and composer
