= Cleft Island (Antarctica) =

Island in Antarctica

- Location within Antarctica

Geography
- Location: Antarctica
- Coordinates: 69°21′S 75°38′E

Administration
- Administered under the Antarctic Treaty System

Demographics
- Population: Uninhabited

Cleft Island is a small island to the north of the Bølingen Islands, lying 5 kilometres (2.5 nmi) southeast of Lichen Island in southern Prydz Bay. The island is split by a deep channel about 6 metres (20 ft) wide. The island was plotted from air photos taken by the Lars Christensen Expedition, 1936–37, and called Lorten by Norwegian cartographers. The feature was visited by an Australian National Antarctic Research Expeditions party from the Nella Dan in February 1966 and renamed with reference to the deep channel.

== See also ==
- List of Antarctic and sub-Antarctic islands
