= Teewah Beach =

Beach in Queensland, Australia

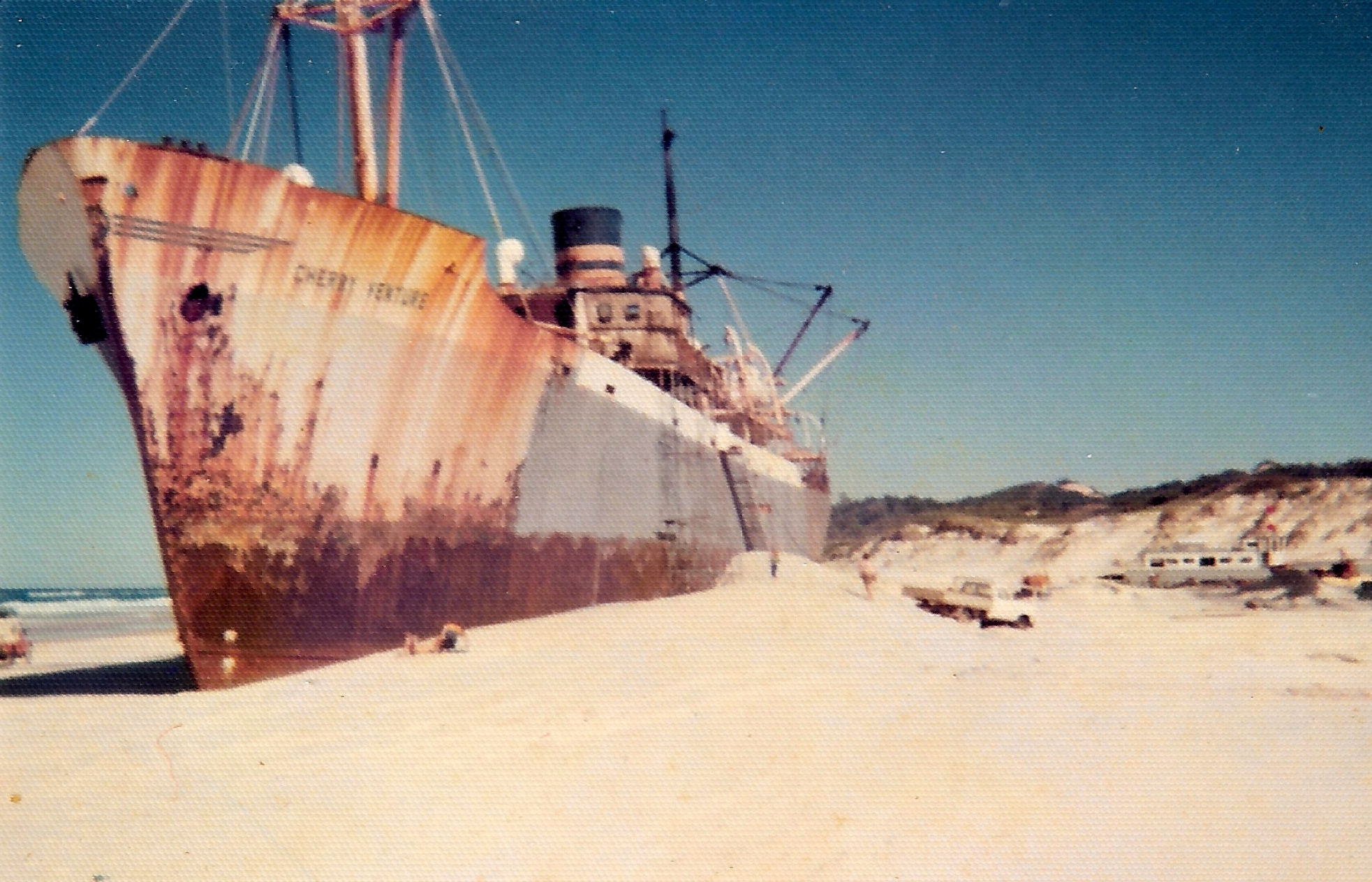
The Cherry Venture shipwreck

Teewah Beach is a beach that extends from Double Island Point in Cooloola, Gympie Region through Noosa North Shore in the Shire of Noosa to the Noosa River in Queensland, Australia. It is part of the Great Sandy National Park. The beach extends from approximately 25°56'11"S, 153°11'18"E to 26°22'44"S, 153°04'38"E, a distance of about 51 kilometres.

== Use as a road ==
For much of its length it is a designated road under Queensland government legislation. The beach provides a convenient access way to Rainbow Beach and Fraser Island for many 4WD enthusiasts. It is also a much sought-after destination in itself for those seeking a bush camping experience on the beach. Fees apply for camping. The Noosa North Shore area is not open to vehicular traffic.

The use of the beach by 4WD enthusiasts is a contentious issue. Many environmentalists see the 4WD car as a factor in the degradation of beach eco-systems. Others see it as their only means of experiencing a wilderness area and good fishing. As the beach is currently quite heavily used during holiday periods, fast moving vehicles can endanger those using the beach for recreation. Although the Queensland Government introduced vehicle access fees for use of the beach by vehicles, road safety issues remain a major concern.

== Cherry Venture ==
The Singapore-registered cargo ship Cherry Venture ran aground here on 8 July 1973. It has been some time now since one could see the wreck on the beach. Its rusting hulk was removed in 2007 as being too dangerous to the many tourists who loved to climb through it against all warnings. The stainless steel propeller rests at Rainbow Beach as a monument.

== Teewah Coloured Sands ==
The Teewah Coloured Sands are a stretch of sand cliffs along Teewah Beach within Noosa North Shore (26°16′00″S 153°04′00″E). The cliffs are up to 200 metres in height and the sand is in a range of colours, created through natural combinations of iron oxide and vegetable dyes.
