= Cherry Venture =

Australian shipwreck in 1973

Coordinates: 25°57′42.00″S 153°10′26.14″E

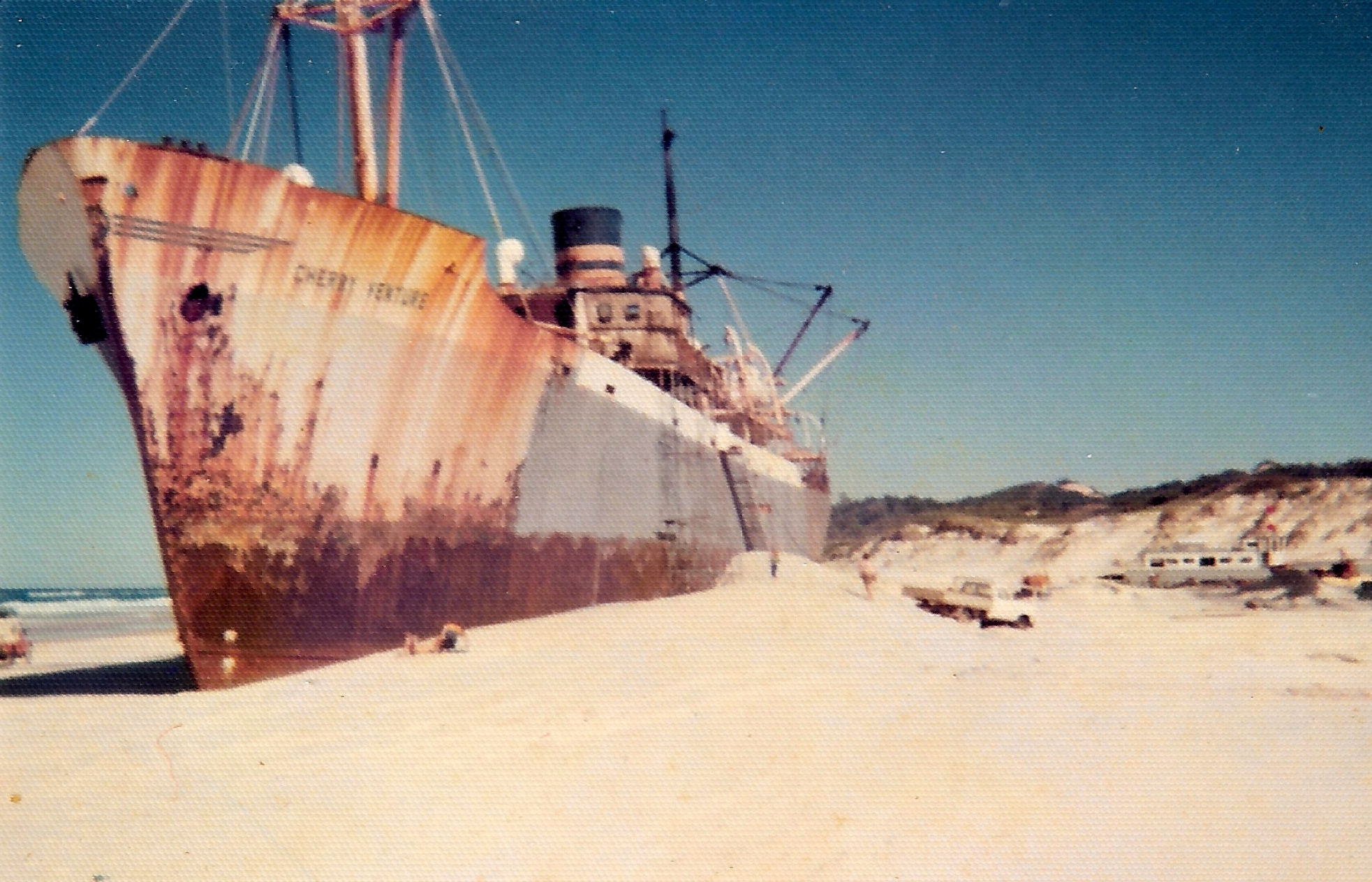
- The shipwreck in the 1970s

History
- Name: Cherry Venture
- Route: Auckland to Brisbane
- Builder: Lindholmens varv, Gothenburg
- Completed: 1944
- Out of service: 1973
- Fate: Shipwrecked
- Status: Demolished

General characteristics
- Tonnage: 1600

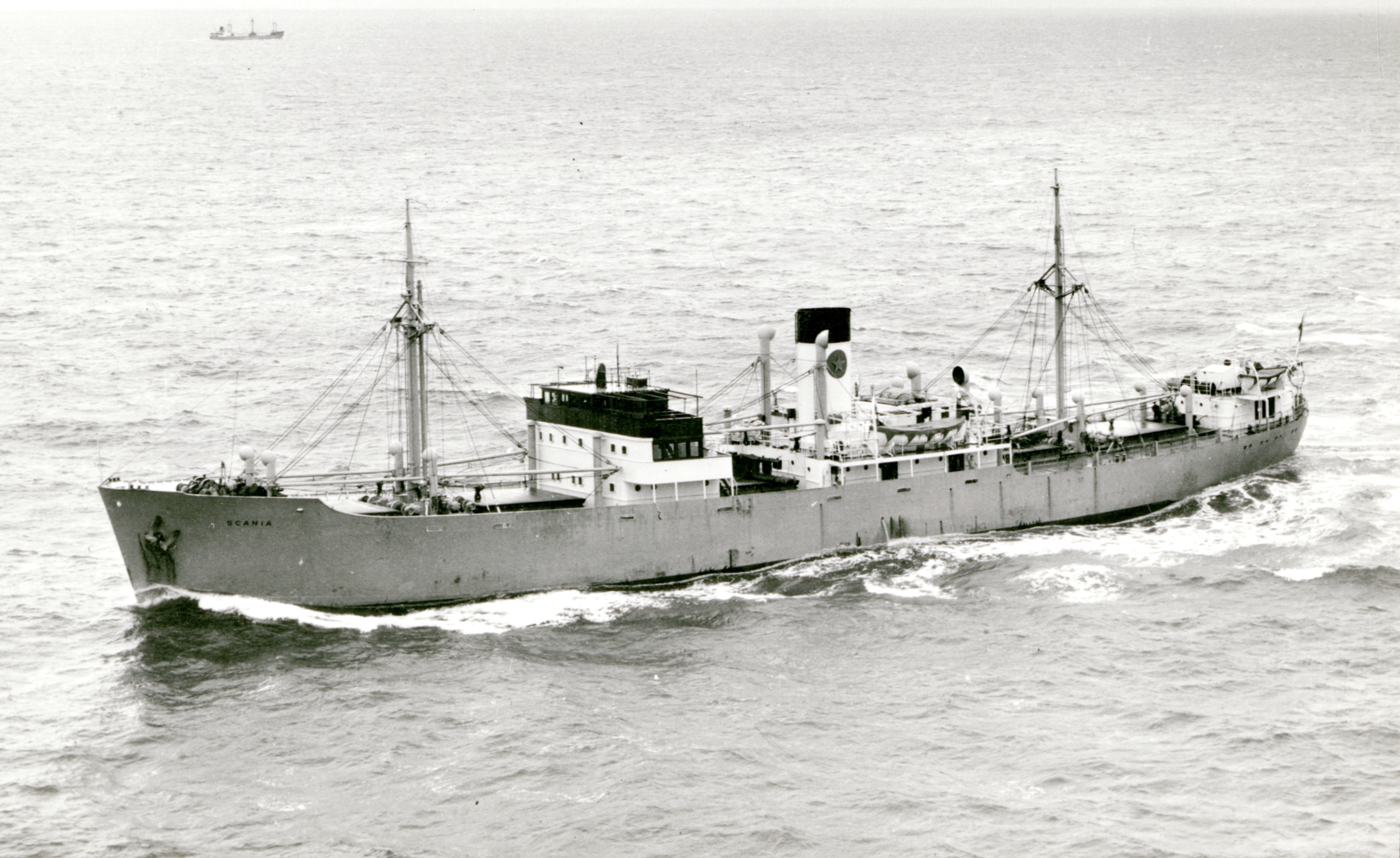
Underway as Scania in 1956

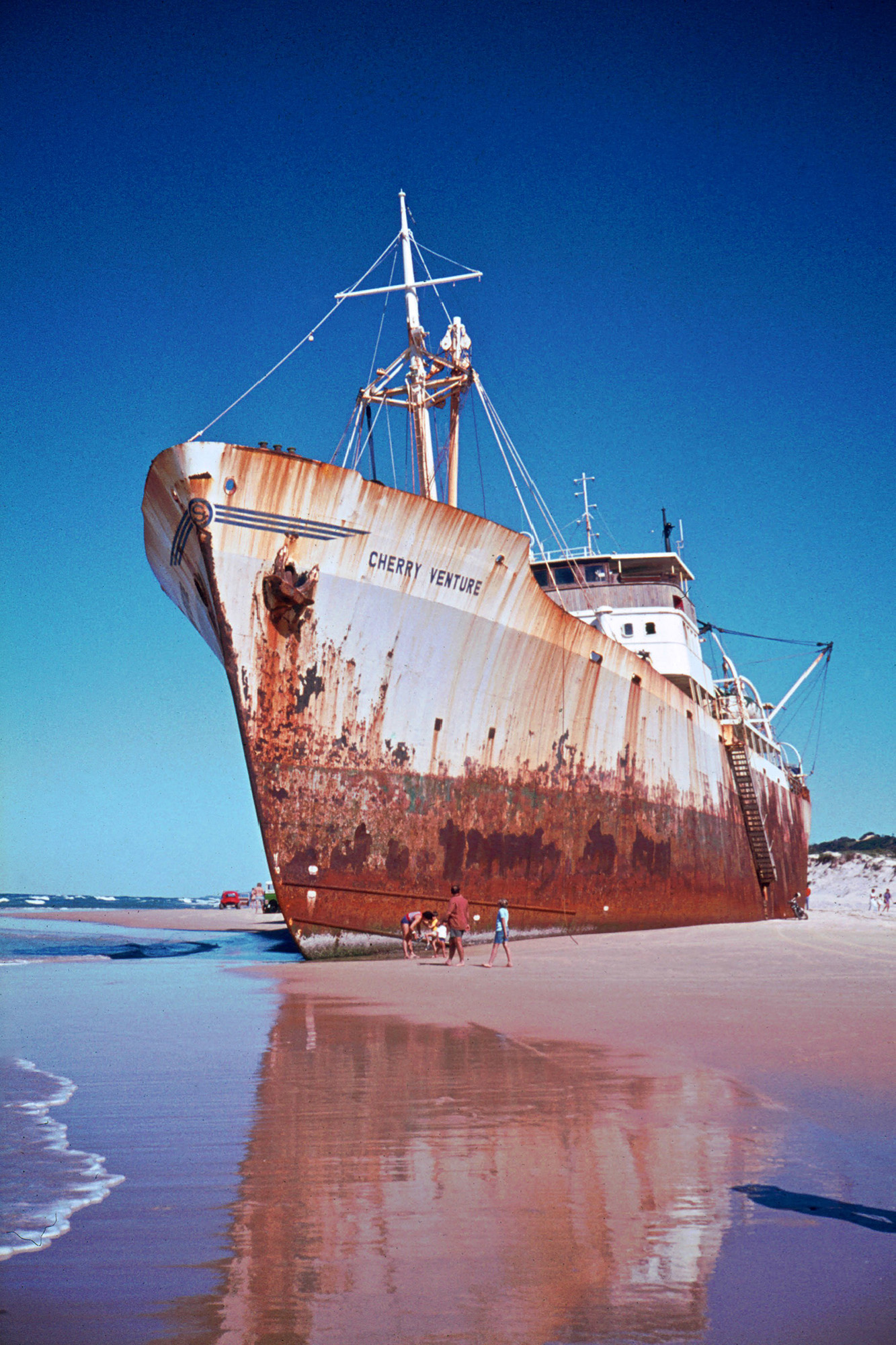
Cherry Venture circa 1974

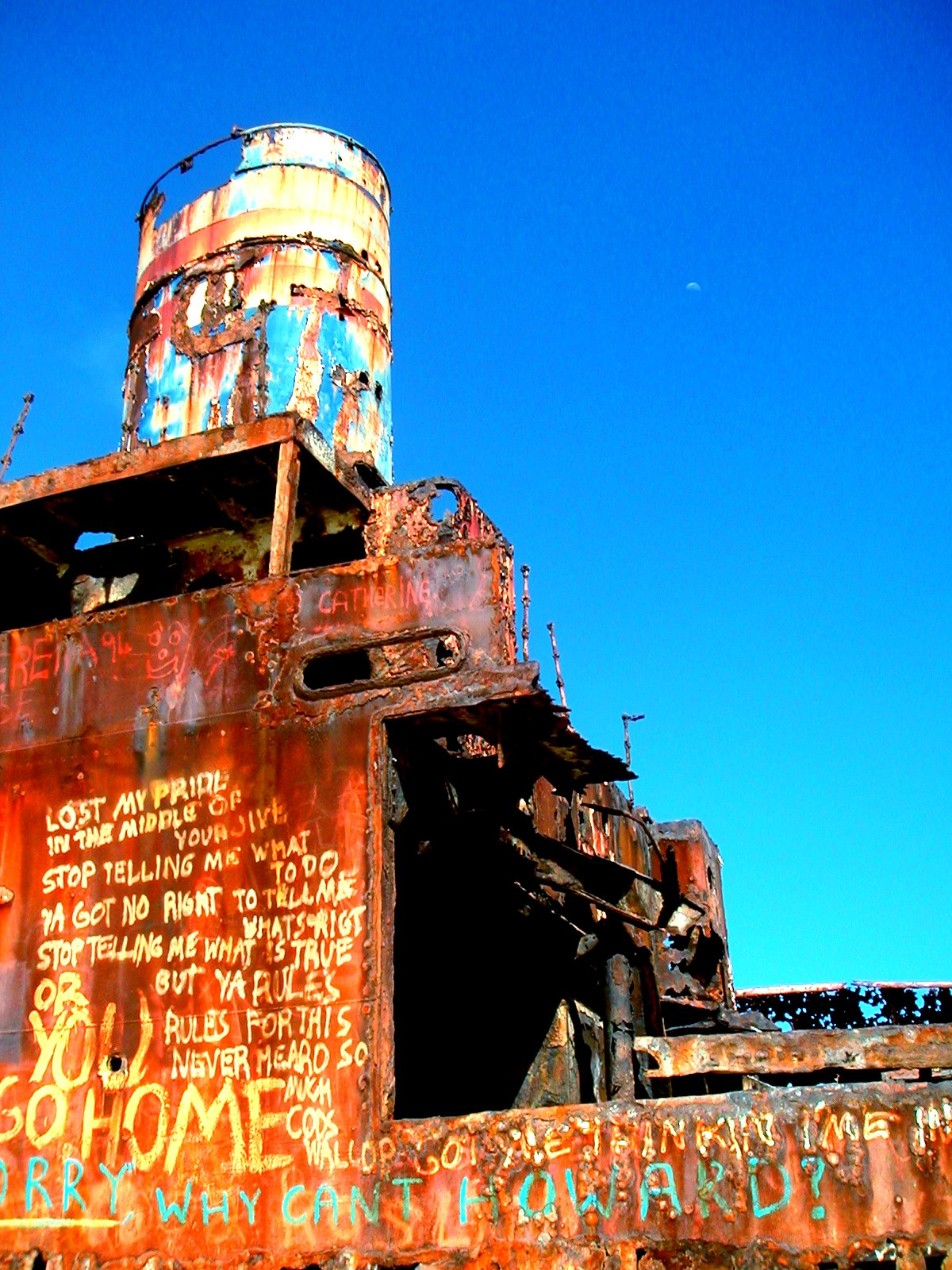
Cherry Venture pictured in 2002

Cherry Venture was a 1600-ton cargo ship of Scandinavian origin. It ran aground on Teewah Beach in South East Queensland, Australia on 6 July 1973 and remained on the beach for 34 years until its removal in early 2007.

== History ==
The ship, originally named the Scania, was built in Gothenburg, Sweden in 1945. She was later called the Slott and Timor Venture. In 1973, she was owned by Sea Tankers Pty Ltd of Singapore and known as the Cherry Venture.

== Cause of the wreck ==
The wreck of the Cherry Venture occurred when the ship was travelling from Auckland to Brisbane, under the command of Captain Seluenu. It was caused by a combination of severe storms and a lack of cargo. Buoys in the area recorded wave heights of up to 40 ft (12 m). The ship battled against the waves for hours, facing directly into the wind and making no headway, before her captain issued a mayday call at 6:50am. 9 Squadron RAAF, based at Amberley air base, answered that call, dispatching Iroquois rescue helicopters, fitted with winches, to assist in the evacuation of the ship. However, the 70 kilometres (43 mi) winds, high swell, and near impenetrable cloud cover, forced the helicopters and their crews to land at Maroochydore and await a change in the conditions.

As conditions for Cherry Venture remained catastrophic, the decision was made to evacuate, but lifeboats were ripped from their fastenings by the brutal waves, leaving crew members stranded. It was hours later, when the ship had already been washed on to the beach, that a local aviator was able to guide the Iroquois helicopters, via radio, through a dangerous, low-altitude flight path that has been considered one of the most well-executed flight missions undertaken by Australian defence forces during peace time. The flight path was previously unknown to RAAF forces and remained well below the cloud line, relying heavily on local topography to provide shelter from the gale-force winds. Although the helicopters were able to airlift all the 24 crew of the Cherry Venture to safety, including two pet monkeys, the ship was too far ashore to be assisted.

The unladen ship sat high in the water, which, when combined with the high tides and strong swell, propelled it to a point far enough up the sand that it could not be successfully re-floated, despite attempts that involved dredging the beach.

== Salvage attempts ==
Salvage rights to the wreck were purchased by Peter Vagellas, an Australian entrepreneur, who intended to re-float the vessel and convert it into a luxury liner and floating casino to serve the Great Barrier Reef. In 1977, he began unsuccessful attempts to refloat the ship. Eight major salvage efforts over the years failed, after which a fire gutted the interior of the ship and Vagellas abandoned his endeavour, after spending over a quarter of a million dollars.

== Public interest ==
The wreck was a popular attraction for tourists en route between Noosa and K'gari (Fraser Island), and was photographed often. Despite safety warnings regarding the danger of the rusting structure, visitors would often climb the wreck and explore the ship. It was popular with graffiti artists and became completely covered with scrawled messages and artwork.

== Removal ==
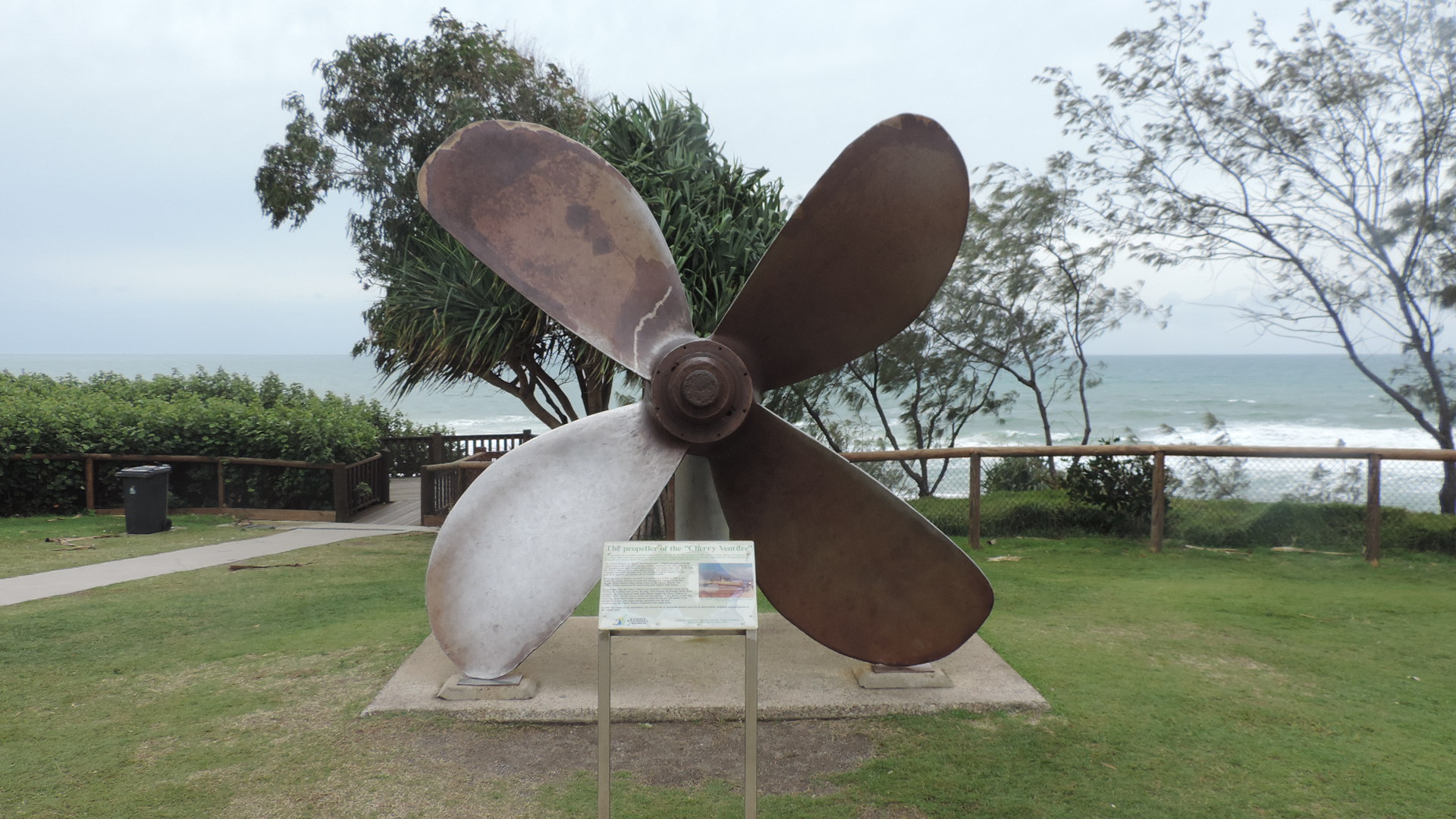
The propeller of the ship on display at Rainbow Beach, 2016

In December 1985, the ship's stainless steel propeller was removed by Bill, Tony and Bruce Dunne of Caloundra, using a thermal lance. It was later restored by the Rainbow Beach Business and Tourism Association and mounted as a monument in the township.

In late 2006, it was announced that the wreck would be broken up due to the increasing danger posed by its deterioration, including exposed asbestos in the engine room.

The removal process, which necessitated cordoning off a section of public highway which runs along the beach next to the wreck, began on 13 February 2007.

== The hull revealed ==
After the demolition of the wreck in 2007, the state government ordered the site to be covered by sand for the safety of visitors. In 2013, Cyclone Oswald and other local storms caused severe erosion which removed the layer of sand above the remains of the hull. That sparked further tourism because the wreck was, and still is, a special example of Australia's shipping history.

The hull was revealed again in 2018.

== See also ==
- Lists of shipwrecks
