= Bølingen Islands =

Group of small islands in Antarctica

- Location within Antarctica

Geography
- Location: Antarctica
- Coordinates: 69°28′S 75°45′E

Administration
- Administered under the Antarctic Treaty System

Demographics
- Population: Uninhabited

The Bølingen Islands are a group of small islands, 15 kilometres (8 nmi) in extent, lying immediately off the north side of the Publications Ice Shelf in the southeastern part of Prydz Bay. They were discovered and roughly charted by Captain Klarius Mikkelsen in February 1935, charted in greater detail by Norwegian cartographers from aerial photographs taken by the Lars Christensen Expedition (1936–37), and given the name "Bølingen " (the herd).

== See also ==
- List of antarctic and sub-antarctic islands
