= March 1955 =

Month of 1955

<<	March 1955					>>
Su	Mo	Tu	We	Th	Fr	Sa
		1	2	3	4	5
6	7	8	9	10	11	12
13	14	15	16	17	18	19
20	21	22	23	24	25	26
27	28	29	30	31

The following events occurred in March 1955:

== March 1, 1955 (Tuesday) ==
- At the Lewis Flight Propulsion Laboratory in Cleveland, Ohio, future astronaut Neil Armstrong makes his first flight as a test pilot for the National Advisory Committee for Aeronautics (NACA), the predecessor organization of NASA.
- Born:
  - Denis Mukwege, Congolese humanitarian, in Bukavu, Belgian Congo
  - Timothy Laurence, British naval officer and the second husband of Princess Anne, in Camberwell, South London.

== March 2, 1955 (Wednesday) ==
- The Hong Kong-registered cargo ship Inchkeith strikes an uncharted rock in the Bay of Bengal off Port Meadows, Andaman Islands, and is abandoned as a total loss.
- Claudette Colvin, a fifteen-year-old African-American girl, becomes the first person arrested for resisting bus segregation in Montgomery, Alabama, when she refuses to give up her seat to a white woman as demanded by the driver. She is carried off the bus backwards while being kicked and handcuffed and harassed on the way to the police station. She becomes a plaintiff in Browder v. Gayle (1956) which rules bus segregation to be unconstitutional.
- The Boeing Airplane Company receives its first major production contract for the KC-135 Stratotanker aircraft.
- Born:
  - Dale Bozzio, American rock and pop vocalist, in Medford, Massachusetts
  - Jay Osmond, American musician, in Ogden, Utah
  - Jerome Ringo, American activist, in Lake Charles, Louisiana (d. 2025)
  - Ken Salazar, American politician and diplomat, in Alamosa, Colorado
  - Shoko Asahara, Japanese cult leader, in Yatsushiro, Kumamoto Prefecture (d. 2018)

== March 3, 1955 (Thursday) ==
- The Pennsylvania Railroad runs its first "TrucTrain" piggyback train from Chicago to Kearny, NJ, the first time the Pennsylvania has carried trailers of common carrier trucking companies on its flatcars.
- Born: Andy Breckman, American TV and film writer, in Philadelphia, Pennsylvania
- Died:
  - Katharine Drexel, 96, American heiress, philanthropist, teacher and Roman Catholic saint
  - Mary Jerrold, 77, English actress
  - Rose Plumer, 79, American actress

== March 4, 1955 (Friday) ==
- The iconic Ellis Island in New York was officially determined to be surplus government property and was returned to obscurity under the jurisdiction of the General Services Administration.
- The very first radio facsimile transmission sent across the North American continent took place.
- Rising musician Elvis Presley performed a live concert at the local high school in DeKalb, Texas.
- A destructive F3 tornado touched down in Madison County, Kentucky, destroying homes, barns, and killing livestock.
- Born:
  - Dominique Pinon, French actor, in Saumur
  - Joey Jones, Welsh footballer, in Llandudno, Wales (d. 2025)
  - Khoisan X (Benny Alexander), South African political activist, in Kimberley, South Africa (d. 2010)
  - Boon Gould, English musician, in Shanklin, Isle of Wight (d. 2019)
- Died:
  - Doc Reisling, 80, American baseball player
  - Jess Tinsley, 47, American football player

== March 5, 1955 (Saturday) ==
- US TV station WBBJ-TV signs on the air in Jackson, Tennessee, with WDXI as its initial call-letters, to expanded American commercial television in mostly-rural areas.
- Elvis Presley makes his television debut on "Louisiana Hayride" carried by KSLA-TV Shreveport (although audio recordings exists, there is no known video footage of this appearance).
- Born:
  - David Gelernter, American computer scientist
  - Juraj Filas, Slovak composer, in Košice, Slovakia (d. 2021)
  - Marcia McCabe, American soap opera actress, in Pennsylvania
  - Penn Jillette, American magician and comedian, in Greenfield, Massachusetts
- Died:
  - Antanas Merkys, 68, Lithuanian politician and lawyer, served as the 16th Prime Minister of Lithuania 1939-1940 and as Acting President of Lithuania in 1940
  - William C. deMille, 76, American screenwriter and director

== March 6, 1955 (Sunday) ==
- A Douglas DC-3A (registration PP-YPZ) of Brazilian airline Real Transportes Aéreos crashes at Vitória da Conquista Airport, with 5 out of the 21 passengers and crew killed.
- Born:
  - Alberta Watson, Canadian actress, in Toronto (d. 2015)
  - Cyprien Ntaryamira, Burundian politician, 5th President of Burundi (d. 1994)

== March 7, 1955 (Monday) ==
- The 7th Emmy Awards ceremony takes place at the "Moulin Rouge Nightclub" in Hollywood, California, USA.
- The Broadway musical version of Peter Pan, which had opened in 1954 starring Mary Martin, is presented on television for the first time by NBC-TV with its original cast, as an installment of Producers' Showcase. It is also the first time that a stage musical is presented in its entirety on TV almost exactly as it was performed on stage. This program gains the largest viewership of a TV special up to this time, and it becomes one of the first great TV family musical classics.

== March 8, 1955 (Tuesday) ==
- Born:
  - Ronnie Thomas, American racing driver, in Christiansburg, Virginia
  - Steve James, American film producer, in Hampton, Virginia
- Died:
  - Princess Clémentine of Belgium, 82, wife of Victor, Prince Napoléon

== March 9, 1955 (Wednesday) ==
- Born:
  - R. Bruce Dold, American Journalist, in Newark, New Jersey (d. 2025)
  - Fernando Bujones, Cuban-American dancer, in Miami, Florida (d. 2005)
  - Franco Uncini, Italian motorcycle racer, in Recanati
  - Ornella Muti, Italian actress, in Rome
  - Teo Fabi, Italian racing driver, in Milan
- Died:
  - Matthew Henson, 88, American explorer, first African-American to reach the North Pole in 1909
  - Miroslava Stern, 29, Czech-Mexican actress, suicide by overdosage on sleeping pills

== March 10, 1955 (Thursday) ==
- The UK's Anti-Aircraft Command is officially disbanded after 15 years of operation.
- Born:
  - Bunny DeBarge, American musical artist, in Detroit, Michigan
  - Gary Louris, American musician, in Toledo, Ohio
  - Ignazio Marino, Italian politician and former transplant surgeon, 33rd Mayor of Rome 2013-2015, Member of the Senate 2006-2013, current Member of the European Parliament for Central Italy since 2024, in Genoa
  - Juliusz Machulski, Polish film director, screenwriter and producer, in Olsztyn, Poland
  - Richard Benson, English-Italian guitarist and singer, in Woking, Surrey (d. 2022)
  - Yousra, Egyptian actress and singer, in Cairo
- Died:
  - Brian Vrepont, 72, Australian poet
  - Johannes Brandt, 70, Austrian screenwriter and film director
  - William O'Dea, 66, Irish republican activist
  - Rick Adams, 76, American baseball player

== March 11, 1955 (Friday) ==
- Pakistan International Airlines (PIA) is formed after the merger of Orient Airways (1947-1955) by the Pakistani Government
- Born:
  - Joseph Siravo, American actor, in Washington, D.C. (d. 2021)
  - Jimmy Fortune, American musical artist, in Williamsburg, Virginia
  - Nina Hagen, German Singer, songwriter and actress, in East Berlin, East Germany
- Died:
  - Sir Alexander Fleming, 73, Scottish scientist, recipient of the Nobel Prize in Physiology or Medicine
  - Oscar F. Mayer, 95, German-American entrepreneur, founder of Oscar Mayer

== March 12, 1955 (Saturday) ==
- Died:
  - Charlie Parker, 34, American saxophonist (officially from lobar pneumonia and a perforated ulcer)
  - Theodor Plievier, 63, German writer

== March 13, 1955 (Sunday) ==
- 1955 Swiss tenant and consumer protection referendum: The proposal for a popular initiative "for the protection of tenants and consumers", which would prolong price controls, is approved by a majority of voters, it was rejected by a majority of cantons, with the result that it does not come into force.
- Born:
  - Bruno Conti, Italian footballer, in Nettuno
  - Glenne Headley, American actress, in New London, Connecticut (d. 2017)
  - John Hackett, English musical artist, in London
- Died:
  - Tribhuwan Bir Bikram Shah, 48, King of Nepal, under "mysterious circumstances". He is succeeded by his eldest legitimate son Mahendra.
  - Artashes Abeghyan, 77, Armenian historian

== March 14, 1955 (Monday) ==
- The Greek fishing vessel Iason capsizes and sinks in the Ionian Sea with the loss of eleven of her fifteen crew. SS Stratheden sends one of her lifeboats to the aid of Iason, but it also capsizes and all eight on board are drowned. Four survivors from Iason are rescued by Stratheden.
- Born: Jonathon Kaufer, American film director, in Los Angeles, California (d. 2013)
- Died: Ernest Cook, 89, English philanthropist and art collector, grandson of Thomas Cook

== March 15, 1955 (Tuesday) ==
- The first section of Cleveland's "Rapid" opens from Cleveland Union Terminal to Windermere.
- Colonel Tom Parker becomes Elvis Presley's de facto manager.
- Born:
  - Dee Snider, American heavy metal singer, in New York City
  - Moshin Khan, Pakistani cricket coach, former cricketer and actor, in Karachi, Dominion of Pakistan
  - Steve Lillywhite, English record producer, in Egham, Surrey
- Died:
  - Ernest Seillière, 89, French writer, journalist and critic

== March 16, 1955 (Wednesday) ==
- Died: Nicolas de Staël, 41, Russian-born French painter, after leaping to his death from his eleventh story studio terrace in Antibes.

== March 17, 1955 (Thursday) ==
- Richard Riot in Montreal: 6,000 people protest against the suspension of French Canadian ice hockey star Maurice Richard of the Montreal Canadiens by the National Hockey League following a violent incident during a match.
- In the UK's Wrexham by-election, brought about by the death of the town's long-serving Labour MP Robert Richards, is won by the Labour candidate James Idwal Jones, with a majority of nearly 11,000 votes.
- British Locomotive builder Vulcan Foundry and its subsidiary Robert Stephenson and Hawthorns are absorbed into the English Electric group.

== March 18, 1955 (Friday) ==
- Born: Jeff Stelling, English TV presenter in Hartlepool, County Durnham

== March 19, 1955 (Saturday) ==
- The 1955 International Cross Country Championships (men's event only) are held in San Sebastián, Spain.
- TV station KXTV signs on the air in Sacramento, California, as KBET.
- Born: Pino Daniele, Italian music artist, in Naples (d. 2015)

== March 20, 1955 (Sunday) ==
- The movie adaptation of Evan Hunter's novel Blackboard Jungle is premièred in the United States, making a hit out of "Rock Around the Clock" by Bill Haley & His Comets. Teenagers jump from their cinema seats to dance to the song.
- American Airlines Flight 711, a Convair CV-240, strikes the ground during its final approach at Springfield, Missouri, US killing 13 of the 35 people on board.
- UK tanker British Craftsman runs aground off Stockholm, Sweden.
- In Italy, the Republican Party retires its support to the Scelba cabinet, because contrasts about the farm lease act.
- Erich Kleiber resigns from director of the Berlin Staatsoper, as a protest for the interferences by the DDR bureaucracy and chiefly for the ungilding of an historical inscription placed by Frederick the Great.

== March 21, 1955 (Monday) ==
- The Lebanon president Camille Chamoun begins a four-day official visit in Italy; at the Ciampino airport he's welcomed by the Italian president Luigi Einaudi and by the Foreign Affairs Minister Gaetano Martino. March 25 Chamoun is received by Pope Pius XII.
- The Sovietic Foreign Affairs Minister Vjaceslav Molotov announces the constitution of a unified military command among USSR and the satellite countries (the future Warsaw Pact).
- In South Vietnam, the National Front (gathering the criminal-paramilitary organization Bimh-Xuyen and the religious sects Cao Dai and Hoa Hao) asks for a national union cabinet. The request is ignored by the Diem government.
- Born: Jair Bolsonaro, Brazilian politician, 38th President of Brazil 2019-2023, in São Paulo

== March 22, 1955 (Tuesday) ==
- Landing in darkness and heavy rain at Hickam Air Force Base, Territory of Hawaii, the crew of United States Navy Douglas R6D-1 Liftmaster 131612 of Air Transport Squadron 3 (VR-3) makes a navigational error, and the plane crashes into Pali Kea Peak in Oahu's Waianae Range 15 miles (24 km) northwest of Honolulu. The plane explodes, killing all 66 people on board. At the time, it would be the worst accident involving any version of the Douglas DC-6, and it remains the worst air disaster in the history of Hawaii. It would tie with the August 11 mid-air collision of two United States Air Force C-119G Flying Boxcars over West Germany and the October 6 crash of United Airlines Flight 409 in Wyoming as the deadliest air accident of 1955.
- In Morgnano (Spoleto), a firedamp deflagration in a lignite mine owned by the Terni Steel Mills causes the death of 23 workers; another 18 are gravely injured.

== March 23, 1955 (Wednesday) ==
- Norwegian ocean liner Venus runs aground at Plymouth, Devon, United Kingdom.
- Dutch coaster Anna Henny is driven ashore at Aberavon, Wales, in a storm. It is refloated after five hours.
- In Pozzuoli, the last knightly dispute in Italy happens. Gaetano Fiorentino, senator of the People's Monarchist Party, faces in a fencing duel the attorney Attilio Romano, acting in name of his client Carlo Delcroix, war invalid. Both the two contenders are slightly wounded. The dispute was caused by a Fiorentino's press article about Delcroix, judged injurious.
- Born: Moses Malone, American basketball player, in Petersburg, Virginia (d. 2015)
- Died: Artur Bernardes, 79, 12th President of Brazil 1922–26

== March 24, 1955 (Thursday) ==
- The West Germany President Theodor Heuss signs the Bonn-Paris conventions that authorize the rearmament of West Germany. In France, instead, the treaty causes heated debates; the Prime Minister Edgard Faure is forced to intervene in the Council of the Republic to solicit its ratification.
- The Italian Prime Minister Mario Scelba and the Foreign Affairs Minister Gaetano Martino begin a two weeks official travel in Canada and United States.
- At the Morosco Theatre in Broadway, premiere of Cat on a hot Tin Roof, by Tennessee Williams, directed by Elia Kazan, with Burl Ives, Ben Gazzara and Barbara Bel Geddes.
- Spanish cargo ship Urola collides with Soviet ship Storaya Pyaltylotka off Setubal, Portugal, and sinks. Storaya Pyaltylotka is badly damaged, entering the Tagus still taking on water. All 33 crew from Urola are rescued.
- An Avro Canada CF-100 Canuck becomes the first Canadian jet aircraft to fly across the Atlantic Ocean.
- Born: Vauro Senesi, cartoonist, in Pistoia.
- Died: John W. Davis, 81, American politician

== March 25, 1955 (Friday) ==
- After West Germany, East Germany also announces its rearmament.
- In Stockholm, the Soviet vice-minister of Foreign Affairs Andrei Gromyko meets the king of Sweden Gustav VI Adolf and the Prime Minister Tage Erlander.
- In Rome, premiere, in presence of the president Luigi Einaudi, of Marcello Baldi's Italia K2, the official documentary about the 1954 expedition to K2. The film gets a noticeable public success, with a 360 million liras collection in Italy.
- During a test flight with afterburner, the Lockheed XF-104 aircraft achieves a speed of Mach 1.79 (1,181.4 mph, 1,901.3 km/h).
- Dutch coaster SS Lea runs aground at Kettleness, Yorkshire.

== March 26, 1955 (Saturday) ==
- "March on Brussels", in the course of the Second School War. 100.000 Catholic militants fall on the Belgian capital; they mean to protest against the socialist Leo Collard, Minister of Public Education, who proposed a bill vised to cut the funding for the private schools. The manifestation, unauthorized by the city authorities, is severely repressed, with use of hydrants and charges by the mounted police. Despite the civil war atmosphere, by chance there are no victims.
- The number three propeller and engine detach from the Pan American World Airways Boeing 377 Stratocruiser 10-26 Clipper United States, operating as Flight 845/26 with 23 people on board, forcing it to ditch in the Pacific Ocean 35 miles (58 km) off the coast of Oregon and killing four people. The United States Navy attack transport USS Bayfield (APA-33) rescues the 19 survivors about two hours later.
- Slaughter of Colombaia di Secchia (Casina). Guerrino Costi, Communist militant and former partisan, fires two rifle shots from a window in the tavern where the victory of the Catholic list in the elections for the farmers' mutual funds is celebrated. Afro Rossi, local section DC secretary, and Giovanni Munarini, president of the Casina Azione Cattolica, are killed; two others are wounded.

== March 27, 1955 (Sunday) ==
- 1955 Tony Awards are held in the Plaza hotel, New York City, hosted by Frank Sinatra.
- In Paris, after a debate lasting the whole night, the French Council of the Republic probes the Bonn-Paris convention, the end of the military occupation in Germany and the agreement with West Germany for Saarland.
- Born: Mariano Rajoyj, Spanish Prime Minister, in Santiago de Compostela.

== March 28, 1955 (Monday) ==
- In Washington, the Italian Prime Minister Mario Scelba and the Foreign Affair Minister Gaetano Martino meet President Eisenhower, Secretary of State John Foster Dulles and the US ambassador in Italy Claire Booth Luce. Scelba declares Italian support for the projected Big Four summit.
- In France and North-Africa, lockout of the shops, proclaimed by Pierre Poujaude's UDCA as a protest against the taxman. The initiative is almost wholly symbolic, because most of the French shops are closed Monday for the weekly rest.
- In South Vietnam, the Battle of Saigon begins. Prime Minister Ngo Dinh Diem uses the army to seize the police prefecture, controlled by the Bình Xuyên.
- Serial killer Leslie "Mad Dog" Irvin ends his killing spree with the murders of Goebel Duncan, 51, his son Raymond Duncan, 29, and Maple Elizabeth Duncan, 20 (Goebel's daughter-in-law), during a robbery in southwestern Indiana, USA.
- The 1955 Men's British Open Squash Championship is won by Hashim Khan, who thus equals the record of five wins set by F.D. Amr Bey

== March 29, 1955 (Tuesday) ==
- A general election in Suriname results in victory for the Unity Front, which wins 11 of the 21 seats.
- Uprising of the National Front in Saigon: the Prime Minister's palace and the police prefecture are attacked with mortars. Eight ministers (included the Minister of Defence Ho Thong Minh) resigns from the Diem cabinet.
- At the elections for the FIAT internal commissions, success of CISL and outstanding failure of CGIL, that almost halve its votes (from 63.2 to 36.7%). Because the defeat, the social-communist trade union revises its strategy, leaving the most political claims.
- SNCF in France sets a new world rail speed record of 331 km/h using 1800/2000V DC electric traction. The track is severely damaged by the passage of the train (see , , , ).
- The British coaster Nigelock runs aground at Foochow, China.
- Born: Christopher Kennedy Lawford, actor, son of Peter Lawford and Patricia Kennedy (d. 2018)

== March 30, 1955 (Wednesday) ==
- The British Foreign Secretary Anthony Eden announces to the House of Commons that Great Britain adhered to the Baghdad Pact between Iraq and Turkey.
- In Saigon, the French High Commissioner for Indochina, General Paul Ely, secures a truce between the Army and the National Front; the fighting between the two parties, after having caused 26 victims in the capital, goes on in the country.
- 1955 Academy Awards: On the Waterfront wins 8 prizes, included best motion picture, best directing (Elia Kazan), best script (Budd Schilberg), best actor (Marlon Brando) and best actress in a supporting role (Eva Marie Saint). Grace Kelly is awarded as best actress for The Country Girl, Edmond O'Brien as best actor in a supporting role for The Barefoot Contessa; Teinosuke Kinugasa's Gate of Hell gets an honorary prize as best foreign film.
- Born: Paul Peters, production designer
- Died: Ylla, 43, Hungarian photographer (jeep accident)

== March 31, 1955 (Thursday) ==
- Australian Labor Party split of 1955: Three members of John Cain's cabinet – Les Coleman (Minister of Transport), Bill Barry (Minister of Health) and Tom Hayes (Minister-in-Charge of Housing) – are expelled from the Labor Party and form the Australian Labor Party (Anti-Communist).
- In Turin, the 22nd congress of the Italian Socialist Party begins; in his inaugural report, the Secretary Pietro Nenni confirms the alliance with the communists, but makes some openings to the Christian Democracy and accepts NATO as a "purely defensive alliance". The congress ends April 3, with the re-election of Nenni and Rodolfo Morandi as secretary and vice-secretary.
- Born:
  - Marcello Sorgi, Italian journalist, in Palermo.
  - Jacopo Fo, Italian writer and far-left militant, son of Dario Fo and Franca Rame, in Rome.
  - Lele Mora, controversial Italian show-business agent, in Bagnolo di Po.
