= Israel Njemanze =

- Born: December 25, 1922; Amaawom, Owerri, Imo State, Nigeria
- Died: April 8, 1955 (aged 32); Lagos

Israel Njemanze (25 December 1922 – 8 April 1955), also called Nwoba, was a Nigerian vocalist and musician who was a member of musical group Three Night Wizards.

He was born in Amaawom, Owerri, Imo State into the Njemanze royal family. Njemanze was a highlife singer and known for the dynamism of his lyrics which were packed with wit and humour.

Njemanze was murdered following a dispute with fellow bandmembers.

== Murder ==
Njemanze was murdered on April 7 or 8, 1955, on the eve of Good Friday. His body was severed and found near the railway tracks in Surulere area of Lagos.

A day earlier, Njemanze and members of the Three Night Wizard held a meeting at the residence of the band's treasurer, Samuel Jegede in Idi-Oro, Mushin. The Mushin meeting was conveyed to settle a dispute within the band. Njemenze had earlier told his bandmates he wanted to quit the band which had caused the discontent. When the meeting ended the dispute was not settled and Njemanze returned home. On the evening of April 7, Njemanze went to a relative's resident in Surulere, he was soon asked by a man to come and sing that night. When Njemenze reached the client's residence, the man excused himself and never returned. He left the residence around 1:30 a.m. and that was the last time he was seen alive. The next day, his mutilated body was found around a rail track. The autopsy showed that he died of two inflicted wounds and his body was dismembered after his death.

Eight people including the band's treasurer, Samuel Jegede were charged for his murder and the jury found six of the accused guilty.

== Sources ==
- Oti, Sonny (2009). Highlife Music In West Africa. African Books Collective. ISBN 9789788422082.
