= AL 15 =

AL 15 may refer to:

- U.S. Route 29 in Alabama (internally designated by the Alabama Department of Transportation as State Route 15)
- Jack Edwards Airport (former FAA LID code: AL15) serving Gulfport, Alabama, US
