= Springfield–Branson National Airport =

Coordinates: 37°14′44″N 093°23′19″W

- IATA: SGF; ICAO: KSGF; FAA LID: SGF

Summary
- Airport type: Public
- Owner: City of Springfield
- Operator: Springfield Airport Board
- Serves: Springfield / Branson, Missouri
- Opened: July 2, 1945 (81 years ago)
- Elevation AMSL: 1,268 ft (386 m)
- Website: flyspringfield.com

Maps
- FAA airport diagram
- Interactive map of Springfield–Branson National Airport

Runways
Direction	Length		Surface
Direction	ft	m	Surface
14/32	8,000	2,438	Concrete
2/20	7,003	2,135	Concrete

Statistics (2025)
- Passengers: 1,554,687
- Aircraft operations: 72,167
- Sources: FAA, airport website

Springfield–Branson National Airport (IATA: SGF, ICAO: KSGF, FAA LID: SGF) (formerly Springfield–Greene County Airport, Springfield Municipal Airport, and Springfield–Branson Regional Airport) is five miles (8.0 km) northwest of the city center of Springfield, in Greene County, Missouri, United States. The airport hosts non-stop flights to 13 cities in the U.S., 1 of which is seasonal.

== History ==
In 1925, McCluer Flying Field (now Downtown Airport) was opened as a private airport on East Division Street. It was purchased by the city in 1928 and renamed to Springfield Park and Airport. The following year, commercial air service from American Airlines, Transcontinental and Western, and other carriers began to be offered at the airport.

Over the next two decades, as planes continued to increase in size, the short and unpaved runways of the Springfield Airport made it difficult for commercial air service to expand. Furthermore, the Great Depression left little funding for improvement, and commercial air service eventually disappeared.

During World War II, wounded returning soldiers were being flown in large numbers to Springfield on their way to the O'Reilly General Hospital, and it became evident that the airport was ill-equipped for air traffic and was in dire need of an upgrade.

On September 1, 1942, Lester E. Cox addressed city council with a proposal for a $350,000 bond issue to build a new airport. The following month, municipal voters approved the bond issue, for which work began in 1944. Springfield had purchased 840 acres northwest of the city for $125,000. Further bonds in the amount of $150,000 to complete the project were approved in 1945, and on July 2 of that year the new Airport opened for business. While originally known as the Springfield-Greene County Airport, disagreements between the city and county governments about finances caused the City of Springfield to assume full control, renaming it the Springfield Municipal Airport. Soon after, in early 1946, American Airlines again began commercial service to SGF.

In 1960, Springfield voters approved a $600,000 bond issue to build a new terminal, which opened in October 1964. This terminal was expanded multiple times in the following decades as passenger numbers grew at an accelerating rate.

The airport was eventually renamed the Springfield-Branson National Airport. It is likely that this was in order to capitalise on the tourist industry of the nearby city of Branson, Missouri. Despite this, the city of Branson is not involved in any way with the operation or funding of the airport.

In 2005, the airport saw a year-over-year passenger increase of 23 percent, its largest in history. Due to this, ground was broken for yet another new terminal in May 2006. The new Midfield Terminal was opened in May 2009. In the same month, the airport celebrated its first scheduled service to the west coast, an Allegiant Air service to Los Angeles. The new terminal was eventually renamed the Roy Blunt Terminal in honor of Missouri Senator Roy Blunt.

The airport served 1 million passengers for the first time in 2018.

== Accidents and incidents ==
- At 10:36 pm on March 20, 1955, American Airlines Flight 711 crashed more than a mile north of the airport. Eleven of 32 passengers died, along with the stewardess and copilot. The federal investigation blamed pilot error misjudging the altitude. It is the only fatal accident on airport property.

== Facilities ==
The airport covers 2,750 acres (1,110 ha) and has two runways: 14/32, asphalt/concrete, 8,000 ft × 150 ft (2,438 m × 46 m); and 2/20, concrete, 7,003 ft × 150 ft (2,135 m × 46 m).

An Army National Guard unit is based at Springfield–Branson, the 35th combat aviation brigade, detachment 3 company 1 of the 185th aviation regiment. "The 35th Combat Aviation Brigade deploys to an area of responsibility to provide command, control, staff planning and supervision of combat aviation brigade operations. The brigade's units fly a combination of AH-64A Apache attack helicopters, OH-58 Kiowa observation helicopters and UH-60 Blackhawk utility helicopters. It also has a detachment of two C-23 Sherpa cargo airplanes and a C-12 transport airplane."

== Financial data ==
The strongest area of income for SGF is from non-aeronautical revenue activities including parking and rental cars. This is followed by fuel sales, terminal fees and landing fees. Parking income has been the strongest for the past year and has followed enplanement trends with a drop in revenues in FY 2008, and increasing again in FY 2010, with the highest level to date at more than $2.5 million.

Personnel is the largest expenditure for the airport: this major operating expense is increasing per year and remains the highest by a very large margin. Additionally, an expense that sticks out is a sharp increase in contractual series between FY 2011 and FY 2012.

Fiscal year	Total revenues	Total expenses	Net income	Capital expenditures
2008	$12,008,097	6,703,666	5,304,431	Not Reported
2009	10,708,239	7,239,789	3,468,450	57,788,829
2010	10,876,318	8,290,949	2,585,369	15,539,739
2011	11,529,077	8,726,064	2,803,013	7,596,060
2012	11,668,484	9,256,135	2,412,349	9,725,630

== Airlines and destinations ==
=== Passenger ===
Airlines	Destinations
Allegiant Air	Gulf Shores, Las Vegas, Orlando/Sanford, Phoenix/Mesa, Punta Gorda (FL), St. Petersburg/Clearwater; Seasonal: Destin/Fort Walton Beach
American Eagle	Charlotte, Chicago–O'Hare, Dallas/Fort Worth; Seasonal: Miami Phoenix–Sky Harbor
Delta Air Lines	Atlanta
United Express	Chicago–O'Hare, Denver, Houston–Intercontinental

Passenger destinations map
Domestic destinations from Springfield–Branson National Airport
Red = Year-round destination
Green = Seasonal destination
Blue = Future destination

== Statistics ==
=== Top destinations ===
Ten busiest domestic routes out of SGF (January 2025 – December 2025)
Rank	City	Passengers	Carriers
1	Dallas/Fort Worth, Texas	198,780	American
2	Chicago–O'Hare, Illinois	117,760	American, United
3	Atlanta, Georgia	89,330	Delta
4	Charlotte, North Carolina	81,990	American
5	Denver, Colorado	81,970	United
6	Houston–Intercontinental, Texas	49,470	United
7	Phoenix–Mesa, Arizona	32,200	Allegiant
8	St. Petersburg/Clearwater, Florida	28,660	Allegiant
9	Orlando–Sanford, Florida	26,650	Allegiant
10	Las Vegas, Nevada	17,550	Allegiant

=== Annual traffic ===
Year	Passengers	Percent change
2000	710,961	▲ --%
2001	653,568	▼8.7%
2002	652,283	▼0.1%
2003	653,253	▲0.1%
2004	721,958	▲10.5%
2005	888,738	▲23.1%
2006	864,999	▼2.6%
2007	883,893	▲2.1%
2008	779,995	▼11.7%
2009	811,771	▲4.0%
2010	796,251	▼1.9%
2011	731,396	▼8.1%
2012	740,000	▲1.1%
2013	755,773	▲2.1%
2014	846,324	▲12.0%
2015	919,004	▲8.5%
2016	952,703	▲3.6%
2017	993,129	▲4.2%
2018	1,075,425	▲8.3%
2019	1,187,068	▲10.4%
2020	598,604	▼49.6%
2021	968,227	▲62.7%
2022	1,109,529	▲14.6%
2023	1,292,007	▲16.4%
2024	1,426,922	▲10.4%
2025	1,554,687	▲9.0%

== See also ==
- List of airports in Missouri
