= May 1955 =

Month of 1955

<<	May 1955					>>
Su	Mo	Tu	We	Th	Fr	Sa
1	2	3	4	5	6	7
8	9	10	11	12	13	14
15	16	17	18	19	20	21
22	23	24	25	26	27	28
29	30	31

The following events occurred in May 1955:

== May 1, 1955 (Sunday) ==
- The First Taiwan Strait Crisis came to an end, as the People's Liberation Army of China temporarily ceased shelling Kinmen and Matsu.
- The 1955 Grand Prix motorcycle racing season opened with the Spanish motorcycle Grand Prix, with Luigi Taveri winning the 125cc event and Reg Armstrong winning the 500cc.

== May 2, 1955 (Monday) ==
- In the UK, the Delph Donkey passenger train service was withdrawn from stations between Oldham and Delph.
- Born: Ed Murray, American politician and 53rd mayor of Seattle

== May 3, 1955 (Tuesday) ==
- Born: David Hookes, Australian cricketer; in Mile End, Adelaide (died 2004)

== May 4, 1955 (Wednesday) ==
- Born: Ammar Belhimer, Algerian law educator and journalist; in El Aouana, Jijel Province, Algeria
- Died: George Enescu, 73, Romanian composer

== May 5, 1955 (Thursday) ==
- West Germany became a sovereign country recognized by important Western countries, such as France, the United Kingdom, Canada, and the United States.

== May 6, 1955 (Friday) ==
- The Western European Union charter came into effect.
- The Burmese ship SS Pyidawtha ran aground and was wrecked in the Bay of Bengal, off Cheduba Island.
- Born: Tom Bergeron, American television personality and game show host; in Haverhill, Massachusetts

== May 7, 1955 (Saturday) ==
- Born: Mayra Alejandra, Venezuelan actress; in Caracas (died 2014)

== May 8, 1955 (Sunday) ==
- Born: Meles Zenawi, Prime Minister of Ethiopia; in Adwa (died 2012)

== May 9, 1955 (Monday) ==
- West Germany joined the North Atlantic Treaty Organization (NATO).
- Jim Henson introduced the earliest version of Kermit (not yet referred to as a frog) in the premiere of his puppet show Sam and Friends on WRC-TV in Washington, D.C.

== May 10, 1955 (Tuesday) ==
- United States Air Force 8th Tactical Fighter Wing pilot James E. McInerney Jr. shot down a MiG-15 (NATO reporting name "Fagot") fighter flown by a People's Republic of China pilot over Korea. It was the last MiG-15 shot down by United Nations forces in Korea.
- Born: Mark David Chapman, American murderer of musician John Lennon; in Fort Worth, Texas
- Died:
  - Tommy Burns, 73, Canadian boxer
  - John Radecki, 89, Polish-born Australian stained-glass artist

== May 11, 1955 (Wednesday) ==
- Japanese National Railways' ferry Shiun Maru sank after a collision with sister ship Uko Maru in thick fog off Takamatsu, Shikoku, in the Seto Inland Sea of Japan; 166 passengers (many children) and two crew were killed. This event would be influential in plans to construct the Akashi Kaikyō Bridge (built 1986–98).
- A shack in the Polish village of Wielopole Skrzyńskie, Subcarpathian Voivodeship, housing a movie projection burned down, killing 58 people, 48 of whom were children.
- Died: Gilbert Jessop, 80, English cricketer

== May 12, 1955 (Thursday) ==
- Local elections were held in the UK cities of Leeds and Liverpool.
- New York's Third Avenue Elevated ran its last train between Chatham Square in Manhattan and East 149th Street in the Bronx, thus ending elevated train service in Manhattan.

== May 13, 1955 (Friday) ==
- A riot took place at an Elvis Presley concert in Jacksonville, Florida, USA.

== May 14, 1955 (Saturday) ==
- Eight Communist Bloc countries, including the Soviet Union, signed a mutual defence treaty in Warsaw, Poland, that was called the Warsaw Pact. It would be dissolved in 1991.
- Died:
  - Charles Pelot Summerall, 88, US general
  - Anwar Wagdi, 50, Egyptian actor and filmmaker, died of polycystic kidney disease.

== May 15, 1955 (Sunday) ==
- Lionel Terray and Jean Couzy became the first people to summit Makalu, the fifth-highest mountain in the world, on the 1955 French Makalu expedition. The entire team of climbers would reach the summit over the next two days.
- The Austrian State Treaty, which restored Austria's national sovereignty, was concluded between the four occupying powers following World War II (the United Kingdom, the United States, the Soviet Union, and France) and Austria, setting it up as a neutral country.
- Lufthansa began its international service, with flights between West Germany and London, Paris, and Madrid.

== May 16, 1955 (Monday) ==
- Died: James Agee, 45, US writer, died of a heart attack.

== May 17, 1955 (Tuesday) ==
- The Clark Art Institute opened to the public in Williamstown, Massachusetts, USA.
- Born: Bill Paxton, American actor; in Fort Worth, Texas (d. 2017)

== May 18, 1955 (Wednesday) ==
- Free movement of residents between North and South Vietnam ended.
- Dutch coaster Urmajo ran aground on the Goodwin Sands, Kent, United Kingdom. All ten crew were rescued by the Ramsgate lifeboat. They would later be returned to the ship, which refloated on the next tide. Urmajo was towed into Ramsgate by the tug Ocean Cock.
- Died: Mary McLeod Bethune, 79, US educator

== May 19, 1955 (Thursday) ==
- The Black Sash women's movement was founded in South Africa by Jean Sinclair, Ruth Foley, Elizabeth McLaren, Tertia Pybus, Jean Bosazza, and Helen Newton-Thompson.

== May 20, 1955 (Friday) ==
- Born: Zbigniew Preisner, Polish film score composer; in Bielsko-Biała

== May 21, 1955 (Saturday) ==
- The final of the DFB-Pokal football tournament was held between Karlsruher SC and Schalke 04, with Karlsruher SC winning 3–2.
- Chuck Berry recorded his first-ever song, "Maybellene".
- Herman Schultheis, Disney animator and amateur photographer, disappeared near Petén while on a trip to the Mayan temples at Tikal in Guatemala. His body would be found 18 months later.

== May 22, 1955 (Sunday) ==
- Born: Chalmers "Spanky" Alford, US jazz guitarist; in Philadelphia, Pennsylvania (died 2008)

== May 23, 1955 (Monday) ==
- Future Archbishop James Scanlan became Roman Catholic Bishop of Motherwell, Scotland.

== May 24, 1955 (Tuesday) ==
- The French Open tennis tournament opened at Stade Roland-Garros in Paris.

== May 25, 1955 (Wednesday) ==
- Joe Brown and George Band were the first to complete a climb of Kangchenjunga in the Himalayas, as part of the British Kangchenjunga expedition led by Charles Evans. They respected local spiritual feelings by not setting foot on the actual summit.
- A devastating tornado outbreak hit the Midwestern United States, producing the deadliest tornado in Kansas history, an F5 that struck Udall, Kansas. It also produced another F5 tornado that hit Blackwell, Oklahoma.

== May 26, 1955 (Thursday) ==
- The 1955 United Kingdom general election was held.

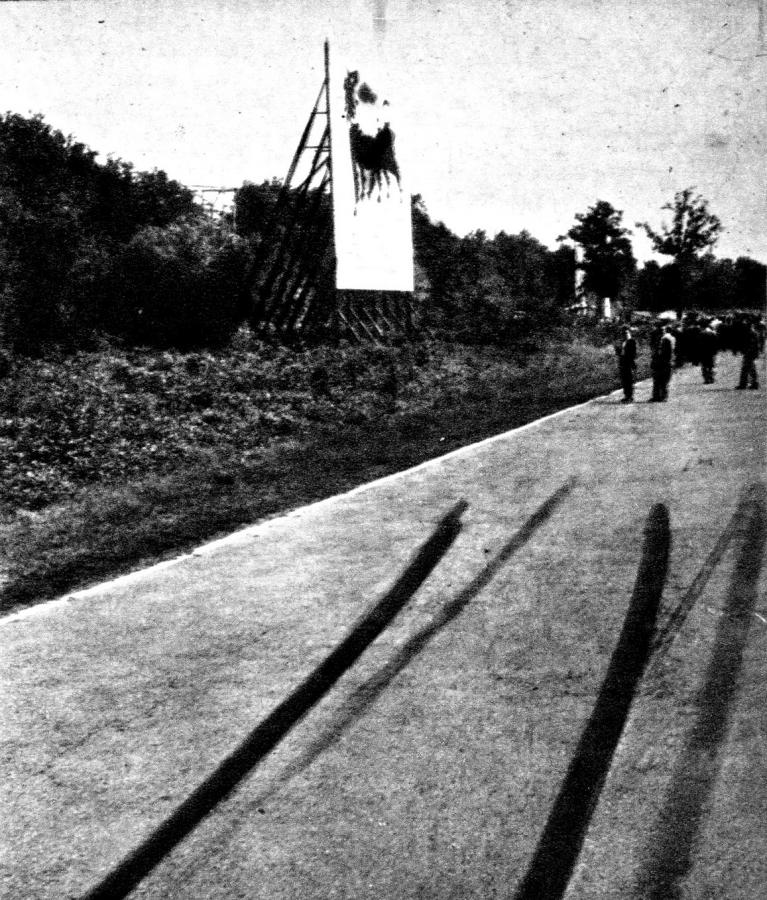
Curve where Alberto Ascari was killed

- Died: Alberto Ascari, 36, Italian racecar driver, died in a racing accident at Monza Circuit.

== May 27, 1955 (Friday) ==
- The official Flag of Minneapolis was adopted.

== May 28, 1955 (Saturday) ==
- A state election was held in Victoria, Australia. John Cain's Labor government was defeated by the Liberal and Country Party, led by Henry Bolte.
- The Associated Society of Locomotive Engineers and Firemen in the UK called a strike which would continue until June 14, leading to a State of emergency being declared on May 31.

== May 29, 1955 (Sunday) ==
- The Norfolk and Western Railway in the United States began its conversion to diesel locomotive power from a purely steam locomotive roster with the purchase of eight ALCO RS-3s.
- Born:
  - Mike Porcaro, US bass guitarist; in South Windsor, Connecticut (died 2015)
  - John Hinckley Jr., American attempted assassin of Ronald Reagan; in Ardmore, Oklahoma

== May 30, 1955 (Monday) ==
- The UK minesweeper HMS Northumbria of the Royal Naval Volunteer Reserve was in a collision with the Cypriot ship MV Cyprian Prince off Newcastle upon Tyne and was holed. Cyprian Prince towed her into Newcastle upon Tyne.
- The UK collier ship Harfry collided with another British ship, MV Firmity, off Great Yarmouth, Norfolk. Both ships were holed. Harfry was beached at Hemsby and Firmity put into Great Yarmouth.
- Born: Jake "the Snake" Roberts, American professional wrestler; in Houston, Texas
- Died: Bill Vukovich, 36, US racecar driver, was killed in a chain-reaction crash while holding a 17-second lead on the 57th lap of the 1955 Indianapolis 500.

== May 31, 1955 (Tuesday) ==
- As tensions in the Formosa Strait eased, the People's Republic of China released four captured American fliers. It would release all other captured Americans over the summer.
