= 1956 Atlantic R6D-1 disappearance =

Aircraft disappearance

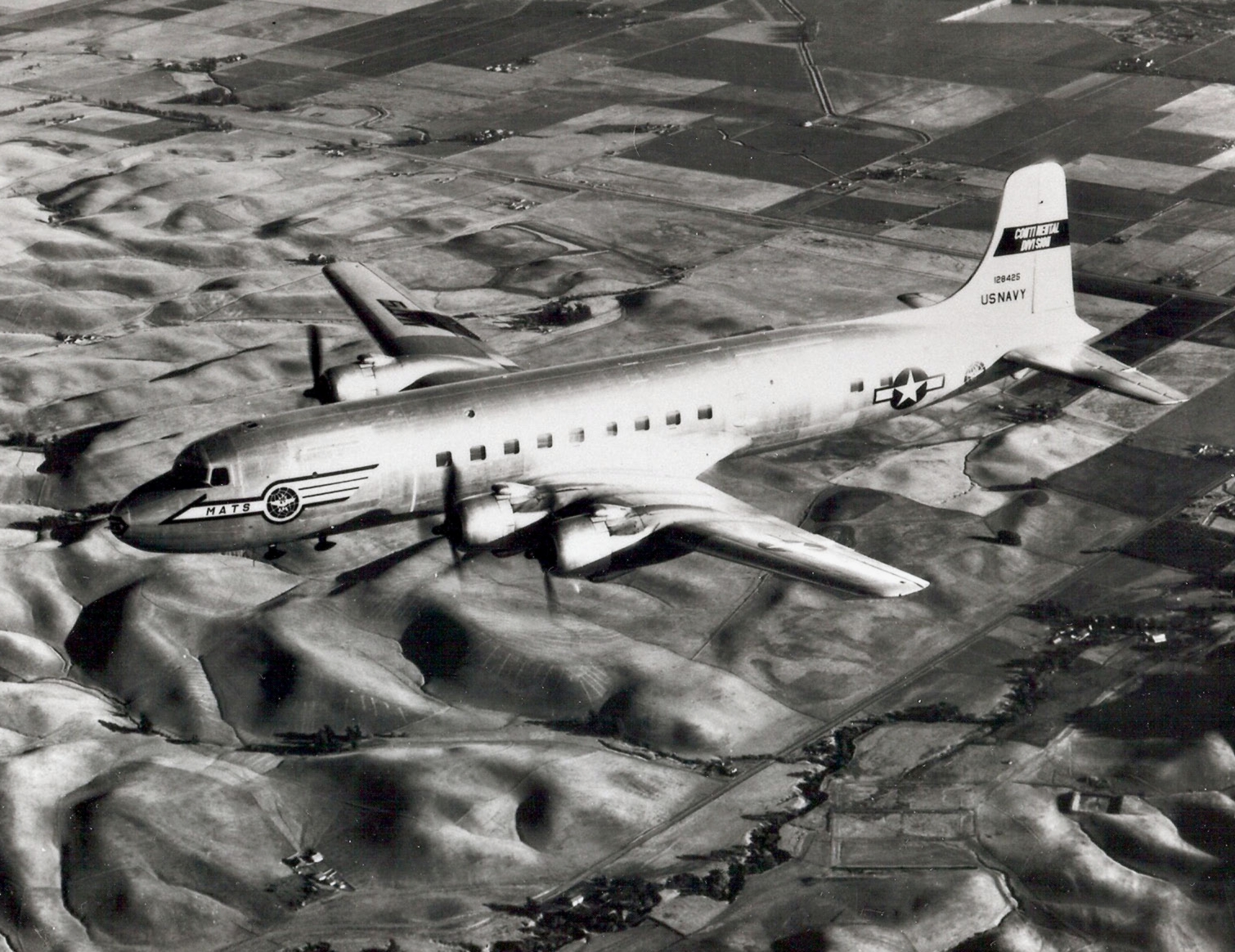
- A U.S. Navy R6D-1 Liftmaster, similar to the accident aircraft, operating for the Military Air Transport Service in the 1950s.

Accident
- Date: October 10, 1956
- Summary: Undetermind
- Site: Atlantic Ocean, 590 km (368.8 miles) southwest of Land's End, United Kingdom

Aircraft
- Aircraft type: Douglas R6D-1 Liftmaster
- Operator: United States Navy, Military Air Transport Service (MATS)
- Registration: BuNo 131588
- Flight origin: RAF Lakenheath, England
- Destination: Lajes Field, Azores
- Passengers: 50
- Crew: 9
- Fatalities: 59
- Survivors: 0

The 1956 Atlantic R6D-1 disappearance involved a Douglas R6D-1 Liftmaster (BuNo 131588) of the United States Navy which disappeared over the Atlantic Ocean on 10 October 1956 with the loss of all 59 people on board.

== Accident ==
The R6D-1 – the U.S. Navy version of the United States Air Force C-118 Liftmaster and the civilian Douglas DC-6B airliner – was carrying a crew of nine and 50 passengers on a scheduled Military Air Transport Service flight from RAF Lakenheath, England, to Lajes Field in the Azores on 10 October 1956 when it disappeared over the Atlantic Ocean about 590 kilometers (370 mi; 320 nmi) southwest of Land's End, England, at approximately 22:10.

All of the passengers were personnel of the U.S. Air Force's 307th Bombardment Wing stationed at Lincoln Air Force Base, Nebraska, returning to the United States from 90 days of temporary duty in England. The disappearance was the second major accident involving a Navy R6D-1 in 19 months, an R6D-1 having crashed in Hawaii in March 1955.

A 14-day search for the aircraft and survivors found only wheels and a life raft floating 596 kilometers (370 mi; 322 nmi) southwest of Land's End. No trace of the crew or passengers was ever found.

== See also ==
- List of accidents and incidents involving military aircraft (1955–1959)
- 1951 Atlantic C-124 disappearance
- 1955 Hawaii R6D-1 crash
