= June 1955 =

Month of 1955

<<	June 1955					>>
Su	Mo	Tu	We	Th	Fr	Sa
			1	2	3	4
5	6	7	8	9	10	11
12	13	14	15	16	17	18
19	20	21	22	23	24	25
26	27	28	29	30

The following events occurred in June 1955:

== June 1, 1955 (Wednesday) ==
- Marilyn Monroe (on her 29th birthday) and her husband Joe DiMaggio attend the première of Billy Wilder's film of The Seven Year Itch, featuring an iconic scene in which Monroe stands on a New York City Subway grating as her white dress is blown above her knees.

== June 2, 1955 (Thursday) ==
- Italian singers Natalino Otto and Flo Sandon's marry.
- The Baikonur Cosmodrome is founded.

== June 3, 1955 (Friday) ==
- The Messina Conference, a conference of the foreign ministers of the six member states of the European Coal and Steel Community (ECSC), concludes in Messina, Sicily. René Mayer is appointed as President of the High Authority.

== June 4, 1955 (Saturday) ==
- Giuseppe Alessi begins his second term as President of Sicily.

== June 5, 1955 (Sunday) ==
- The 1955 Belgian Grand Prix takes place at Circuit de Spa-Francorchamps and is won by Juan Manuel Fangio.
- Died:
  - Pattillo Higgins, 91, US oil pioneer and businessman
  - Sir Herbert Stanley, 82, British administrator, former Governor of Northern Rhodesia, Ceylon and Southern Rhodesia

== June 6, 1955 (Monday) ==
- Born: Sam Simon, US filmmaker, in Los Angeles (d. 2015)

== June 7, 1955 (Tuesday) ==
- In Australia, the state of Victoria's Interim Bolte Ministry is sworn in.
- The television quiz program The $64,000 Question premieres on CBS-TV in the United States, with Hal March as the host.
- Born:
  - Bob Beatty, American football coach, in Butler, Missouri
  - Tim Richmond, US race car driver, in Ashland, Ohio (d. 1989)

== June 8, 1955 (Wednesday) ==
- British ferry Mona's Isle collides with a fishing vessel and runs aground at Fleetwood, Lancashire, UK. The fishing vessel is cut in two and sinks with the loss of one of her three crew. Mona's Isle is later refloated.
- Born: Tim Berners-Lee, English computer scientist and inventor, in London

== June 9, 1955 (Thursday) ==
- The England cricket team defeats South Africa in Nottingham.

== June 10, 1955 (Friday) ==
- Browne–Fitzpatrick privilege case, 1955: In an unprecedented legal case, journalist Frank Browne and businessman Raymond Edward Fitzpatrick are called before the Parliament of Australia to answer charges relating to a newspaper article.
- Born: Mohammad Sabah Al-Salem Al-Sabah, Kuwaiti politician, in Kuwait City.

== June 11, 1955 (Saturday) ==
- Le Mans disaster: Eighty-three people are killed and at least 100 are injured after two race cars collide in the 1955 24 Hours of Le Mans.
- Died:
  - Walter Hampden, 75, US actor
  - Pierre Levegh, 49, French racing driver, killed in the Le Mans disaster

== June 12, 1955 (Sunday) ==
- After the Mercedes team is ordered home, the 1955 24 Hours of Le Mans concludes and is won by Mike Hawthorn and Ivor Bueb in a Jaguar.

== June 13, 1955 (Monday) ==
- Mir mine, the first diamond mine in the Soviet Union, is discovered by geologists Yuri Khabardin, Ekaterina Elagina and Viktor Avdeenko during the large Amakinsky Expedition in Yakut ASSR.

== June 14, 1955 (Tuesday) ==
- Cyril Restieaux is consecrated Roman Catholic Bishop of Portsmouth (UK) by Archbishop Francis Joseph Grimshaw of Birmingham, Archbishop John Aloysius Murphy of Cardiff and Bishop Joseph Rudderham of Clifton.
- Born: Paul O'Grady, British broadcaster, actor and former drag queen (Lily Savage) in Tranmere, Merseyside (d. 2023)

== June 15, 1955 (Wednesday) ==
- The World track cycling record for the women's flying 200m time trial is set by Daisy Franks of the UK in a meeting at Herne Hill.

== June 16, 1955 (Thursday) ==
- Bombing of Plaza de Mayo: As part of an attempted coup against President Juan Perón, Argentine Naval Aviation and Argentine Air Force aircraft bomb and strafe the Casa Rosada in Buenos Aires and the adjacent Plaza de Mayo while a large crowd is gathered there to express support for Perón; the attack kills 364 people and injures more than 800. It is the largest aerial bombing ever to take place in mainland Argentina.
- Lady and the Tramp, the Walt Disney company's 15th animated film, is premiered in Chicago, the first animated feature filmed in the CinemaScope widescreen process. Peggy Lee co-writes and sings the songs.
- Pianist Glenn Gould completes his recording of Bach's Goldberg Variations.

== June 17, 1955 (Friday) ==
- Died: Carlyle Blackwell, 71, US actor (b. 1884)

== June 18, 1955 (Saturday) ==
- The narrow gauge Disneyland Railroad in Anaheim, California, makes its first run as an attraction at the new Disneyland theme park.
- Born: Sandy Allen, US woman destined to be the world's tallest woman, in Chicago (died 2008)

== June 19, 1955 (Sunday) ==
- British Navy vessel HMS Sidon sinks following the onboard explosion of a torpedo. Thirteen lives are lost.
- Died: Adrienne Monnier, 63, French Modernist writer and publisher

== June 20, 1955 (Monday) ==
- A total solar eclipse of 7 min 8 sec duration, the longest between the 11th and 22nd centuries, is visible in Southeast Asia. During the entire Second Millennium, only seven such eclipses exceed seven minutes of totality.

== June 21, 1955 (Tuesday) ==
- Born: Michel Platini, French footballer, in Jœuf

== June 22, 1955 (Wednesday) ==
- Soviet armed forces shoot down a U.S. Navy patrol plane of VP-9 over the Bering Strait. The Soviet Union surprises the United States by paying half the damages and issuing a statement of regret even though the American plane clearly had violated Soviet airspace.
- While approaching USS Oriskany (CV-34) for a night landing in the Sea of Japan, U.S. naval aviator John R. C. Mitchell's McDonnell F2H Banshee crashes into the ship's fantail. The rear half of the airplane falls into the ocean in flames, but Mitchell sustains only minor injuries. Five sailors sleeping on the fantail are injured. The incident will be immortalized in The Right Stuff by Tom Wolfe, which refers to Mitchell by the alias of "accident-prone Mitch Johnson".
- The Disney animated film Lady and the Tramp is released.

== June 23, 1955 (Thursday) ==
- Charles-Henri Bonfils replaces Jean Paul Parisot as Colonial Governor of French Guinea.

== June 24, 1955 (Friday) ==
- The East Preston tram depot opens in Melbourne, Australia, replacing the old Preston depot (also referred to as Thornbury depot). Its opening coincides with the reintroduction of tram services to Bourke Street; the former Bourke Street cable lines, Melbourne's last, had been converted to bus operations on 26 October 1940.

== June 25, 1955 (Saturday) ==
- The prototype of the Oberlerchner Mg 23 aircraft makes its first flight, resulting in an improved design.

== June 26, 1955 (Sunday) ==
- The Freedom Charter of the anti-apartheid South African Congress Alliance is adopted at a Congress of the People in Kliptown.
- Born: Mick Jones, English musician, in Wandsworth, London
- Died: Engelbert Zaschka, German helicopter pioneer (b. 1895)

== June 27, 1955 (Monday) ==
- Sculptor Sir Jacob Epstein marries his former model Kathleen Garman, the mother of three of his children.

== June 28, 1955 (Tuesday) ==
- Jean Moire lands a Bell 47 helicopter on top of Mont Blanc, at an altitude of 4,807 m (15,772 ft).

== June 29, 1955 (Wednesday) ==
- The Sixth government of Israel is formed by Moshe Sharett during the second Knesset.

== June 30, 1955 (Thursday) ==
- The Simonstown Agreement provides for control of the naval base at Simon's Town in the Union of South Africa to transfer from the British Royal Navy to the South African Navy.
- A Gloster Meteor jet fighter crashes on takeoff from RAF West Malling in Kent, UK, killing both crew and two fruit-pickers on the ground. On the same day, two Hawker Sea Hawk jet fighters flying from RNAS Lossiemouth in Scotland independently crash into the North Sea; one pilot is killed.
