= April 1955 =

Month of 1955

<<	April 1955					>>
Su	Mo	Tu	We	Th	Fr	Sa
					1	2
3	4	5	6	7	8	9
10	11	12	13	14	15	16
17	18	19	20	21	22	23
24	25	26	27	28	29	30

The following events occurred in April 1955:

== April 1, 1955 (Friday) ==
- Bomb attacks against British installations continue (from March 29) as EOKA starts an independence campaign against British rule in the Crown colony of Cyprus.
- Post-World War II bans on powered flight in West Germany are lifted and Lufthansa begins operations, providing service linking Hamburg, Düsseldorf, Frankfurt-am-Main, Cologne, and Munich. The airline acquired the name and logo of the defunct airline Deutsche Luft Hansa in August 1954 and considers it part of its own history but has no legal connection with the earlier airline.
- In South Vietnam, the Cao Dai sects breaks with the National Front and puts its army at the disposal of the Diem cabinet.
- In the Mindanao Island, a series of earthquakes with epicenter near the Lake Lanao, cause 225 victims and destroys 2997 houses.
- Born: Terry Nichols, American domestic terrorist who was a co-conspirator in the Oklahoma City bombing, in Lapeer, Michigan

== April 2, 1955 (Saturday) ==
- A general election is held in Singapore, the Labour Front gains the most seats and a working majority; its chairman, David Marshall, becomes Singapore's first Chief Minister.
- Duncan Edwards, the 18-year-old Manchester United left-half, becomes the youngest full England international in a 7–2 win over Scotland at Wembley. Dudley-born Edwards is already being tipped by many observers to become the next England captain upon the eventual retirement of Billy Wright.
- In Yvoy-le-Marron, Olivia De Havilland marries the French journalist Pierre Galante. The French writers Marcel Pagnol and Marcel Achard are present at the ceremony.
- Ahmad bin Yahya, Iman of Yemen, is deposed by a military coup d'état in favor of his brother Abdullah, the Foreign Minister, and held as a prisoner in his palace. Three days later, a force led by the Crown Prince Muhammad al-Badr frees the Iman and puts back him on the throne.

== April 3, 1955 (Sunday) ==
- A passenger train plunges into a canyon in Guadalajara, Mexico; 300 people are killed.
- Maryan Wisniewski makes his international debut, becoming the youngest footballer to play for France, at the age of 18 years and 2 months

== April 4, 1955 (Monday) ==
- The United Airlines Douglas DC-6 Mainliner Idaho crashes shortly after taking off from Long Island MacArthur Airport in Ronkonkoma, Islip, New York, on an instrument rating check flight due to an inadvertent reversal of the pitch of the propeller on the number 4 engine. The plane is carrying no passengers; all three crew members on board die.

== April 5, 1955 (Tuesday) ==
- Winston Churchill resigns as Prime Minister of the United Kingdom at the age of 80, after suffering several strokes.
- Richard J. Daley defeats Robert Merrian by 708,222 votes to 581,555 to become Mayor of the US city of Chicago.
- Moonraker, the third James Bond novel, is published by Jonathan Cape.
- Born: Janice Long, British radio presenter in Liverpool, England (d. 2021)

== April 6, 1955 (Wednesday) ==
- Foreign Secretary Anthony Eden becomes Prime Minister of the United Kingdom.

== April 7, 1955 (Thursday) ==
- Radio Tokyo TV (now Tokyo Broadcasting System Television (TBS)) begins broadcasting in Japan.
- Born: Werner Stocker, German actor, in Flintsbach am Inn (d. 1993)
- Died: Theda Bara, 69, US film actress (stomach cancer)

== April 8, 1955 (Friday) ==
- The British Railway Clearing House is dissolved.

== April 9, 1955 (Saturday) ==
- A World War II Lincoln bomber crashes into Mount Superbus, Australia, in the early hours the morning, during a medical evacuation of a sick baby from Townsville, Queensland, to Eagle Farm airfield in Brisbane. The crew of four RAAF personnel and the two passengers are all killed.

== April 10, 1955 (Sunday) ==
- Carol Jones, later the mother of Kylie and Dannii Minogue, emigrates with her family from Maesteg in Wales to Australia.
- Died: Pierre Teilhard de Chardin, 73, French Jesuit priest, philosopher, paleontologist and geologist

== April 11, 1955 (Monday) ==
- A bomb detonates aboard the Air India Lockheed L-749A Constellation Kashmir Princess, carrying delegates to the Bandung Conference in Djakarta, Indonesia. The aircraft explodes in mid-air and crashes into the South China Sea, killing 16 of the 19 people on board. Taiwanese Kuomintang agents had planted the bomb in a failed attempt to assassinate Chinese Premier Zhou Enlai, who had changed his travel plans and was not on the plane.
- Mars Year 1, Sol 1 of the Martian Calendar.

== April 12, 1955 (Tuesday) ==
- Jonas Salk's polio vaccine, having passed large-scale trials earlier in the United States, receives full approval by the US Food and Drug Administration.

== April 13, 1955 (Wednesday) ==
- Born: Kawaka Muwenda Mutebi II of Buganda, in Mengo, Uganda

== April 14, 1955 (Thursday) ==
- The Detroit Red Wings win the Stanley Cup for the 7th time in franchise history, but will not win again until 1997.

== April 15, 1955 (Friday) ==
- The Middle East Treaty Organization (MENTO) is formed by Iran, Iraq, Pakistan, Turkey, and the United Kingdom, with the objective of containing the Soviet Union (USSR) by having a line of strong states along the USSR's southwestern frontier.
- Ray Kroc opens his first McDonald's Inc. restaurant, in Des Plaines, Illinois.
- Born: Dodi Fayed, Egyptian businessman, in Alexandria, the son of Mohamed Al-Fayed (died 1997)

== April 16, 1955 (Saturday) ==
- A Burma-Japanese peace treaty, signed in Rangoon on November 5, 1954, comes into effect, formally ending a state of war between the two countries that has not existed for a long time.
- Sir Laurence Olivier's film version of Shakespeare's Richard III, is released in the UK.

== April 17, 1955 (Sunday) ==
- Imre Nagy, the communist Premier of Hungary, loses his position as Chairman of the Council of Ministers, apparently for being too moderate.

== April 18, 1955 (Monday) ==
- The Bandung Conference opens in Indonesia. The twenty-nine participating countries represent nearly one-quarter of the Earth's land surface and a total population of 1.5 billion people.
- Died: Albert Einstein, 76, German-born physicist, Nobel Prize laureate

== April 19, 1955 (Tuesday) ==
- In the Kazakh Soviet Socialist Republic, Zhumabek Tashenov replaces Nurtas Undasynov as Chairman of the Presidium of the Supreme Soviet.

== April 20, 1955 (Wednesday) ==
- After twelve hours of debate in the Victorian Legislative Assembly on Henry Bolte's motion of no-confidence against the Labor government of John Cain in the Legislative Assembly, eleven members who have been expelled from the Labor Party cross the floor to support Bolte's motion. With his government defeated, Cain obtains a dissolution of parliament later that day.
- George Walbridge Perkins, Jr. replaces John Chambers Hughes as United States Permanent Representative to NATO.
- The first "DON'T WALK" Pedestrian crossing signs are installed in New York City.
- Born: Svante Pääbo, evolutionary geneticist, Nobel Prize laureate, in Stockholm, Sweden

== April 21, 1955 (Thursday) ==
- Born: Tūheitia Paki, Māori king, in Huntly, New Zealand

== April 22, 1955 (Friday) ==
- Died: Adnan al-Malki, 37, Syrian military leader, assassinated at Damascus Municipal Stadium by Younis Abdul Rahim

== April 23, 1955 (Saturday) ==
- Born: Tony Miles, English chess grandmaster, in Birmingham (died 2001)

== April 24, 1955 (Sunday) ==
- End of the Asian-African Conference held in Indonesia.
- The Canadian Pacific Railway inaugurates The Canadian and Super Continental passenger trains between Montreal, Quebec / Toronto, Ontario and Vancouver, British Columbia.

== April 25, 1955 (Monday) ==
- The 10th Vuelta a España bicycle race begins.
- Died: Constance Collier, 77, English-born stage and screen actress

== April 26, 1955 (Tuesday) ==
- The 1955 Cannes Film Festival opens with Du rififi chez les hommes by Jules Dassin.

== April 27, 1955 (Wednesday) ==
- East Germany and the Soviet Union sign an agreement transferring Berlin Schönefeld Airport from Soviet Army to East German civilian control.

== April 28, 1955 (Thursday) ==
- Withernsea High School, in Yorkshire, UK, is officially opened by Edward Frederick Lindley Wood, 1st Earl of Halifax.

== April 29, 1955 (Friday) ==
- Giovanni Gronchi completes his term as President of Italy's Chamber of Deputies.
- Born: Leslie Jordan, American actor and comedian, in Chattanooga, Tennessee (d. 2022)

== April 30, 1955 (Saturday) ==
- Born: Julio Cobos, Vice President of Argentina 2007–2011, in Mendoza
