= 1955 Academy Awards =

1955 Academy Awards may refer to:

- 27th Academy Awards, the Academy Awards ceremony that took place in 1955
- 28th Academy Awards, the 1956 ceremony honoring the best in film for 1955
