= Jack Edwards Airport =

Airport in Alabama, United States

Gulf Shores International Airport/Jack Edwards Field
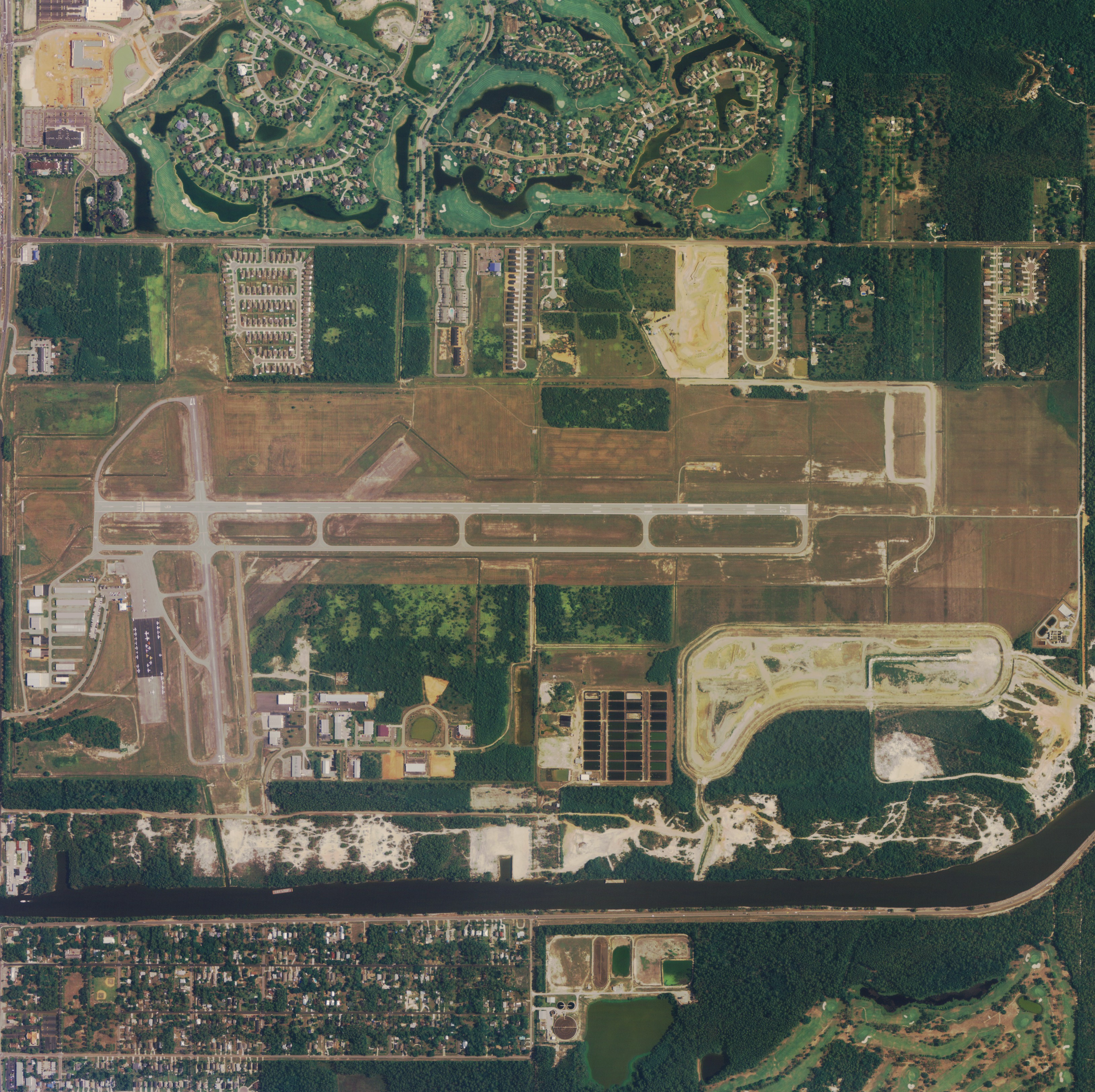
- NAIP aerial image, 2006
- IATA: GUF; ICAO: KJKA; FAA LID: JKA

Summary
- Airport type: Public
- Owner: Gulf Shores Airport Authority
- Serves: Gulf Shores, Alabama
- Elevation AMSL: 17 ft (5.2 m)
- Coordinates: 30°17′23″N 087°40′18″W
- Website: www.jka.us.com

Map
- Location of airport in Alabama JKA (the United States)

Runways
Direction	Length		Surface
Direction	ft	m	Surface
9/27	6,962	2,122	Asphalt
17/35	3,596	1,096	Asphalt

Statistics (2023)
- Aircraft operations (year ending 1/31): 61,372
- Based aircraft: 116
- Source: Federal Aviation Administration

Gulf Shores International Airport/Jack Edwards Field (IATA: GUF, ICAO: KJKA, FAA LID: JKA) is a public use airport in Baldwin County, Alabama, United States. It is owned by Gulf Shores Airport Authority and located two nautical miles (4 km) north of the City of Gulf Shores. Also known as Jack Edwards National Airport, it is included in the National Plan of Integrated Airport Systems for 2011–2015, which categorized it as a general aviation facility.

This airport is assigned a three-letter location identifier of JKA by the Federal Aviation Administration, but the International Air Transport Association (IATA) airport code is GUF. The International Civil Aviation Organization (ICAO) airport code is KJKA.

== History ==
Jack Edwards Airport was originally an outlying field (Canal Field) for Naval Air Station Pensacola. In 1977, under the Surplus Property Act of 1944, the U.S. Navy sold it to the state of Alabama. The new airport was named for U.S. Rep. Jack Edwards, and a terminal was built. In 1983 the state sold the airport to the city of Gulf Shores, and additional acreage was acquired. A new terminal was built in 1998 and a runway extension was completed in 2003. In 1999, there was a total of 47,000 flights.

In 2024, ground was broken on a new passenger terminal capable of handling 100+ seat narrowbody jets. Allegiant Air began service to Jack Edwards Airport on May 21, 2025.

== Facilities and aircraft ==
Jack Edwards Airport covers an area of 838 acres (339 ha) at an elevation of 17 feet (5 m) above mean sea level. It has two runways with asphalt surfaces: 9/27 is 6,962 by 100 feet (2,122 x 30 m) and 17/35 is 3,596 by 75 feet (1,096 x 23 m).

For the 12-month period ending January 31, 2023, the airport had 61,372 aircraft operations, an average of 168 per day: 91% general aviation, 7% military, 2% air taxi, and <1% commercial. At that time there were 116 aircraft based at this airport: 86 single-engine, 12 multi-engine, 10 jet, 1 helicopter, and 7 ultralights.

Southern Airways Express previously served the airport, beginning in June 2013, but later ceased operations to a number of airports including Jack Edwards due to cost considerations.

Allegiant Air currently serves the airport with A319, A320, and 737 MAX series jetliners.

== Airline and destinations ==
Airlines	Destinations
Allegiant Air	Appleton, Belleville/St. Louis, Cincinnati, Des Moines, Fayetteville/Bentonville, Houston–Hobby, Huntsville, Kansas City, Knoxville, Little Rock (begins May 20, 2027), Louisville, Nashville Oklahoma City, Omaha, Shreveport (begins May 20, 2027), Springfield/Branson, Wichita (begins May 20, 2027); Seasonal: Indianapolis (begins May 20, 2027)
Sun Country Airlines	Minneapolis/St. Paul (begins April 16, 2027)

Destinations map
Destinations from Jack Edwards Airport
Red = Year-round destination
Green = Seasonal destination
Blue = Future destination
Pink = Destination being terminated

== Statistics ==
=== Top destinations ===
Busiest domestic routes from JKA/GUF (September 2025 – August 2026)
Rank	City	Passengers	Carriers
1	Belleville/St. Louis, Illinois	15,730	Allegiant
2	Cincinnati, Ohio	14,940	Allegiant
3	Appleton, Wisconsin	12,980	Allegiant
4	Des Moines, Iowa	12,870	Allegiant
5	Fayetteville/Bentonville, Arkansas	7,530	Allegiant
6	Nashville, Tennessee	7,390	Allegiant
7	Kansas City, Missouri	5,410	Allegiant
8	Oklahoma City, Oklahoma	4,890	Allegiant
9	Springfield/Branson, Missouri	4,310	Allegiant
10	Louisville, Kentucky	3,650	Allegiant

== See also ==
- List of airports in Alabama
