= William O'Dea =

Irish republican activist (1888 – 1955)

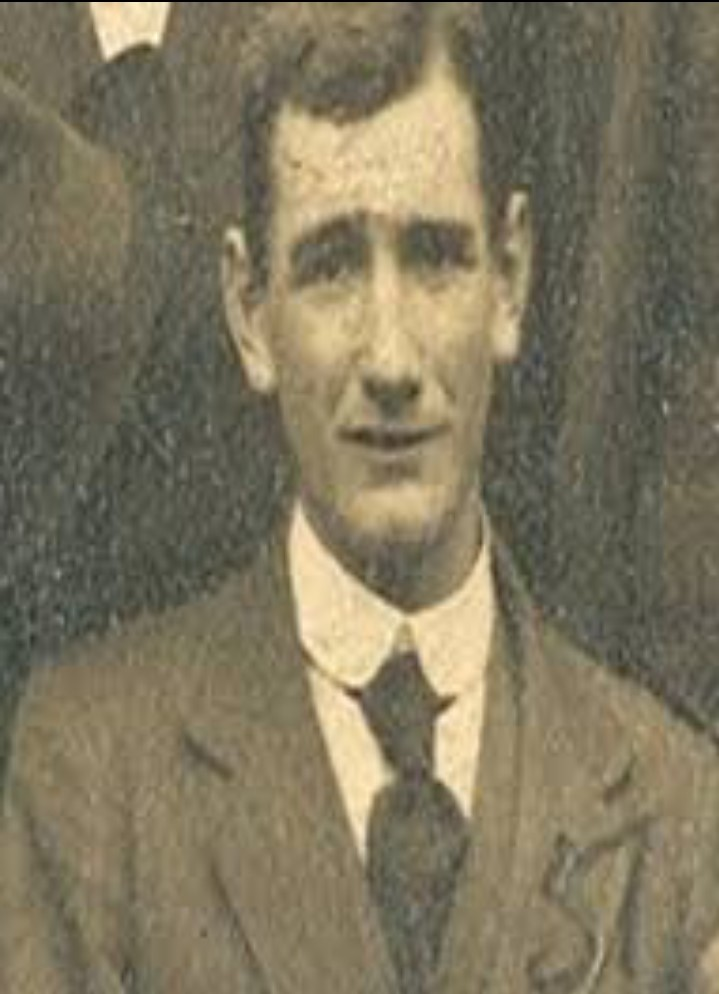
- Born: June 12, 1888; Dublin
- Died: March 10, 1955 (aged 66); Dublin
- Burial place: Glasnevin Cemetery
- Relatives: Laurence O'Dea (father); Seán T.O'Kelly (cousin)
- Military career
- Allegiance: Irish Volunteers (IVF) (1916)
- Branch: D Company, 1st Battalion; 26th Rifle Battalion
- Conflicts: 1916 Easter Rising

William O'Dea (12 June 1888 – 19 March 1955) was an Irish republican member of the Irish Volunteer Force who was active during the 1916 Easter Rising (Irish: Éirí Amach na Cásca). He was stationed in the Mendicity Institution for over two days.

== Early life ==
William O'Dea was born on 12 June 1888 at 16 Great Ship Street Dublin. His family were in the basket making industry and ran a production facility on Werburgh Street.

== Fenian involvement ==
William O'Dea joined the Irish Volunteer Force in 1914 at the Rotunda ice rink and would go on train in Blackall Street. O'Dea's' father, Laurence played a role in procuring arms in lead up to the Easter Rising. He was also in regular contact with Seán Heuston and his Fenian politics is credited with having a major influence on his son, William.

== Easter Rising (1916) ==
Prior to the Easter Rising William was living in Cook Street with his family. William was due to be married on Easter Monday, however the Military Council had met the day before and decided to mobilize troops on that day. Under his Commander Seán Heuston he was part of D Company, which assembled at St George's Church. The group then awaited orders at Liberty Hall, before marching over Butt Bridge towards Ushers Island. Heuston ordered his men to seize the Mendicity Institute and civilians were removed.

According to the transcript of a statement given by William O'Dea on the occupation of the Mendicity Institute (in 1944):

"The Mendicity Institution is an old building on the southern quays, a few hundred yards from Collins Barracks, which in 1916 were the Royal Barracks. The Mendicity was not an ideal stronghold as the windows are large and it stands in from the houses on both sides, but it was the only place in which we could hope to gain our object of holding up any troops trying to advance along either side of the quays towards the Four Courts area."

"After our Commandant Sean Heuston received his orders in Liberty Hall, we proceeded at a quick pace along the southern quays carrying our small supply of grenades and ammunition in a couple of leather bags, with a rifle passed through the handles, and held at both ends. We had to barricade the doors and windows of the mendicity in double quick time before any news reached the Royal Barracks of the incidents downtown. We had not long to wait. A body of troops came along the North Quays in full marching orders. We let them be abreast of the building before we opened fire. They scattered in all directions. Some took cover behind the quay walls. There was a scene of great confusion. Trams were abandoned and people ran hither and thither in panic. Later, more troops managed to place the machine guns under cover of the bridge at the corner of Queen Street and then they peppered our position for several days. The final assault was made by working their way under the cover of the houses on both sides of the Mendicity and hurling Mills bombs through the large windows I mentioned before."

"Staines "had just relived me of my post at one of the windows. "Pitch them back" shouted Sean Heuston. He meant the live bombs that were coming in the windows. We succeeded in throwing some of them out, but one burst in the act and badly wounded young Staines. Sergeant Balfe was also wounded. Part of the floor was torn up and our grenades also explode. Seán Heuston shouted for bandages. I crawled along the flor into another room and pulled a sheet from a bed with my teeth, and trailed it along in that manner too. So intense was the rifle fire directed on the back of the building that I dare not lift my head. But it was through the back all the same that we dashed in the hope of fighting our way out. We dashed along a plank we had been placed to a window on the Monday. So intense was the machine gun and rifle fire that the gravel in the yard was torn up and peppered on our faces. I just gained the corner of a wall, and on looking back saw young Wilson, a lad from Swords, fall, shot through the head. I watched the blood flowing from his forehead gradually rise in a small heap until it reached the bullet hole."

"Escape or further resistance was impossible. There were hundreds of soldiers surrounding us. I took the bolt from my Lee Enfield rifle and threw it and my revolver into an old water tank."

"We were taken to the Royal Barracks to await trial and receive a bad time. We had to pass through lines of soldiers who gave us a rough reception."

Following the surrender, O'Dea was sent to the Royal Barracks and then Arbour Hill. Along with Sean Hueston, Patrick Kelly and James Crenigan, he was court-martialed in Richmond Barracks on 4 May 1916. O'Dea was taken to Kilmainham Gaol, where he was court-martialed and sentenced to death on 8 May. His sentence was later commuted to 3 years penal servitude, following public anger at the execution of the rebellion's leaders; this, however, came too late for Heuston, who was executed on the 8 May 1916, aged 25.

== Release and return to Ireland ==
O'Dea was sent to serve his sentence in Lewes Prison. While being transferred from Dublin to Portland Prison on May 15, O'Dea spotted his fiancé on the quay. He still had the wedding ring intended to be given to her on Easter Monday and after speaking to an officer a sergeant was ordered to give the girl the ring. While serving time in Lewes Jail, O'Dea barbered other inmates including Éamon de Valera. Despite his sentence being three years, he was released in June 1917 due to a general amnesty.

== Later life ==
O'Dea was married and moved to Dominick Street in 1920; from here he continued his basket-making business. After this, he moved to Clontarf and in his later years was a landlord. In 1941, one of his buildings were damaged during the accidental German bombing of Dublin. During the Emergency period in Ireland O'Dea became part of the 26th Rifle Battalion of the I.R.A. He noted when talking about Collins Barracks, which he had been held in following his arrest, that "my proudest moment was when I once again marched through those barracks, not as a prisoner but as a free man, to join the 26th Battalion". O'Dea did not talk about his part in the Rising often, due to having become disillusioned with Ireland's new administration.

O'Dea died in 1955, a year after the building he had fought in had been demolished. His funeral was attend by his cousin, Sean T. O'Kelly. His coffin was draped with the tri-color and he received full military honours.
