= 1955 Swiss tenant and consumer protection referendum =

Swiss referendum

A referendum on tenant and consumer protection was held in Switzerland on 13 March 1955. Voters were asked whether they approved of a popular initiative "for the protection of tenants and consumers", which would prolong price controls. Although the proposal was approved by a majority of voters, it was rejected by a majority of cantons, so did not come into force. Voters also voted on a counterproposal, which was rejected by a majority of voters and cantons.

== Results ==
=== Proposal ===
Choice	Popular vote		Cantons		
Choice	Votes	%	Full	Half	Total
For	392,588	50.24	6	2	7
Against	381,130	48.77	13	4	15
No answer	7,784	1.00	–	–	–
Blank votes	16,515	–	–	–	–
Invalid votes	5,675	–	–	–	–
Total	803,692	100	19	6	22
Registered voters/turnout	1,447,187	55.5	–	–	–
Source: Direct Democracy

=== Counter-proposal ===
Choice	Popular vote		Cantons		
Choice	Votes	%	Full	Half	Total
For	317,934	40.68	7	3	8.5
Against	449,087	57.46	12	3	13.5
No answer	14,481	1.85	–	–	–
Blank votes	16,515	–	–	–	–
Invalid votes	5,675	–	–	–	–
Total	803,692	100	19	6	22
Registered voters/turnout	1,447,187	55.5	–	–	–
Source: Direct Democracy
