= United Air Lines Flight 409 =

1955 aviation accident

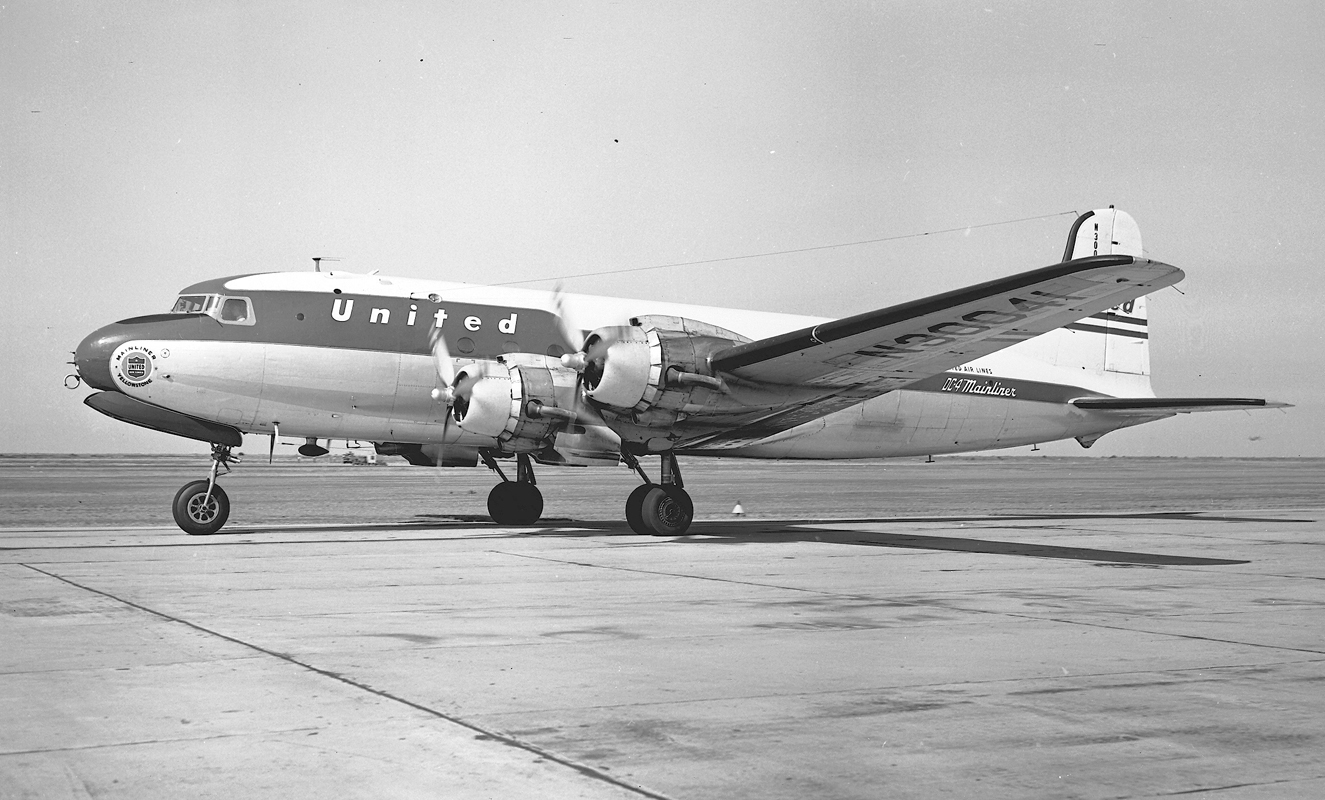
- A United Air Lines Douglas DC-4, similar to the aircraft involved in the accident

Accident
- Date: October 6, 1955
- Summary: Controlled flight into terrain
- Site: Medicine Bow Peak, Carbon County, near Centennial, Wyoming, United States; 41°20′42″N 106°19′45″W

Aircraft
- Aircraft type: Douglas DC-4
- Operator: United Air Lines
- Call sign: UNITED 409
- Registration: N30062
- Flight origin: New York City, New York
- 1st stopover: Chicago, Illinois
- 2nd stopover: Stapleton International Airport, Denver, Colorado, United States
- Last stopover: Salt Lake City International Airport, Salt Lake City, Utah, United States
- Destination: San Francisco, California
- Occupants: 66
- Passengers: 63
- Crew: 3
- Fatalities: 66
- Survivors: 0

United Air Lines Flight 409 was a scheduled flight which originated in New York City, New York. The final flight destination was San Francisco, California, with stops in Chicago, Denver and Salt Lake City. The aircraft operating the service, a Douglas DC-4 propliner, registered as N30062, crashed into Medicine Bow Peak, near Laramie, Wyoming, on October 6, 1955, killing all 66 people on board (63 passengers, 3 crew members). The victims included five female members of the Mormon Tabernacle Choir and military personnel. At the time, this was the deadliest airline crash in the history of American commercial aviation. Another 66 lives had been lost earlier that year in the March 22 crash in Hawaii of a United States Navy Douglas R6D-1 Liftmaster military transport aircraft, and 66 had also died in the August 11 mid-air collision of two United States Air Force C-119G Flying Boxcars over West Germany, placing the three crashes in a three-way tie as the deadliest aviation incidents in 1955.

== Timeline ==
Flight 409 left New York, New York one hour and 11 minutes late. Routine crew changes were made in Chicago and Denver. Flight 409 departed Denver, Colorado at 6:33 a.m. on October 6, 1955, 83 minutes after its scheduled departure time. The assigned path the airliner was expected to fly was along airways V-4 Denver to Laramie, Wyoming V-118 to Rock River, Wyoming radio, V-6 to Fort Bridger, Wyoming, and V-32 to a landing in Salt Lake City. The flight was operating under Visual Flight Rules and was assigned a cruising altitude of 10,000 feet. Because the aircraft was not pressurized, the altitude was chosen to keep the passengers and crew from experiencing the discomfort that flying higher could cause. The route assigned to the airliner was specifically designed to allow safe passage at 10,000 feet over the continental divide in the Rocky Mountains.

An expected position report from the United crew, scheduled for 8:11 a.m. while over Rock River, was not received, and repeated attempts to make radio contact with flight 409 were met with no response. With the airliner's status unknown, the Civil Aeronautics Authority was alerted to the missing aircraft. No radar was in place for civil aviation in this region in 1955. With no radar traces, manual searches were required to find the aircraft.

== Search effort ==
The Wyoming Air National Guard launched two search aircraft: a two-seat T-33 Shooting Star piloted by Mel Conine and a single seat F-80 Shooting Star piloted by Ed Weed. Working on the assumption that the United plane may have taken an unauthorized short cut to make up for the 83-minute delay out of Denver, the two search planes pointed their aircraft toward the highest mountains in the region, Elk Mountain and Medicine Bow Peak. After a search of Elk Mountain failed to find the missing DC-4, Conine and his observer spotted at 11:40 a.m. a black stain and wreckage just southwest of the highest portion of Medicine Bow Peak. Turbulence kept them too far away to locate any possible survivors and they left the site to return to their base in Cheyenne.

The New York Times (Oct. 7, 1955) reported:

"First rescuers to reach the scene said they had found about 50 bodies strewn along a 300-foot course down the face of the mountain. Only a tail piece, part of the fuselage and a wing of the plane had been located at mid-afternoon by rescuers who fought snowdrifts and a howling wind on the 12,005-foot Medicine Bow Peak. The mountain is about 40 miles west of here in the Snowy Range. The front part of the split plane was believed to have fallen down the other side of the peak. Another rescue group went up the north face of the mountain from Rawlins. The operation was suspended this evening because of a snowstorm and darkness.

The scene was marked by two huge patches of oil where the plane's engines apparently struck about 50-75 feet from the peak. The wreckage then slid down the steep incline in two ravines, much of it coming to rest 300 feet down on a small glacier. I don't see how there would be a chance of anyone surviving, said Capt. Conine, Wyoming Air National Guard jet pilot, who was one of the first to spot the wreckage.

A C-47 was sent from Cheyenne, Wyo., to circle the peak, particularly the northwest side, to search for the front portion of the plane. The Civil Aeronautics Administration said planes were unable to fly near the mountain because of the weather conditions.

== Recovery ==
Recovery of the widely scattered remains of the victims was extremely challenging due to the difficult terrain at the crash site. At the base of the almost perpendicular cliff where the aircraft hit, movement was hindered by a wide talus of weathered, fragmented rock and large boulders, all piled loosely on a steep slope. Mountaineers doing the recovery work also had to be constantly wary of rock falls that might be triggered by the activities of those above them on the cliff face. Cold weather and occasional snow also played a role in impeding recovery efforts. The recovery of human remains was not completed until the evening of October 11, 1955, five full days after the accident.

== Investigation ==
Due to safety concerns, the CAB accident investigation team —not trained in alpine mountaineering techniques— was unable to visit the cliff location where the DC-4 initially hit. Study of the wreckage that could be retrieved for examination suggested a nose up attitude and an unusually low airspeed of the plane, implying that the plane was attempting a climb at the time of its crash. The reasons for this are not explicitly known, but several theories exist:

- An altimeter indicating an inaccurate altitude, leading the pilot to believe he was higher than he actually was;
- Mountain obscuration by clouds, preventing visual sighting of the mountain peak before it was too late to react to prevent the crash;
- Turbulence, specifically downdrafts, around Medicine Bow peak, pushing Flight 409 into the mountain.

Possible incapacitation of crew by carbon monoxide emanating from a faulty cabin heater was speculated upon based on recovery crew observations that crew bodies appeared 'discolored.' This theory was never proven, and the CAB report specifically states that there was no evidence to support crew incapacitation.

After the investigation of the accessible wreckage was completed, United Air Lines requested that the remaining debris be destroyed by the military. Attempts were made to accomplish this, but despite the use of explosives, artillery fire and —according to most sources— napalm bombs dropped from aircraft, complete obliteration of the wreckage was not possible. One source, a 2007 book about the Rocky Mountain Rescue Group, contradicts the assertion that military jets bombed the site with napalm; instead, the book states that the cliff face was mined with explosives that were detonated in the spring of 1956, and the event was tightly controlled and not publicized. Regardless of the disposal method, small fragments of flight 409's airframe and parts of the engines still exist in the area surrounding the crash site.

== Legacy ==
Prior to the loss of United 409, the deadliest scheduled airline accident in U.S. history was the June 1950 disappearance of Northwest Orient Airlines Flight 2501 over Lake Michigan, when 58 died. (Note: Although Flight 409 was the deadliest scheduled airliner accident in U.S. history at the time, worldwide there were previous crashes with higher death tolls. Eighty died in the 1950 Llandow air disaster in Wales, United Kingdom, and the deadliest military aviation accident was the crash of a U.S. Air Force C-124 transport aircraft on June 18, 1953 in Japan, costing the lives of 129.) The 66 lives lost on Medicine Bow Peak remained the highest death toll on a scheduled airline flight in the U.S. for less than a year. In June 1956 two airliners, a Super Constellation and a DC-7, collided over the Grand Canyon, killing 128 people. Flight 409's crash, and other crashes and mid-air collisions in the United States that occurred over the next several years, convinced the U.S. Congress to improve airline safety procedures, and to increase civil aviation radar coverage.

On August 25, 2001, a privately funded bronze memorial plaque was dedicated in the Miner's Camp turnout (41°20′30″N 106°18′21″W), along Wyoming Highway 130 (Snowy Range Road). The plaque faces the mountain where the crash occurred. The plaque reads, "In memory of the 66 passengers and crew that perished on Medicine Bow Peak October 6, 1955".

== See also ==
- 1955 in aviation
- 1955 in the United States
- Aviation accidents and incidents
- List of accidents and incidents involving commercial aircraft

== Notes and references ==
Notes
