= 1955 Hawaii R6D-1 crash =

Fatal crash due to pilot error

1955 Hawaii R6D-1 Crash
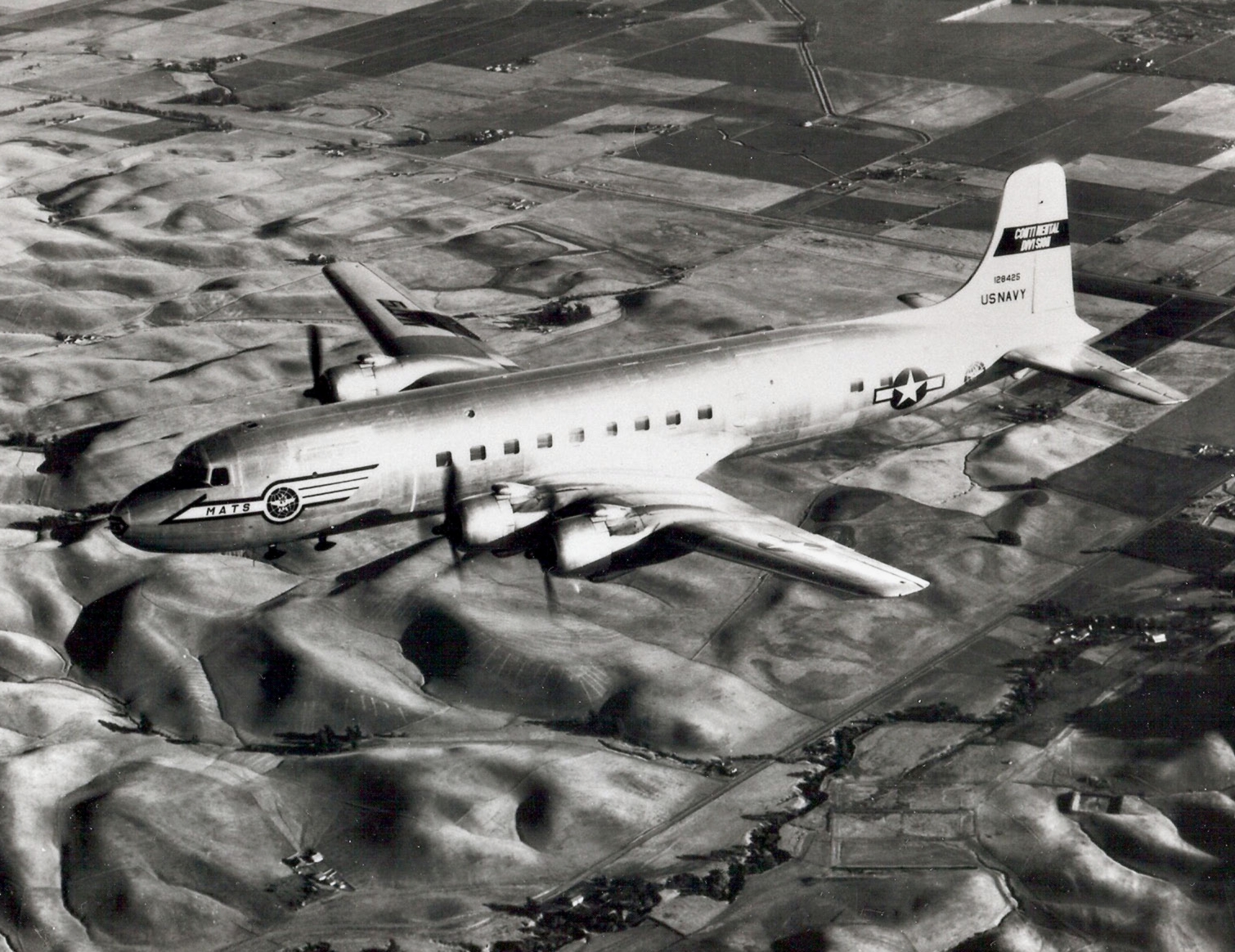
- A U.S. Navy R6D-1 Liftmaster, similar to the accident aircraft, operating for the Military Air Transportation Service in the 1950s

Accident
- Date: March 22, 1955
- Summary: Controlled flight into terrain
- Site: Pali Kea Peak, Waianae Range, Oahu, Territory of Hawaii, United States; 21.4392°N 158.098°W

Aircraft
- Aircraft type: Douglas R6D-1 Liftmaster
- Operator: United States Navy for Military Air Transport Service
- Registration: BuNo 131612
- Flight origin: Tokyo, Japan
- Last stopover: Hickam Air Force Base, Territory of Hawaii
- Destination: Travis Air Force Base, California
- Occupants: 66
- Passengers: 57
- Crew: 9
- Fatalities: 66
- Survivors: 0

The 1955 Hawaii R6D-1 crash was an accident involving a Douglas R6D-1 Liftmaster of the United States Navy which crashed into a mountain peak in Hawaii on 22 March 1955, killing all 66 people on board. At the time, it was the worst crash involving any variant of the Douglas DC-6 airliner the second-worst aviation accident in U.S. history, and one of the worst air accidents anywhere in history, and it equaled the 11 August mid-air collision of two United States Air Force C-119G Flying Boxcars over West Germany and the 6 October United Air Lines Flight 409 crash as the deadliest air accident of 1955. It remains the worst air disaster in the history of Hawaii and the deadliest accident involving a heavier-than-air aircraft in the history of United States naval aviation.

== Aircraft ==
The R6D-1 involved, Bureau Number 131612, had been manufactured in 1953 and was based at Moffett Field, California. The R6D-1 was the U.S. Navy version of the United States Air Force's C-118 Liftmaster and of the civilian Douglas DC-6B airliner.

== Flight history ==
The R6D-1 was carrying a U.S. Navy crew of nine (led by 35-year-old Lieutenant Commander Harold M. O'Leary) and was loaded to capacity with 57 passengers on a Military Air Transport Service flight from Tokyo, Japan, to Travis Air Force Base, California, via Hickam Air Force Base, Territory of Hawaii. The passengers included 55 servicemen – 17 U.S. Air Force, 22 United States Army, 12 United States Marine Corps, and four U.S. Navy personnel – and two civilians, who were the wife and three-year-old daughter of one of the military passengers. After making its stop at Hickam, the aircraft took off at 6:06 p.m. local time on 21 March 1955 for the final leg of its flight to California. The crew began to experience radio problems, and four hours and 20 minutes after departure they decided to return to Hickam.

The R6D-1 was flying in a heavy rainstorm as it descended to land at Hickam early on 22 March 1955. At 2:03 a.m. local time while on its descent, the aircraft flew into 3,098-foot (944 m) Pali Kea Peak at the southern end of Oahu's Waianae Range, 15 miles (24 km) northwest of Honolulu. Eyewitnesses reported that the pilot turned his landing lights on just before striking the mountain and, presumably seeing the mountain ahead, banked sharply to avoid it. The maneuver was too late, and the R6D-1 struck a sheer cliff about 200 feet (61 m) below the tip of the peak and exploded.

The accident was the first of two major air disasters involving an R6D-1 in less than 19 months, the second being the disappearance of an R6D-1 over the Atlantic Ocean in October 1956.

== Investigation ==
The post-crash investigation concluded that the R6D-1's crew had made a navigational error which placed the aircraft 8 miles (13 km) off course. Straying into the Waianae Range in darkness without realizing their error until almost the last second, the crew flew the aircraft into the peak.

== See also ==
- List of accidents and incidents involving military aircraft (1955–1959)
