= American Airlines Flight 711 =

1955 aviation accident

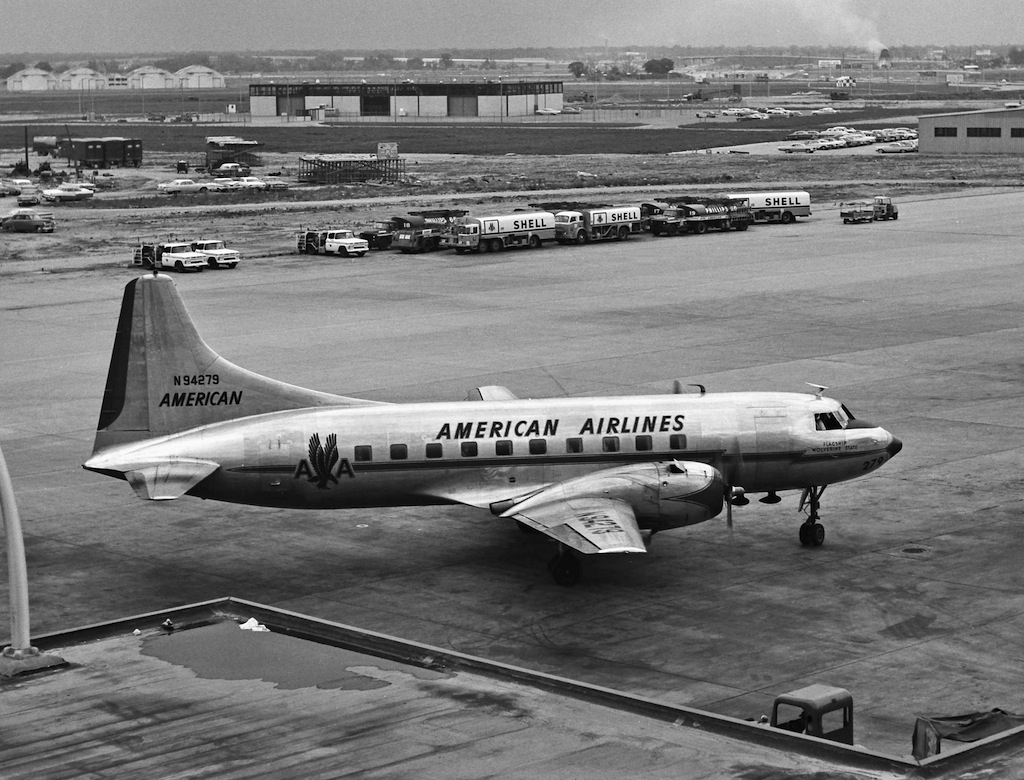
- An American Airlines Convair CV-240, similar to the aircraft involved in the accident

Accident
- Date: March 20, 1955
- Summary: Pilot error, Controlled flight into terrain
- Site: 0.25 miles from Springfield Municipal Airport, Greene County, Missouri, United States; 37.257°N 93.401°W

Aircraft
- Aircraft type: Convair CV-240-0
- Aircraft name: Flagship Nashville
- Operator: American Airlines
- Registration: N94234
- Flight origin: Newark, New Jersey
- 1st stopover: Syracuse, New York
- 2nd stopover: Rochester, New York
- 3rd stopover: Detroit, Michigan
- 4th stopover: Chicago, Illinois
- 5th stopover: Saint Louis, Missouri
- 6th stopover: Springfield, Missouri
- Last stopover: Joplin, Missouri
- Destination: Tulsa, Oklahoma
- Passengers: 32
- Crew: 3
- Fatalities: 13 (2 crew, 11 passengers)
- Injuries: 22
- Survivors: 22

American Airlines Flight 711 was a scheduled flight departing from Newark, New Jersey to Tulsa, Oklahoma, with several intermediate stops, Springfield, Missouri, being one of them. On March 20, 1955, the aircraft operating the service, a Convair CV-240-0, registration N94234, crashed into a muddy field on approach to land at Springfield Municipal Airport near Springfield, Missouri, killing 13 of the 35 aboard (11 passengers, 2 crew members), and injuring the other 22 on board. Of the three crew members, the pilot survived, and the co-pilot and stewardess did not.

The pilot of the flight, Jack Pripish, suffered considerable injuries including the loss of his right eye, and was in a coma for some time after the crash. Almost two weeks after the crash, Pripish told reporters he could remember nothing of it.

Findings of fact regarding the crash were published by the Civil Aeronautics Board on September 22, 1955. The board determined that a complete instrument landing approach into Springfield-Branson was not made, as would have been required based on the deteriorating weather conditions at the time. Evidence showed that the crew didn't seem to be aware of the aircraft's altitude and that the aircraft was descending. The board believed it was probable that "the pilots were devoting their attention away from their instruments and outside the cockpit, possibly toward the distant airport lights."
