= 2006 Sutton London Borough Council election =

← 2002	4 May 2006	2010 →

All 54 seats to Sutton London Borough Council 28 seats needed for a majority
	First party	Second party
Party	Liberal Democrats	Conservative
Seats won	32	22
Seat change	▼11	▲14
Popular vote	25,911	24,317
Percentage	44.1%	41.4%
Swing	▼4.9%	▲6.2%
- Map of the results of the 2006 Sutton council election. Conservatives in blue and the Liberal Democrats in yellow.
Council control before election
Liberal Democrats
Council control after election
Liberal Democrats

The 2006 Sutton Council election took place on 4 May 2006 to elect members of Sutton London Borough Council in London, England. The whole council was up for election and the Liberal Democrats maintained control of the council, despite losing 11 seats to the Conservatives.

== Election result ==
Sutton local election result 2006
Party	Seats	Gains	Losses	Net gain/loss	Seats %	Votes %	Votes	+/−
Liberal Democrats	32	3	14	▼11	59.3	44.1	25,911	▼4.9
Conservative	22	14	0	▲14	40.7	41.4	24,317	▲6.2
Labour	0	0	3	▼3	0.0	8.3	4,888	▼4.0
Green	0	0	0	Steady	0.0	2.7	1,556	▼0.6
Independent	0	0	0	Steady	0.0	1.5	888	New
BNP	0	0	0	Steady	0.0	1.0	588	New
UKIP	0	0	0	Steady	0.0	0.8	449	New
CPA	0	0	0	Steady	0.0	0.2	116	New

== Ward results ==
=== Beddington North ===
Beddington North (3)
Party	Candidate	Votes	%	±%
Liberal Democrats	John Keys	1,377	44.3	
Liberal Democrats	John Leach	1,350		
Liberal Democrats	Jenny Slark	1,318		
Conservative	Howard Bowles	1,174	37.8	
Conservative	Malcolm Brown	1,153		
Conservative	Paul Skeet	1,048		
Labour	Nicholas Carter	288	9.3	
UKIP	Leslie Price	268	8.6	
Labour	Susan Theobald	256		
Labour	John Weir	130		
Turnout			40.8	
Liberal Democrats hold		Swing		
Liberal Democrats hold		Swing		
Liberal Democrats hold		Swing		

=== Beddington South ===
Beddington South (3)
Party	Candidate	Votes	%	±%
Conservative	Peter Wallis	1,492	49.3	
Conservative	Marion Williams	1,437		
Conservative	Terence Faulds	1,401		
Liberal Democrats	Sally Brearley	1,292	42.7	
Liberal Democrats	Peter Baxter-Derrington	1,268		
Liberal Democrats	Muhammad Sadiq	1,213		
Labour	Beresford Caramba-Coker	240	7.9	
Labour	Richard Aitken	238		
Labour	Renuka Marley	200		
Turnout			45.0	
Conservative gain from Liberal Democrats		Swing		
Conservative gain from Liberal Democrats		Swing		
Conservative gain from Liberal Democrats		Swing		

=== Belmont ===
Belmont (3)
Party	Candidate	Votes	%	±%
Conservative	David Pickles	2,115	56.5	
Conservative	Peter Geiringer	1,987		
Conservative	Pamela Picknett	1,933		
Liberal Democrats	Russell Neale	1,095	29.3	
Liberal Democrats	Thomas Osborne	959		
Liberal Democrats	Eric Pridham	896		
Green	Brian Dougherty	322	8.6	
Labour	Gale Blears	211	5.6	
Labour	Geraldine Kerr	184		
Labour	John Brown	174		
Turnout			48.1	
Conservative hold		Swing		
Conservative hold		Swing		
Conservative hold		Swing		

=== Carshalton Central ===
Carshalton Central (3)
Party	Candidate	Votes	%	±%
Liberal Democrats	Hamish Pollock	1,578	42.2	
Conservative	Paul Scully	1,473	39.4	
Conservative	Eric Howell	1,387		
Conservative	Peter Mead	1,375		
Liberal Democrats	Alan Salter	1,365		
Liberal Democrats	Jill Whitehead	1,336		
Green	Robert Steel	356	9.5	
Green	Miranda Suheimat	238		
Labour	David Davis	216	5.8	
Labour	David Towler	207		
Labour	Anthony Thorpe	203		
CPA	Ashley Dickenson	116	3.1	
Turnout			47.6	
Liberal Democrats hold		Swing		
Conservative gain from Liberal Democrats		Swing		
Conservative gain from Liberal Democrats		Swing		

=== Carshalton South and Clockhouse ===
Carshalton South and Clockhouse (3)
Party	Candidate	Votes	%	±%
Conservative	Timothy Crowley	1,822	49.0	
Conservative	Moira Butt	1,753		
Conservative	John Kennedy	1,743		
Liberal Democrats	Paul Wingrove	1,677	45.1	
Liberal Democrats	Derek Yeo	1,653		
Liberal Democrats	Lal Hussain	1,599		
Labour	Marilynne Burbage	222	6.0	
Labour	Claire Shearer	222		
Labour	Peter Turner	194		
Turnout			52.6	
Conservative gain from Liberal Democrats		Swing		
Conservative gain from Liberal Democrats		Swing		
Conservative gain from Liberal Democrats		Swing		

=== Cheam ===
Cheam (3)
Party	Candidate	Votes	%	±%
Conservative	Eleanor Pinfold	2,251	57.8	
Conservative	Graham Whitham	2,170		
Conservative	Misdaq Zaidi	2,072		
Liberal Democrats	Robert Cummins	1,535	39.4	
Liberal Democrats	Alexandra Ankrah	1,468		
Liberal Democrats	Nicholas Kounoupias	1,389		
Labour	David Jarman	107	2.7	
Labour	Lyndon Edwards	99		
Labour	Laura Herridge	94		
Turnout			51.5	
Conservative hold		Swing		
Conservative hold		Swing		
Conservative hold		Swing		

=== Nonsuch ===
Nonsuch (3)
Party	Candidate	Votes	%	±%
Conservative	Christopher Dunlop	1,816	47.5	
Liberal Democrats	Kirsty Jerome	1,779	46.5	
Liberal Democrats	Roger Roberts	1,760		
Conservative	David Senior	1,753		
Conservative	Adrian Noble	1,750		
Liberal Democrats	Wendy Mathys	1,702		
Labour	Kathie Clark	227	5.9	
Labour	Cyril Salmon	177		
Labour	Marcus Papadopoulos	170		
Turnout			50.9	
Conservative gain from Liberal Democrats		Swing		
Liberal Democrats hold		Swing		
Liberal Democrats hold		Swing		

=== St Helier ===
St Helier (3)
Party	Candidate	Votes	%	±%
Liberal Democrats	Sheila Andrews	1,257	43.1	
Liberal Democrats	David Callaghan	1,161		
Liberal Democrats	David Theobald	1,147		
Labour	Charles Mansell	674	23.1	
Labour	Andrew Theobald	674		
Labour	Joseph Magee	662		
BNP	Charlotte Lewis	588	20.2	
Conservative	Gillian Walker	396	13.6	
Conservative	Eric Pillinger	365		
Conservative	Thomas Wortley	362		
Turnout			35.3	
Liberal Democrats gain from Labour		Swing		
Liberal Democrats gain from Labour		Swing		
Liberal Democrats gain from Labour		Swing		

=== Stonecot ===
Stonecot (3)
Party	Candidate	Votes	%	±%
Liberal Democrats	Anthony Young	1,590	49.1	
Liberal Democrats	Abigail Lock	1,446		
Liberal Democrats	Brendan Hudson	1,425		
Conservative	Raymond Hilldrup	1,413	43.6	
Conservative	Gary James	1,370		
Conservative	Sharon James	1,350		
Labour	Richard Dawson	237	7.3	
Labour	Gwendoline Fuller	230		
Labour	William Lang	199		
Turnout			43.0	
Liberal Democrats hold		Swing		
Liberal Democrats hold		Swing		
Liberal Democrats hold		Swing		

=== Sutton Central ===
Sutton Central (3)
Party	Candidate	Votes	%	±%
Liberal Democrats	John Brennan	1,371	54.7	
Liberal Democrats	Janet Lowne	1,340		
Liberal Democrats	Graham Tope	1,340		
Conservative	Elizabeth Fison	681	27.2	
Conservative	Margaret Greenwood	668		
Conservative	Christine Hicks	648		
Labour	Kathleen Allen	454	18.1	
Labour	Maria Ponto	422		
Labour	Enid Bakewell	397		
Turnout			36.5	
Liberal Democrats hold		Swing		
Liberal Democrats hold		Swing		
Liberal Democrats hold		Swing		

=== Sutton North ===
Sutton North (3)
Party	Candidate	Votes	%	±%
Liberal Democrats	Ruth Dombey	1,436	47.5	
Liberal Democrats	Lynette Gleeson	1,387		
Conservative	Clifford Carter	1,361	45.0	
Liberal Democrats	Marlene Heron	1,347		
Conservative	Darren Marsh	1,299		
Conservative	David Park	1,260		
Labour	Michael Cue	229	7.6	
Labour	Helen Martin	227		
Labour	Stephen Morton	212		
Turnout			42.4	
Liberal Democrats hold		Swing		
Liberal Democrats hold		Swing		
Conservative gain from Liberal Democrats		Swing		

=== Sutton South ===
Sutton South (3)
Party	Candidate	Votes	%	±%
Conservative	Tony Shields	1,502	44.3	
Conservative	Paul Newman	1,413		
Conservative	Barry Russell	1,393		
Liberal Democrats	Richard Clifton	1,336	39.4	
Liberal Democrats	Claire Stears	1,227		
Liberal Democrats	Mohamed Ali	1,205		
Independent	Peter Ticher	232	6.8	
UKIP	Ronald Newman	181	5.3	
Labour	Helen Jones	137	4.0	
Labour	Paul Harrison	124		
Labour	Ronald Phillips	103		
Turnout			46.6	
Conservative hold		Swing		
Conservative hold		Swing		
Conservative gain from Liberal Democrats		Swing		

=== Sutton West ===
Sutton West (3)
Party	Candidate	Votes	%	±%
Liberal Democrats	Ian Chapman	1,552	45.5	
Liberal Democrats	Myfanwy Wallace	1,522		
Liberal Democrats	Simon Wales	1,466		
Conservative	Richard Willis	1,415	41.5	
Conservative	Christopher Furey	1,414		
Conservative	Jonathan Pritchard	1,376		
Green	Peter Hickson	297	8.7	
Labour	Morgan McSweeney	149	4.4	
Labour	Ronald Williams	146		
Labour	Shawn Buck	132		
Turnout			45.1	
Liberal Democrats hold		Swing		
Liberal Democrats hold		Swing		
Liberal Democrats hold		Swing		

=== Wallington North ===
Wallington North (3)
Party	Candidate	Votes	%	±%
Liberal Democrats	Joan Hartfield	1,541	46.3	
Liberal Democrats	Bruce Glithero	1,532		
Liberal Democrats	Margaret Ali	1,451		
Conservative	Desmond Bowles	1,298	39.0	
Conservative	Dee Hyatt	1,262		
Conservative	Jane Pascoe	1,194		
Labour	Kathleen Reeds	244	7.3	
Green	Penelope Mouncey	242	7.3	
Labour	Gregory Charles	229		
Labour	Cecil Tate	229		
Green	Amy Pattenden	221		
Green	Phillip Mouncey	217		
Turnout			44.5	
Liberal Democrats hold		Swing		
Liberal Democrats hold		Swing		
Liberal Democrats hold		Swing		

=== Wallington South ===
Wallington South (3)
Party	Candidate	Votes	%	±%
Liberal Democrats	Richard Bailey	1,575	45.8	
Liberal Democrats	Colin Hall	1,550		
Liberal Democrats	Jayne McCoy	1,490		
Conservative	Owen Hanson	1,305	37.9	
Conservative	Peter Wooten	1,247		
Conservative	Hilary Wortley	1,224		
Green	Malin Andrews	339	9.9	
Labour	Clive Poge	221	6.4	
Labour	Mary Ryan	215		
Green	Karin Jashapara	210		
Labour	Joyce Smith	189		
Turnout			45.3	
Liberal Democrats hold		Swing		
Liberal Democrats hold		Swing		
Liberal Democrats hold		Swing		

=== Wandle Valley ===
Wandle Valley (3)
Party	Candidate	Votes	%	±%
Liberal Democrats	Margaret Court	1,317	55.9	
Liberal Democrats	John Drage	1,206		
Liberal Democrats	Patrick Kane	1,172		
Conservative	Patrick Jaques	538	22.8	
Conservative	Brian Moss	525		
Conservative	Charles Manton	503		
Labour	Richard Collier	501	21.3	
Labour	Edward McCauley	453		
Labour	Patricia Simons	416		
Turnout			32.7	
Liberal Democrats hold		Swing		
Liberal Democrats hold		Swing		
Liberal Democrats hold		Swing		

=== Worcester Park ===
Worcester Park (3)
Party	Candidate	Votes	%	±%
Conservative	Richard Butt	1,398	41.0	
Conservative	Stuart Gordon-Bullock	1,311		
Conservative	Helen Senior	1,306		
Liberal Democrats	Yvonne Cape	1,167	34.2	
Liberal Democrats	Leslie Coman	1,155		
Liberal Democrats	Peter Overy	1,136		
Independent	Raymond Bunce	656	19.2	
Independent	Julian Freeman	567		
Independent	Nicola Freeman	544		
Labour	Hilary Hosking	188	5.5	
Labour	Graham Hutton	187		
Labour	John Evers	176		
Turnout			44.8	
Conservative gain from Liberal Democrats		Swing		
Conservative gain from Liberal Democrats		Swing		
Conservative gain from Liberal Democrats		Swing		

=== The Wrythe ===
The Wrythe (3)
Party	Candidate	Votes	%	±%
Liberal Democrats	Susan Stears	1,436	54.3	
Liberal Democrats	Colin Stears	1,405		
Liberal Democrats	Roger Thistle	1,370		
Conservative	Derek Lockhart	867	32.8	
Conservative	Christopher Wortley	834		
Conservative	Stephen Odunton	791		
Labour	Margaret Collier	343	13.0	
Labour	Catherine Magee	337		
Labour	Margaret Hughes	335		
Turnout			36.6	
Liberal Democrats hold		Swing		
Liberal Democrats hold		Swing		
Liberal Democrats hold		Swing		
