= Neil MacFarlane =

Neil MacFarlane or Neil Macfarlane may refer to:

- Neil MacFarlane (footballer) (born 1977), Scottish professional footballer
- Neil Macfarlane (politician) (born 1936), British Conservative Party politician, Member of Parliament for Sutton and Cheam 1974–1992
