= Sutton and Cheam =

Parliamentary constituency in the United Kingdom, 1945 onwards

Coordinates: 51.362°N 0.209°W

- Borough constituency for the House of Commons
- Interactive map of boundaries from 2024
- Location within Greater London
- County: Greater London
- Electorate: 71,284 (March 2020)

Current constituency
- Created: 1945
- Member of Parliament: Luke Taylor (Liberal Democrats)
- Created from: Mid Surrey or more commonly 'Epsom' (as eastern offshoot seat)

Sutton and Cheam is a constituency (Note: A borough constituency (for the purposes of election expenses and type of returning officer)) in Greater London represented in the House of Commons of the UK Parliament since 2024 by Luke Taylor, a Liberal Democrat. (Note: As with all constituencies, the constituency elects one Member of Parliament (MP) by the first past the post system of election at least every five years.)

== Constituency profile ==
Sutton town centre

Sutton and Cheam is a constituency in Greater London in England, within the Borough of Sutton. It covers the areas of Sutton, Cheam, Belmont and part of Worcester Park.

This is a suburban constituency on the edge of Greater London, located around 10 miles (16 km) south of the centre of the capital. Sutton is a historic settlement that was traditionally a stopping point on the road between London and Brighton. It grew into a town during the 19th century upon the arrival of railways and was absorbed into London's suburban sprawl during the 20th century. Today, the area is a major retail and economic centre for Outer London. Sutton has average levels of wealth with most residents living in flats, whilst Cheam and Belmont are highly-affluent with many large detached and semi-detached properties. House prices across the constituency are generally higher than the UK average but lower than the rest of London.

Sutton and Cheam has a large population of middle-aged adults with families and low proportions of young adults and retirees. Residents have high levels of income and homeownership, and the child poverty rate is less than half the overall UK figure. They are generally well-educated and a high proportion work in the health, retail and construction sectors. The percentage of residents claiming unemployment benefits is low. White people made up 68% of the population at the 2021 census, around one-fifth of whom were of non-British origin. Asians were the largest ethnic minority group at 19%, including large communities of Indian, Chinese and Sri Lankan origin.

At the local borough council, all seats in this constituency are represented by Liberal Democrats. An estimated 51% of voters in Sutton and Cheam supported leaving the European Union in the 2016 referendum, similar to the UK-wide figure of 52%.

== Political history ==
The area's voters produced a 32.6% swing to the Liberal Party in the 1972 by-election. In the nine prior elections it only returned Conservative MPs and the Liberal candidate polled third behind Labour six times and none stood three times.

The seat is a marginal seat which has since 1970 frequently flipped between electing Conservative and Liberal/Liberal Democrat candidates. During the Conservative Government 1979–1990, the seat was won by a sufficient majority to be branded a Conservative safe seat. It was regained by the Liberal Democrats in the 1997 general election and subsequently held in the 2001, 2005 and 2010 general elections. In the 2015 general election the seat was regained by the Conservatives. In June 2016, an estimated 51.28% of local adults voting in the EU membership referendum chose to leave the European Union instead of to remain. This was matched in two January 2018 votes in Parliament by its MP.

At the 2017 general election, the incumbent Conservative MP, Paul Scully, gained an 8.3% swing which moved the seat away from the typical "marginal" band of analysis: Scully won by a 24.4% majority. Due to the secret ballot only opinion polls can determine if this rise in popularity had more to do with the campaign of the Liberal Democrat candidate and/or the Conservatives picking up votes from the non-standing party UKIP, whose withdrawal was common in 2017 nationwide, following the vote to leave the EU. UKIP had 378 candidates across the UK, 346 fewer than in 2015. Also not standing, and having lost their deposits in 2015, were two left-wing minor candidates. An 11.6% extra vote share was on hand for four parties as the candidate list fell from seven to four.

The seat had ranked from 2015 to 2017 the 39th-slimmest margin of majority, specifically in share of the vote as opposed to number of votes, among the 331 Conservative seats. Labour achieved their highest in Sutton and Cheam since 1970 but still finished third; a swing of several percentage points would have been required to make Labour the closest challengers to the Conservatives. The Conservatives finished in fourth place in the European Election 2019, trailing significantly behind the Liberal Democrats, the Brexit Party, and the Labour Party.

== Prominent members ==
Richard Sharples, the constituency's Conservative MP from 1954, was a former major in the army, and served as a Home Office Minister, before resigning his seat in 1972 to become Governor of Bermuda.

== Boundaries ==
=== Historic ===
1945–1950: The Municipal Borough of Sutton and Cheam.

Map of boundaries 2010-2024

1950–1964: as above (from 1965 becoming wards of the London Borough of Sutton but not described as such in boundary legislation itself for a time).

1964–1978: The London Borough of Sutton wards of Belmont, Cheam North, Cheam South, Cheam West, Sutton Central, Sutton East, Sutton North, Sutton North East, Sutton South, Sutton South East, Worcester Park North, and Worcester Park South.

1978–2002: The London Borough of Sutton wards of Belmont, Cheam South, Cheam West, North Cheam, Rosehill, Sutton Central, Sutton Common, Sutton East, Sutton South, Sutton West, Worcester Park North, and Worcester Park South.

2002–2024: The London Borough of Sutton wards of Belmont, Cheam, Nonsuch, Stonecot, Sutton Central, Sutton North, Sutton South, Sutton West, and Worcester Park.

=== Current ===
Further to the 2023 review of Westminster constituencies, which came into effect for the 2024 general election, the boundaries of the constituency are virtually unchanged. Taking into account the local authority boundary review which came into effect on 4 May 2022, the seat is now composed of the following London Borough of Sutton wards:

- Belmont, Cheam, North Cheam, Stonecot, Sutton Central, Sutton North, Sutton South, Sutton West & East Cheam, Worcester Park North, and Worcester Park South.

== Members of Parliament ==
| Election | Member | Party | Notes |
|---|---|---|---|
| 1945 | Sir Sidney Marshall | Conservative | Resigned 1954 |
| 1954 by-election | Richard Sharples | Conservative | Resigned 1972 |
| 1972 by-election | Graham Tope | Liberal | |
| February 1974 | Sir Neil Macfarlane | Conservative | |
| 1992 | Lady Olga Maitland | Conservative | |
| 1997 | Paul Burstow | Liberal Democrats | |
| 2015 | Paul Scully | Conservative | |
| 2024 | Luke Taylor | Liberal Democrats | |

== Elections ==
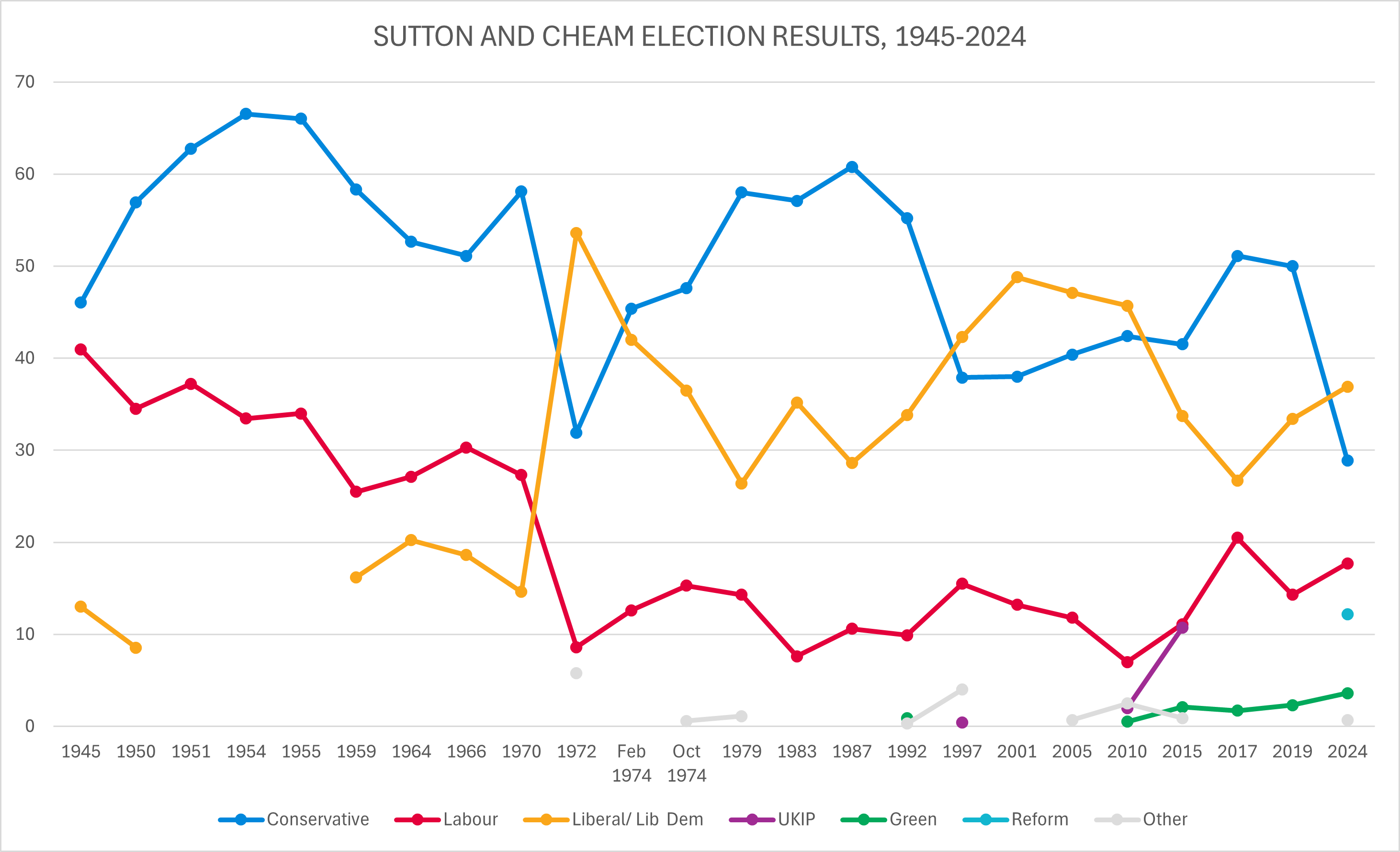
Election results 1945-2024

=== Elections in the 2020s ===
General election 2024: Sutton and Cheam
| Party | Candidate | Votes | % | ±% |
|---|---|---|---|---|
| Liberal Democrats | Luke Taylor | 17,576 | 36.9 | +3.5 |
| Conservative | Tom Drummond | 13,775 | 28.9 | −21.1 |
| Labour | Chrishni Reshekaron | 8,430 | 17.7 | +3.4 |
| Reform | Ryan Powell | 5,787 | 12.2 | N/A |
| Green | Aasha Anam | 1,721 | 3.6 | +1.3 |
| Independent | Hamilton Action-Man Kingsley | 317 | 0.7 | N/A |
| Majority | | 3,801 | 8.0 | N/A |
| Turnout | | 47,606 | 66.0 | −4.4 |
| Registered electors | | 72,303 | | |
| Liberal Democrats gain from Conservative | | Swing | +12.3 | |

=== Elections in the 2010s ===
General election 2019: Sutton and Cheam
| Party | Candidate | Votes | % | ±% |
|---|---|---|---|---|
| Conservative | Paul Scully | 25,235 | 50.0 | −1.1 |
| Liberal Democrats | Hina Bokhari | 16,884 | 33.4 | +6.7 |
| Labour | Bonnie Craven | 7,200 | 14.3 | −6.2 |
| Green | Claire Jackson-Prior | 1,168 | 2.3 | +0.6 |
| Majority | | 8,351 | 16.6 | −7.8 |
| Turnout | | 50,487 | 70.4 | −3.4 |
| Registered electors | | 71,760 | | |
| Conservative hold | | Swing | -3.9 | |

General election 2017: Sutton and Cheam
| Party | Candidate | Votes | % | ±% |
|---|---|---|---|---|
| Conservative | Paul Scully | 26,567 | 51.1 | +9.6 |
| Liberal Democrats | Amna Ahmad | 13,869 | 26.7 | −7.0 |
| Labour | Bonnie Craven | 10,663 | 20.5 | +9.4 |
| Green | Claire Jackson-Prior | 871 | 1.7 | −0.4 |
| Majority | | 12,698 | 24.4 | +16.6 |
| Turnout | | 51,970 | 73.8 | +1.7 |
| Registered electors | | 70,404 | | |
| Conservative hold | | Swing | +8.3 | |

General election 2015: Sutton and Cheam
| Party | Candidate | Votes | % | ±% |
|---|---|---|---|---|
| Conservative | Paul Scully | 20,732 | 41.5 | −0.8 |
| Liberal Democrats | Paul Burstow | 16,811 | 33.7 | −12.0 |
| Labour | Emily Brothers | 5,546 | 11.1 | +4.1 |
| UKIP | Angus Dalgleish | 5,341 | 10.7 | +8.7 |
| Green | Maeve Tomlinson | 1,051 | 2.1 | +1.6 |
| NHA | Dave Ash | 345 | 0.7 | New |
| TUSC | Pauline Gorman | 79 | 0.2 | New |
| Majority | | 3,921 | 7.8 | N/A |
| Turnout | | 49,905 | 72.1 | −0.7 |
| Registered electors | | 69,228 | | |
| Conservative gain from Liberal Democrats | | Swing | +5.6 | |

General election 2010: Sutton and Cheam
| Party | Candidate | Votes | % | ±% |
|---|---|---|---|---|
| Liberal Democrats | Paul Burstow | 22,156 | 45.7 | −1.2 |
| Conservative | Philippa Stroud | 20,548 | 42.4 | +1.7 |
| Labour | Kathy Allen | 3,376 | 7.0 | −4.9 |
| BNP | John Clarke | 1,014 | 2.1 | New |
| UKIP | David Pickles | 950 | 2.0 | New |
| Green | Peter Hickson | 246 | 0.5 | New |
| English Democrat | John Dodds | 106 | 0.2 | New |
| CPA | Matthew Connolly | 52 | 0.1 | New |
| Libertarian | Martin Cullip | 41 | 0.1 | New |
| Independents Federation UK | Brian Hammond | 19 | 0.0 | New |
| Majority | | 1,608 | 3.3 | −2.9 |
| Turnout | | 48,508 | 72.8 | +5.5 |
| Registered electors | | 66,658 | | |
| Liberal Democrats hold | | Swing | −1.5 | |

=== Elections in the 2000s ===
General election 2005: Sutton and Cheam
| Party | Candidate | Votes | % | ±% |
|---|---|---|---|---|
| Liberal Democrats | Paul Burstow | 19,768 | 47.1 | −1.7 |
| Conservative | Richard Willis | 16,922 | 40.4 | +2.4 |
| Labour | Anand Shukla | 4,954 | 11.8 | −1.4 |
| Rainbow Dream Ticket | Rainbow George Weiss | 288 | 0.7 | New |
| Majority | | 2,846 | 6.7 | −4.1 |
| Turnout | | 41,932 | 66.2 | +3.8 |
| Registered electors | | 62,885 | | |
| Liberal Democrats hold | | Swing | -2.0 | |

General election 2001: Sutton and Cheam
| Party | Candidate | Votes | % | ±% |
|---|---|---|---|---|
| Liberal Democrats | Paul Burstow | 19,382 | 48.8 | +6.5 |
| Conservative | Olga Maitland | 15,078 | 38.0 | +0.2 |
| Labour | Lisa Homan | 5,263 | 13.2 | −2.3 |
| Majority | | 4,304 | 10.8 | +6.4 |
| Turnout | | 39,723 | 62.4 | −12.5 |
| Registered electors | | 63,648 | | |
| Liberal Democrats hold | | Swing | +3.2 | |

=== Elections in the 1990s ===
General election 1997: Sutton and Cheam
| Party | Candidate | Votes | % | ±% |
|---|---|---|---|---|
| Liberal Democrats | Paul Burstow | 19,919 | 42.3 | +8.5 |
| Conservative | Olga Maitland | 17,822 | 37.9 | −17.3 |
| Labour | Mark Allison | 7,280 | 15.5 | +5.6 |
| Referendum | Peter Atkinson | 1,784 | 3.8 | New |
| UKIP | Simon Mckie | 191 | 0.4 | New |
| Natural Law | Deborah Wright | 96 | 0.2 | −0.1 |
| Majority | | 2,097 | 4.4 | N/A |
| Turnout | | 47,092 | 74.9 | −7.5 |
| Registered electors | | 62,824 | | |
| Liberal Democrats gain from Conservative | | Swing | -12.9 | |

General election 1992: Sutton and Cheam
| Party | Candidate | Votes | % | ±% |
|---|---|---|---|---|
| Conservative | Olga Maitland | 27,710 | 55.2 | −5.6 |
| Liberal Democrats | Paul Burstow | 16,954 | 33.8 | +5.2 |
| Labour | G. C. Martin | 4,980 | 9.9 | −0.7 |
| Green | J. Duffy | 444 | 0.9 | New |
| Natural Law | A. Hatchard | 133 | 0.3 | New |
| Majority | | 10,756 | 21.4 | −10.8 |
| Turnout | | 50,221 | 82.4 | +5.8 |
| Registered electors | | 60,949 | | |
| Conservative hold | | Swing | -5.4 | |

=== Elections in the 1980s ===
General election 1987: Sutton and Cheam
| Party | Candidate | Votes | % | ±% |
|---|---|---|---|---|
| Conservative | Neil Macfarlane | 29,710 | 60.8 | +3.7 |
| Liberal | Robert Greig | 13,992 | 28.6 | −6.6 |
| Labour | Loraine Monk | 5,202 | 10.6 | +3.0 |
| Majority | | 15,718 | 32.2 | +10.3 |
| Turnout | | 48,904 | 76.6 | +2.3 |
| Registered electors | | 63,850 | | |
| Conservative hold | | Swing | +5.1 | |

General election 1983: Sutton and Cheam
| Party | Candidate | Votes | % | ±% |
|---|---|---|---|---|
| Conservative | Neil Macfarlane | 26,782 | 57.1 | −0.9 |
| Liberal | Christopher Caswill | 16,518 | 35.2 | +8.8 |
| Labour | Geoffrey Dixon | 3,568 | 7.6 | −6.7 |
| Majority | | 10,264 | 21.9 | −9.7 |
| Turnout | | 46,868 | 74.3 | −4.5 |
| Registered electors | | 63,099 | | |
| Conservative hold | | Swing | -4.0 | |

=== Elections in the 1970s ===
General election 1979: Sutton and Cheam
| Party | Candidate | Votes | % | ±% |
|---|---|---|---|---|
| Conservative | Neil Macfarlane | 28,842 | 58.0 | +10.4 |
| Liberal | Christopher Caswill | 13,136 | 26.4 | −10.1 |
| Labour | Nancy Irwin | 7,126 | 14.3 | −1.0 |
| National Front | John Hunt | 465 | 0.9 | New |
| Independent | John Smoker | 128 | 0.2 | New |
| Majority | | 15,706 | 31.6 | +20.5 |
| Turnout | | 49,277 | 78.8 | +1.9 |
| Registered electors | | 63,038 | | |
| Conservative hold | | Swing | | |

General election October 1974: Sutton and Cheam
| Party | Candidate | Votes | % | ±% |
|---|---|---|---|---|
| Conservative | Neil Macfarlane | 22,156 | 47.6 | +2.2 |
| Liberal | Graham Tope | 16,995 | 36.5 | −5.5 |
| Labour | James Kenneth Rhodes | 7,118 | 15.3 | +2.7 |
| Women's Rights | Una Kroll | 298 | 0.6 | New |
| Majority | | 5,161 | 11.1 | +7.7 |
| Turnout | | 46,567 | 76.9 | −5.7 |
| Registered electors | | 60,559 | | |
| Conservative hold | | Swing | | |

General election February 1974: Sutton and Cheam
| Party | Candidate | Votes | % | ±% |
|---|---|---|---|---|
| Conservative | Neil Macfarlane | 22,555 | 45.4 | −12.7 |
| Liberal | Graham Tope | 20,836 | 42.0 | +27.4 |
| Labour | James Kenneth Rhodes | 6,270 | 12.6 | −14.7 |
| Majority | | 1,719 | 3.4 | N/A |
| Turnout | | 49,661 | 82.6 | +15.0 |
| Registered electors | | 60,109 | | |
| Conservative hold | | Swing | | |

1972 Sutton and Cheam by-election
| Party | Candidate | Votes | % | ±% |
|---|---|---|---|---|
| Liberal | Graham Tope | 18,328 | 53.6 | +39.0 |
| Conservative | Neil Macfarlane | 10,911 | 31.9 | −26.2 |
| Labour | David Miller | 2,937 | 8.6 | −18.7 |
| Anti-Common Market | Chris Frere-Smith | 1,332 | 3.9 | New |
| National Independence | Edgar Scruby | 660 | 1.9 | New |
| Majority | | 7,417 | 21.7 | N/A |
| Turnout | | 34,194 | 56.3 | −11.3 |
| Registered electors | | | | |
| Liberal gain from Conservative | | Swing | +32.6 | |

General election 1970: Sutton and Cheam
| Party | Candidate | Votes | % | ±% |
|---|---|---|---|---|
| Conservative | Richard Sharples | 23,957 | 58.1 | +7.00 |
| Labour | John Dowsett | 11,261 | 27.3 | −2.99 |
| Liberal | Nicholas DM McGeorge | 6,023 | 14.6 | −4.01 |
| Majority | | 12,696 | 30.8 | +9.99 |
| Turnout | | 41,241 | 67.6 | −8.76 |
| Registered electors | | 61,050 | | |
| Conservative hold | | Swing | | |

=== Elections in the 1960s ===
General election 1966: Sutton and Cheam
| Party | Candidate | Votes | % | ±% |
|---|---|---|---|---|
| Conservative | Richard Sharples | 22,331 | 51.10 | −1.55 |
| Labour | Frank J Ward | 13,235 | 30.29 | +3.16 |
| Liberal | Nicholas DM McGeorge | 8,134 | 18.61 | −1.62 |
| Majority | | 9,096 | 20.81 | −4.71 |
| Turnout | | 43,700 | 76.36 | +2.09 |
| Registered electors | | 57,227 | | |
| Conservative hold | | Swing | | |

General election 1964: Sutton and Cheam
| Party | Candidate | Votes | % | ±% |
|---|---|---|---|---|
| Conservative | Richard Sharples | 22,975 | 52.65 | −5.67 |
| Labour | Paul Derrick | 11,839 | 27.13 | +1.65 |
| Liberal | John Montgomerie | 8,827 | 20.23 | +4.02 |
| Majority | | 11,136 | 25.52 | −7.32 |
| Turnout | | 43,641 | 74.27 | −5.34 |
| Registered electors | | 58,898 | | |
| Conservative hold | | Swing | | |

=== Elections in the 1950s ===
General election 1959: Sutton and Cheam
| Party | Candidate | Votes | % | ±% |
|---|---|---|---|---|
| Conservative | Richard Sharples | 27,344 | 58.32 | −7.70 |
| Labour | Frank Judd | 11,946 | 25.48 | −8.50 |
| Liberal | John Montgomerie | 7,600 | 16.21 | New |
| Majority | | 15,398 | 32.84 | +0.81 |
| Turnout | | 46,890 | 79.61 | +3.16 |
| Registered electors | | 58,763 | | |
| Conservative hold | | Swing | | |

General election 1955: Sutton and Cheam
| Party | Candidate | Votes | % | ±% |
|---|---|---|---|---|
| Conservative | Richard Sharples | 29,538 | 66.02 | +3.25 |
| Labour | Ronald M Lewis | 15,205 | 33.98 | −3.25 |
| Majority | | 14,333 | 32.04 | +6.51 |
| Turnout | | 44,743 | 76.45 | −5.23 |
| Registered electors | | 58,529 | | |
| Conservative hold | | Swing | | |

1954 Sutton and Cheam by-election
| Party | Candidate | Votes | % | ±% |
|---|---|---|---|---|
| Conservative | Richard Sharples | 21,930 | 66.55 | +3.78 |
| Labour | N. T. Poulter | 11,023 | 33.45 | −3.78 |
| Majority | | 10,907 | 33.10 | +7.57 |
| Turnout | | 32,953 | 55.60 | −26.08 |
| Registered electors | | 59,292 | | |
| Conservative hold | | Swing | | |

General election 1951: Sutton and Cheam
| Party | Candidate | Votes | % | ±% |
|---|---|---|---|---|
| Conservative | Sidney Marshall | 30,684 | 62.77 | +5.84 |
| Labour | Eric KI Hurst | 18,202 | 37.23 | +2.71 |
| Majority | | 12,482 | 25.54 | +3.13 |
| Turnout | | 58,886 | 81.68 | −5.05 |
| Registered electors | | 59,848 | | |
| Conservative hold | | Swing | | |

General election 1950: Sutton and Cheam
| Party | Candidate | Votes | % | ±% |
|---|---|---|---|---|
| Conservative | Sidney Marshall | 29,200 | 56.93 | +10.89 |
| Labour | Helen O. Judd | 17,706 | 34.52 | −6.45 |
| Liberal | Henry Joseph Wheeler | 4,389 | 8.56 | −4.45 |
| Majority | | 11,494 | 22.41 | +17.34 |
| Turnout | | 51,295 | 86.73 | +11.01 |
| Registered electors | | 59,141 | | |
| Conservative hold | | Swing | | |

=== Elections in the 1940s ===
General election 1945: Sutton and Cheam
| Party | Candidate | Votes | % | ±% |
|---|---|---|---|---|
| Conservative | Sidney Marshall | 19,431 | 46.04 | |
| Labour | Helen O. Judd | 17,293 | 40.97 | |
| Liberal | John Pickering Hughes | 5,483 | 12.99 | |
| Majority | | 2,138 | 5.07 | |
| Turnout | | 42,207 | 75.72 | |
| Registered electors | | 55,742 | | |
| Conservative win (new seat) | | | | |

== See also ==
- List of parliamentary constituencies in London
