= Sidney Marshall =

British businessman and politician (1882–1973)

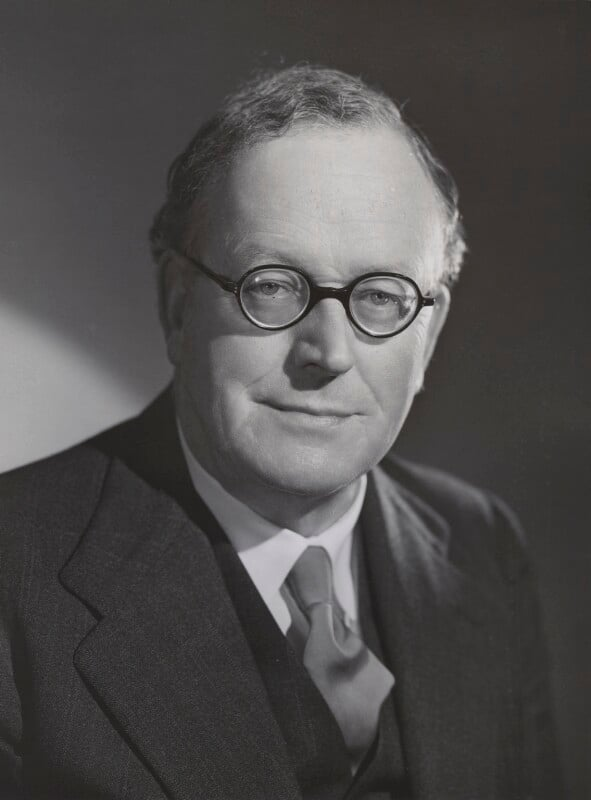
Marshall in 1950

Sir Sidney Horatio Marshall (17 July 1882 – 28 March 1973) was a British businessman and politician. Born in Mitcham, he was Conservative Party Member of Parliament (MP) for Sutton and Cheam from 1945 to 1954. Furthermore, he was charter mayor when Sutton and Cheam was incorporated as a municipal borough in 1934, and served as its mayor again in 1936–37 and was a member of the Surrey County Council from 1931, before serving as chairman thereof from 1947 to 1950.

Parliament of the United Kingdom
New constituency	Member of Parliament for Sutton and Cheam; 1945 – 1954	Succeeded by Richard Sharples
