= 2010 Sutton London Borough Council election =

2010 local election in England

Map of the results of the 2010 Sutton council election. Conservatives in blue and Liberal Democrats in yellow.

Elections for London Borough of Sutton were held on 6 May 2010. The 2010 General Election and other local elections took place on the same day.

In London council elections the entire council is elected every four years, opposed to some local elections where one councillor is elected every year for three of the four years.

== Results ==
Sutton Council election result 2010
Party	Seats	Gains	Losses	Net gain/loss	Seats %	Votes %	Votes	+/−
Liberal Democrats	43			+11				
Conservative	11			-11				
Labour	0			0				
Green	0	0	0	0				

== Ward Results ==
=== Beddington North ===
Beddington North
Party	Candidate	Votes	%	±%
Liberal Democrats	John Keys	2,456	45.5	
Liberal Democrats	Pathumal Ali	2,318	42.9	
Liberal Democrats	John Leach	2,306	42.7	
Conservative	Matthew Drew	1,992	36.9	
Conservative	Julia Russell	1,787	33.1	
Conservative	Stephen Odunton	1,567	29.0	
Labour	Sarah Gwynn	671	12.4	
Labour	Nawaz Ahmed	593	11.0	
Labour	Susan Theobald	519	9.6	
Green	Joanna Burningham	376	7.0	
Turnout		5,397	70.6	
Liberal Democrats hold		Swing		
Liberal Democrats hold		Swing		
Liberal Democrats hold		Swing		

=== Beddington South ===
Beddington South
Party	Candidate	Votes	%	±%
Liberal Democrats	Edward Joyce	2,250	43.7	
Liberal Democrats	Joyce Melican	2,122	41.3	
Conservative	Malcolm Brown	2,120	41.2	
Conservative	Terry Hagerty	2,002	38.9	
Conservative	Peter Wallis	1,965	38.2	
Liberal Democrats	Muhammad Sadiq	1,871	36.4	
Labour	Edward McCauley	618	12.0	
Labour	Clive Poge	564	11.0	
Labour	Jas Weir	459	8.9	
Green	Richard Griffiths	277	5.4	
Turnout		5,144	66.9	
Liberal Democrats gain from Conservative		Swing		
Liberal Democrats gain from Conservative		Swing		
Conservative hold		Swing		

=== Belmont ===
Belmont
Party	Candidate	Votes	%	±%
Conservative	David Hicks	2,629	46.9	
Conservative	Peter Geringer	2,544	45.4	
Conservative	Pamela Picknett	2,355	42.0	
Liberal Democrats	Abigail Lock	2,210	39.4	
Liberal Democrats	Russel Neale	2,087	37.2	
Liberal Democrats	Eric Pridham	1,785	31.8	
UKIP	David Pickles	621	11.1	
Labour	Gale Blears	519	9.3	
Labour	Geraldine Kerr	412	7.4	
Labour	Marian Wingrove	343	6.1	
Turnout		5,605	74.8	
Conservative hold		Swing		
Conservative hold		Swing		
Conservative hold		Swing		

=== Carshalton Central ===
Carshalton Central
Party	Candidate	Votes	%	±%
Liberal Democrats	Hamish Pollock	2,676	48.2	
Liberal Democrats	Alan Salter	2,488	44.8	
Liberal Democrats	Jill Whitehead	2,377	42.8	
Conservative	Paul Scully	2,062	37.2	
Conservative	Paul Kelly	2,033	36.6	
Conservative	Jemany Hameed	1,724	31.1	
Labour	David Davis	528	9.5	
Labour	David Towler	419	7.6	
Labour	Aboo Koheeallee	397	7.2	
Green	Robert Steel	388	7.0	
Green	Brian Dougherty	305	5.5	
Green	Mandi Suheimat	208	3.7	
Turnout		5,549	75.1	
Liberal Democrats hold		Swing		
Liberal Democrats gain from Conservative		Swing		
Liberal Democrats gain from Conservative		Swing		

=== Carshalton South & Clockhouse ===
Carshalton South & Clockhouse
Party	Candidate	Votes	%	±%
Conservative	Timothy Crowley	2,469	44.2	
Liberal Democrats	Peter Fosdike	2,400	42.9	
Conservative	Moira Butt	2,369	42.4	
Conservative	John Kennedy	2,362	42.3	
Liberal Democrats	John Leeson	2,237	40.0	
Liberal Democrats	Paul Wingrove	2,203	39.4	
Labour	Claire Shearer	502	9.0	
Labour	Marilynne Burbage	498	8.9	
Labour	Peter Turner	431	7.7	
CPA	Ashley Dickenson	178	3.2	
Turnout		5,589	76.0	
Conservative hold		Swing		
Liberal Democrats gain from Conservative		Swing		
Conservative hold		Swing		

=== Cheam ===
Cheam
Party	Candidate	Votes	%	±%
Liberal Democrats	Mary Burstow	2,988	50.4	
Conservative	Jonathon Pritchard	2,751	46.4	
Conservative	Graham Whitham	2,662	44.9	
Conservative	Misdaq Zaidi	2,445	41.2	
Liberal Democrats	Anthony Young	2,289	38.6	
Liberal Democrats	Neil Frater	1,960	33.1	
Labour	Jane Rodger	268	4.5	
Labour	Lyndon Edwards	263	4.4	
Labour	Ameya Kirtane	229	3.9	
CPA	Matthew Connolly	182	3.1	
Turnout		5,929	76.4	
Liberal Democrats gain from Conservative		Swing		
Conservative hold		Swing		
Conservative hold		Swing		

=== Nonsuch ===
Nonsuch
Party	Candidate	Votes	%	±%
Liberal Democrats	Gerry Jerome	2,781	46.8	
Liberal Democrats	Kirsty Jerome	2,675	45.0	
Conservative	Eric Allen	2,568	43.2	
Liberal Democrats	Roger Roberts	2,531	42.6	
Conservative	Alan Plant	2,476	41.6	
Conservative	Richard Butt	2,400	40.3	
Labour	Kathie Clark	376	6.3	
Labour	Shawn Buck	354	6.0	
Labour	Marcus Papadopoulos	335	5.6	
Turnout		5,948	74.1	
Liberal Democrats hold		Swing		
Liberal Democrats hold		Swing		
Conservative hold		Swing		

=== St. Helier ===
St. Helier
Party	Candidate	Votes	%	±%
Liberal Democrats	Sheila Andrews	2,319	51.7	
Liberal Democrats	David Callaghan	2,136	47.7	
Liberal Democrats	Anisha Callaghan	2,003	44.7	
Conservative	Keith Martin	963	21.5	
Conservative	Charles Manton	947	21.1	
Labour	Margaret Hughes	783	17.5	
Conservative	Eric Pillinger	755	16.8	
Labour	Patrick Sim	740	16.5	
Labour	Arran Stears	728	16.2	
BNP	Peter North	549	12.2	
UKIP	Frank Day	537	12.0	
Turnout		4,482	57.8	
Liberal Democrats hold		Swing		
Liberal Democrats hold		Swing		
Liberal Democrats hold		Swing		

=== Stonecot ===
Stonecot
Party	Candidate	Votes	%	±%
Liberal Democrats	Adrian Davey	3,023	53.6	
Liberal Democrats	Brendan Hudson	2,664	47.2	
Liberal Democrats	Miguel Javelot	2,508	44.5	
Conservative	Chris Noon	1,814	32.2	
Conservative	Eliza Philippidis	1,801	31.9	
Conservative	Henry Jamieson	1,774	31.5	
Labour	James Brickley	632	11.2	
Labour	Victoria Irvine	490	8.7	
Labour	William Lang	459	8.1	
BNP	George Hadwin	413	7.3	
Turnout		5,640	71.3	
Liberal Democrats hold		Swing		
Liberal Democrats hold		Swing		
Liberal Democrats hold		Swing		

=== Sutton Central ===
Sutton Central
Party	Candidate	Votes	%	±%
Liberal Democrats	Sean Brennan	2,660	55.5	
Liberal Democrats	Janet Lowne	2,275	47.5	
Liberal Democrats	Graham Tope	2,160	45.1	
Conservative	Alexandra Churchill	1,393	29.1	
Conservative	Andrew Pearce	1,326	27.7	
Conservative	Uday Kalangi	1,060	22.1	
Labour	Kathleen Allen	804	16.8	
Labour	Charlie Mansell	544	11.4	
Labour	Vic Paulino	456	9.5	
Green	Simon Honey	419	8.7	
Turnout		4,789	64.7	
Liberal Democrats hold		Swing		
Liberal Democrats hold		Swing		
Liberal Democrats hold		Swing		

=== Sutton North ===
Sutton North
Party	Candidate	Votes	%	±%
Liberal Democrats	Ruth Dombey	2,749	52.9	
Liberal Democrats	Marlene Heron	2,578	49.6	
Liberal Democrats	Lester Holloway	2,479	47.7	
Conservative	Mark Bundle	1,765	33.9	
Conservative	Clifford Carter	1,760	33.8	
Conservative	Damian Merciar	1,558	30.0	
Labour	Emily Brothers	545	10.5	
Labour	Matthew Marlow	439	8.4	
Labour	Stephen Morton	383	7.4	
Turnout		5,200	69.5	
Liberal Democrats hold		Swing		
Liberal Democrats hold		Swing		
Liberal Democrats gain from Conservative		Swing		

=== Sutton South ===
Sutton South
Party	Candidate	Votes	%	±%
Liberal Democrats	Richard Clifton	2,218	45.4	
Liberal Democrats	Heather Honour	2,169	44.4	
Conservative	Tony Shields	2,059	42.1	
Liberal Democrats	Peter Honour	1,990	40.7	
Conservative	Paul Newman	1,929	39.5	
Conservative	Barry Russell	1,915	39.2	
Labour	Steve Blears	487	10.0	
Labour	Ronald Phillips	419	8.6	
Labour	Maria Ponto	382	7.8	
UKIP	Adrian Noble	270	5.5	
Turnout		4,886	69.0	
Liberal Democrats gain from Conservative		Swing		
Liberal Democrats gain from Conservative		Swing		
Conservative hold		Swing		

=== Sutton West ===
Sutton West
Party	Candidate	Votes	%	±%
Liberal Democrats	Wendy Mathys	2,640	48.1	
Liberal Democrats	Simon Wales	2,614	47.7	
Liberal Democrats	Myfanwy Wallace	2,568	46.8	
Conservative	Charlie Cornwell	1,963	35.8	
Conservative	Mary Edwards	1,939	35.4	
Conservative	Avi Shirodkar	1,678	30.6	
Labour	Michael Cue	487	8.9	
Labour	Kevin Lynch	433	7.9	
Labour	Ronald Williams	396	7.2	
Green	Jose Hickson	232	4.2	
Green	Eric Hickson	223	4.1	
Green	Peter Hickson	192	3.5	
Turnout		5,483	70.5	
Liberal Democrats hold		Swing		
Liberal Democrats hold		Swing		
Liberal Democrats hold		Swing		

=== The Wrythe ===
The Wrythe
Party	Candidate	Votes	%	±%
Liberal Democrats	Colin Stears	2,566	50.5	
Liberal Democrats	Susan Stears	2,491	49.0	
Liberal Democrats	Roger Thistle	2,229	43.9	
Conservative	Samantha Drew	1,511	29.7	
Conservative	Terence Faulds	1,432	28.2	
Conservative	Jim Simms	1,329	26.2	
Labour	Pat Simons	585	11.5	
Labour	Sean Hayward	570	11.2	
Labour	Andrew Theobald	562	11.1	
BNP	Sarah Bristow	451	8.9	
Green	Andrew Lindsay	377	7.4	
Turnout		5,081	66.8	
Liberal Democrats hold		Swing		
Liberal Democrats hold		Swing		
Liberal Democrats hold		Swing		

=== Wallington North ===
Wallington North
Party	Candidate	Votes	%	±%
Liberal Democrats	Bruce Glithero	2,658	48.4	
Liberal Democrats	Sunita Gordon	2,481	45.2	
Liberal Democrats	Stanley Thead	2,031	37.0	
Conservative	Neil Garratt	1,801	32.8	
Conservative	Eric Howell	1,785	32.5	
Conservative	Jason Hughes	1,573	28.7	
UKIP	Phil Elliott	629	11.5	
Labour	Kathleen Reeds	566	10.3	
Labour	Patrick Ford	529	9.6	
Labour	Alan Tate	497	9.1	
Green	George Dow	410	7.5	
Green	Penelope Mouncey	291	5.3	
Green	Phillip Mouncey	189	3.4	
Turnout		5,490	71.0	
Liberal Democrats hold		Swing		
Liberal Democrats hold		Swing		
Liberal Democrats hold		Swing		

=== Wallington South ===
Wallington South
Party	Candidate	Votes	%	±%
Liberal Democrats	Monica Coleman	2,674	49.2	
Liberal Democrats	Colin Hall	2,633	48.5	
Liberal Democrats	Jayne McCoy	2,439	44.9	
Conservative	Marion Williams	1,891	34.8	
Conservative	Christopher Wortley	1,839	33.9	
Conservative	Hilary Wortley	1,684	31.0	
Labour	Joseph Magee	559	10.3	
Green	Malin Andrews	544	10.0	
Labour	Mary Ryan	542	10.0	
Labour	David Theobald	455	8.4	
Turnout		5,432	70.8	
Liberal Democrats hold		Swing		
Liberal Democrats hold		Swing		
Liberal Democrats hold		Swing		

=== Wandle Valley ===
Wandle Valley
Party	Candidate	Votes	%	±%
Liberal Democrats	Margaret Court	2,303	50.6	
Liberal Democrats	Patrick Kane	2,130	46.8	
Liberal Democrats	John Drage	2,128	46.8	
Conservative	James England	1,152	25.3	
Conservative	Patrick Jacques	932	20.5	
Conservative	Alan Oliver	923	20.3	
Labour	Richard Collier	786	17.3	
Labour	Margaret Onians	688	15.1	
Labour	Tony Thorpe	664	14.6	
BNP	Margaret Williams	445	9.8	
Green	Derek Coleman	348	7.7	
Green	Anna Francis	248	5.5	
Turnout		4,548	60.1	
Liberal Democrats hold		Swing		
Liberal Democrats hold		Swing		
Liberal Democrats hold		Swing		

=== Worcester Park ===
Worcester Park
Party	Candidate	Votes	%	±%
Liberal Democrats	Jennifer Campbell-Klomps	2,739	45.8	
Conservative	Stuart Gordon-Bullock	2,309	38.6	
Liberal Democrats	Stephen Fenwick	2,291	38.3	
Conservative	Marie Grant	2,287	38.3	
Liberal Democrats	Jason Hunter	2,269	38.0	
Conservative	Alan Swinton	2,229	37.3	
Labour	John Evers	585	9.8	
Labour	David Hosking	542	9.1	
UKIP	Chris Day	534	8.9	
Labour	Hilary Hosking	507	8.5	
Turnout		5,977	71.6	
Liberal Democrats gain from Conservative		Swing		
Conservative hold		Swing		
Liberal Democrats gain from Conservative		Swing		
