= 1954 Sutton and Cheam by-election =

UK Parliamentary by-election

The 1954 Sutton and Cheam by-election was held on 4 November 1954 due to the resignation of the Conservative MP Sydney Marshall. The seat was retained by the Conservative candidate Richard Sharples.

Sutton and Cheam by-election, 1954
Party	Candidate	Votes	%	±%
Conservative	Richard Sharples	21,930	66.55	+3.78
Labour	N. T. Poulter	11,023	33.45	−3.78
Majority		10,907	33.10	+7.57
Turnout		32,953	55.60	−26.08
Registered electors		59,292		
Conservative hold		Swing		
