= 1972 Sutton and Cheam by-election =

1972 UK Parliamentary by-election

← 1970	7 December 1972	1974 →

Constituency of Sutton and Cheam
- Turnout: 56.3% (▼11.3%)
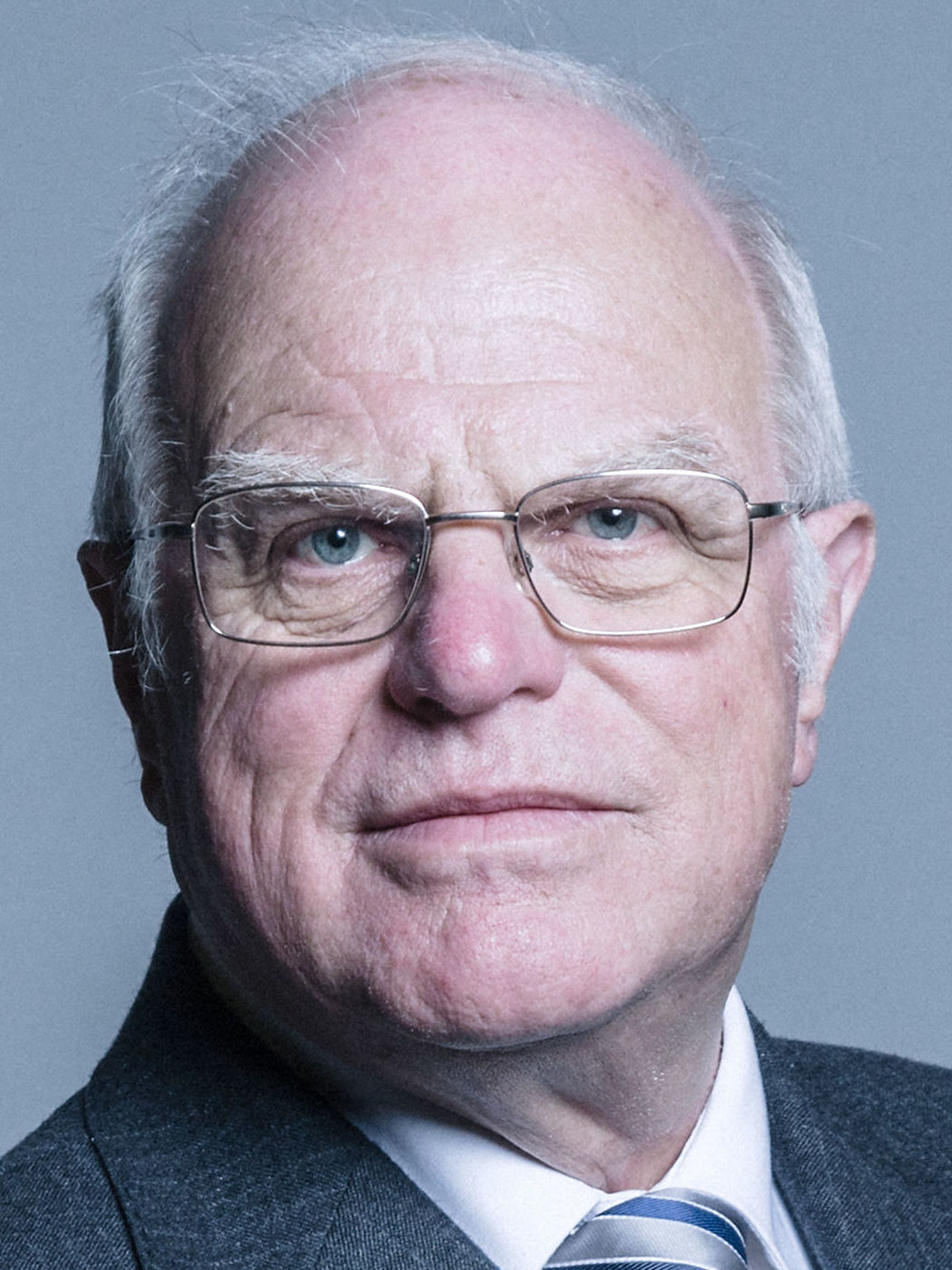

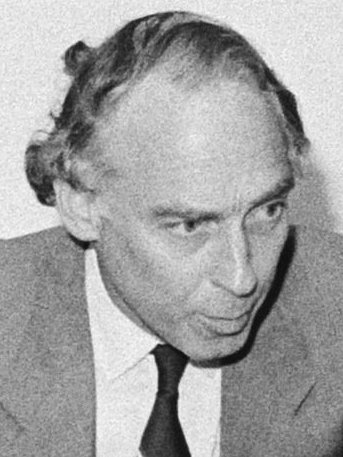
	First party	Second party	Third party
			Lab
Candidate	Graham Tope	Neil Macfarlane	David Miller
Party	Liberal	Conservative	Labour
Popular vote	18,328	10,911	2,937
Percentage	53.6%	31.9%	8.6%
Swing	▲39.0%	▼26.2%	▼18.7%
MP before election
Richard Sharples
Conservative
Elected MP
Graham Tope
Liberal

The 1972 Sutton and Cheam by-election of 7 December 1972 was held after Conservative Member of Parliament (MP) Richard Sharples was appointed Governor of Bermuda. In a defeat for Edward Heath's government the seat was won by Liberal candidate Graham Tope, who defeated the Conservative candidate Neil Macfarlane. This was the second Liberal gain during the 1970–1974 Parliament, during which they gained five seats overall. Tope went on to lose the seat to Macfarlane at the February 1974 election.

== Result ==
1972 Sutton and Cheam by-election
Party	Candidate	Votes	%	±%
Liberal	Graham Tope	18,328	53.6	+39.0
Conservative	Neil Macfarlane	10,911	31.9	−26.2
Labour	David Miller	2,937	8.6	−18.7
Anti-Common Market	Chris Frere-Smith	1,332	3.9	New
National Independence	Edgar Scruby	660	1.9	New
Majority		7,417	21.7	N/A
Turnout		34,194	56.3	−11.3
Registered electors				
Liberal gain from Conservative		Swing	+32.6	
