= Richard Sharples =

British politician and Governor of Bermuda (1916 - 1973)

Lieutenant-Colonel Sir Richard Sharples KCMG OBE MC
- Richard Sharples in 1959

Governor of Bermuda
- In office 1972 – 10 March 1973
- Monarch: Elizabeth II
- Preceded by: Lord Martonmere
- Succeeded by: Sir Edwin Leather

Member of Parliament for Sutton and Cheam
- In office 4 November 1954 – 31 October 1972
- Preceded by: Sydney Marshall
- Succeeded by: Graham Tope

Personal details
- Born: 6 August 1916 England
- Died: 10 March 1973 (aged 56) Hamilton, Bermuda
- Cause of death: Assassination by gunshot
- Resting place: St. Peter's Church, St. George's
- Spouse: Pamela Newall (m. 1946)
- Children: 4
- Education: Royal Military College, Sandhurst

Military service
- Allegiance: United Kingdom
- Branch/service: British Army
- Years of service: 1936-1953
- Rank: Lieutenant colonel
- Unit: Welsh Guards
- Battles/wars: Second World War

Sir Richard Christopher Sharples, KCMG, OBE, MC (6 August 1916 – 10 March 1973) was a British politician. He served as a Governor of Bermuda in 1972 until his assassination in 1973 by assailants who were linked to a small militant Bermudian Black Power group called the Black Beret Cadre. The former army major, who had been a junior minister, resigned his seat to take up the position of Governor of Bermuda in late 1972. His murder resulted in the last executions conducted under British rule, in 1977.

== Career ==
Sharples passed out from the Royal Military College, Sandhurst, in 1936 and was commissioned into the Welsh Guards. During the Second World War he served in France and Italy. He rose to the rank of lieutenant colonel and left the army in 1953. He married Pamela Newall in 1946; they had two sons and two daughters. The family greatly enjoyed yachting, and this was the basis of a close friendship with Edward Heath, later prime minister. Sharples was elected Conservative Member of Parliament for Sutton and Cheam in a 1954 by‑election. After the 1970 general election, he served as Minister of State at the Home Office, before resigning his seat in 1972 to take up the position of Governor of Bermuda. He was assassinated in 1973 by a faction associating itself with the Black Power movement.

His widow was subsequently made a life peer as Baroness Sharples.

== Death ==
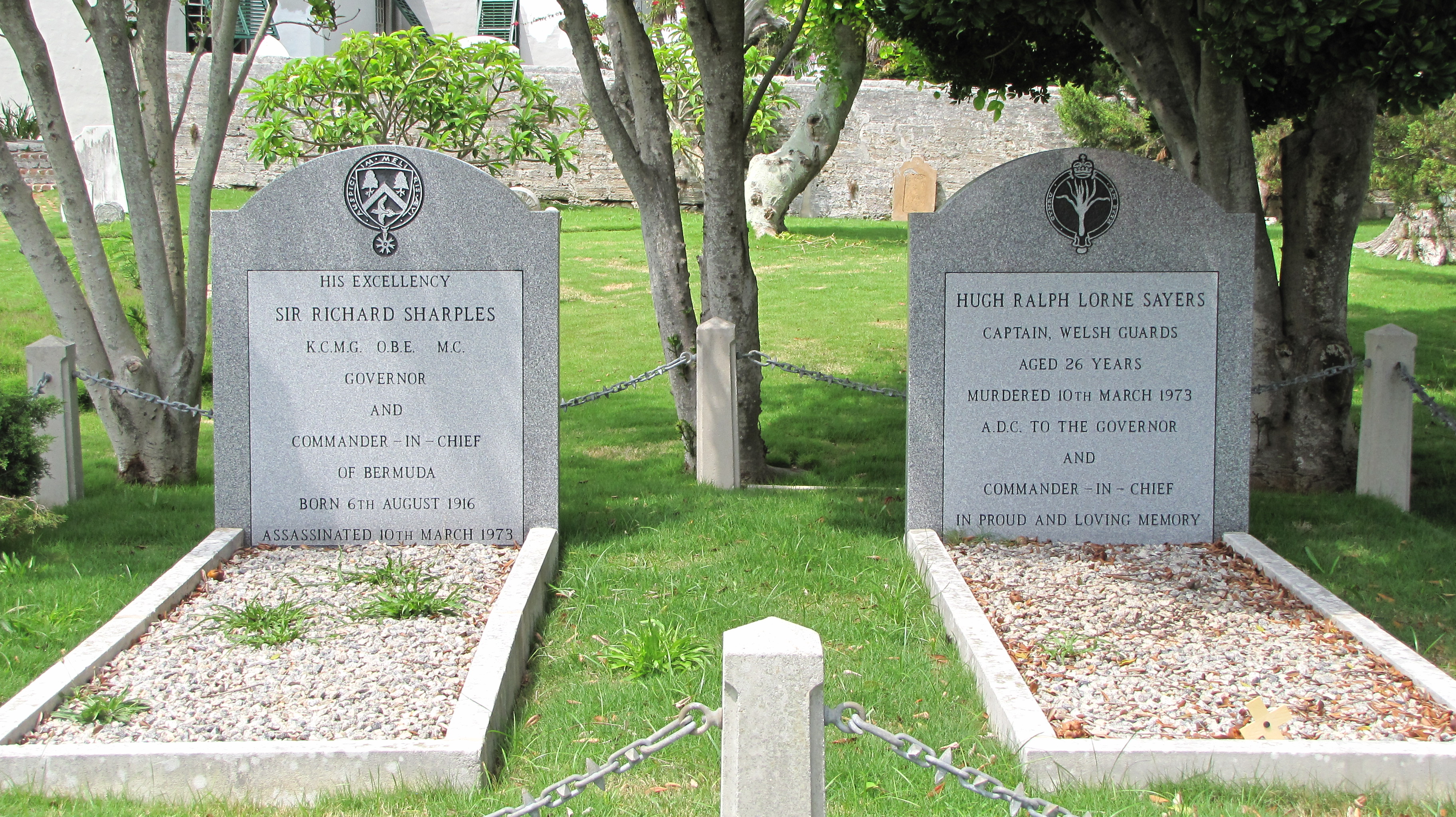
The graves of Sharples and Sayers in the cemetery of St Peter's Church

Sharples was killed outside Bermuda's Government House on 10 March 1973. An informal dinner party for a small group of guests had just concluded, when he decided to go for a walk with his Great Dane, Horsa, and his aide-de-camp, Captain Hugh Sayers of the Welsh Guards. The two men and dog were ambushed and gunned down outside the Governor's residence.

=== Aftermath ===
The Governor's coffin was borne by officers of the Bermuda Regiment, and Sayers' by a party from the Welsh Guards. The coffins were carried atop 25-pounder field guns of the Bermuda Regiment, to the Leander-class frigate HMS Sirius, which was stationed at HM Dockyard Bermuda at the time. The ship's Royal Marines detachment provided an honour guard on the flight deck. HMS Sirius conveyed the bodies from Hamilton to St. George's, where they were interred at St. Peter's Church. After the assassination HMS Sirius provided enhanced security for Commodore Cameron Rusby, the Senior Naval Officer West Indies (SNOWI) who was stationed on the island. A detachment of Royal Marines (subsequently replaced by soldiers from the Parachute Regiment) was posted to the Dockyard to guard SNOWI.

Sharples was buried in the graveyard at St Peter's Church in St George's on 16 March 1973, six days after his assassination, with Captain Sayers and Great Dane, Horsa.

Elements of the British Army's airborne forces, which were training at Warwick Camp with the Bermuda Regiment at the time of the murders, were called in to assist the civil authorities. The 23 Parachute Field Ambulance, 1 Parachute Logistic Regiment and the band of the 1st Battalion, The Parachute Regiment subsequently provided protection for government buildings, officials and dignitaries as well as assisting the Bermuda Police.

=== Search, arrests, and sentence ===
Following a police search in 1976, Erskine Durrant "Buck" Burrows and Larry Tacklyn, who had ties to a Black Power group known as the Black Beret Cadre, were arrested. Shortly before his arrest, Burrows committed a $28,000 bank robbery. Burrows confessed to shooting and killing Sharples and Sayers. Burrows was convicted of killing Sharples, Sayers, Bermuda Police commissioner George Duckett on 9 September 1972, and the co-owner and the bookkeeper of a supermarket, Victor Rego and Mark Doe on 6 April 1973. He was sentenced to death.

In his confession Burrows wrote:

"I, Erskine Durrant Burrows, as former Commander in Chief of all anticolonialist forces in the island of Bermuda, wish to willingly reveal the part I played in the assassination and murder of the former Governor of Bermuda Mr. Richard Sharples and his ADC Captain Hugh Sayers. I wish to state, not forgetting that killing is wrong and sinful, that it was upon my direct orders and inspired efforts and determination, that what was done was done, performed with a magnum .357 six-shot hand-gun. I was not alone when I went up to Government House to kill the Governor, but I shall never reveal who or how many others were with me."

"The motive for killing the Governor … was to seek to make the people, Black people in particular, become aware of the evilness and wickedness in this island of Bermuda. One of their major evil strategies being to seek and encourage the Black people to hate and fight each other, while those who are putting this evil strategy into effect laugh and pat themselves on their backs saying, yeah look, we have got them, we have got them conquered. Secondly the motive was to show that these colonialists were just ordinary people like ourselves who eat, sleep and die just like anybody else and that we need not stand in fear or awe of them."

"Finally the motive was to reveal Black people to themselves. This refers to the revealed reactions of many Black people during the Governor's funeral, when Black people were … standing with tears in their eyes crying for a man who when he was alive didn't care if they lived or died and here they were crying for a White Governor and yet when many of their own people pass away there is sometimes hardly a tear shed for them. This shows clearly the evil effects that the colonialist propaganda has had over the long years they have ruled over this little island. And my beloved brothers and sisters this ought not to be because there is a supreme authority we can all appeal to and pray to free us from suppression, sin and any evil domination we might be under…"

Tacklyn was acquitted of assassinating Sharples and Sayers but was convicted of killing Victor Rego and Mark Doe at the Shopping Centre supermarket in April 1973. Unlike Burrows, who did not care whether he was to be executed, Tacklyn expected to get a "last minute" reprieve.

Both murderers remained in Casemates Prison while the appeals process for Tacklyn was brought before the Privy Council in London. During this time, it was reported that Tacklyn passed the time playing table tennis, while Burrows took a virtual vow of silence, only communicating his thoughts and requests on scraps of paper.

=== Execution ===
Both men were hanged on 2 December 1977 at Casemates Prison. A moratorium on hanging was then in effect and while others had been sentenced to death in the intervening years, no one had been executed in Bermuda since the Second World War. Burrows and Tacklyn were the last people executed anywhere in the British realm. The last hangings in the British Isles had occurred in 1964, while the last death sentence was passed on the Isle of Man in 1992. This sentence was eventually quashed and replaced by life imprisonment following retrial in 1994. Meanwhile, the death penalty in the Isle of Man had been abolished in 1993.

Since nobody in Bermuda had any experience with carrying out an execution, a hangman had to be flown over from Canada, which had carried out its the last executions in 1962.

==== Riots ====
Three days of rioting followed the executions. During the riots, the Bermuda Regiment proved too small to fulfil its role (which was considered by Major General Glyn Gilbert, the highest ranking Bermudian in the British Army, in his review of the regiment, leading to its increase from 400 soldiers to a full battalion of 750). As a consequence, at the request of the Bermuda Government, soldiers of the 1st Battalion the Royal Regiment of Fusiliers were flown in as reinforcements in the aftermath of the riots. The cost of the damages was estimated to be $2 million.

== Aftermath ==
In 2013, Mel Ayton wrote Justice Denied - Bermuda's Black Militants, the Third Man, and the Assassinations of a Police Chief and Governor, in which he argued that a third man had been involved in the murder of Sharples, but was never prosecuted. The "third man" was described as the most violent member of the Berets and a leader of a more militant faction of the group. He advocated for the elimination of the island's political leaders and the institution of a "revolutionary Marxist government."

== Honours and decorations ==
On 20 December 1940 Sharples was awarded the Military Cross (MC) for "gallant conduct in action with the enemy". In 1945, he was mentioned in dispatches for services in Italy. In 1946, he was awarded the Silver Star, the United States Armed Forces third-highest military decoration for valor in combat. He was appointed an Officer of the Order of the British Empire (OBE) in the 1953 Coronation Honours List.

In 1972 Sharples was knighted as a Knight Commander of the Order of St Michael and St George following his appointment as Governor of Bermuda.

On 4 July 2025 Sharples was awarded the Elizabeth Emblem.

== Sources ==
The Ottawa Citizen, 11 March 1973,**as first reported.**

- The Black Panthers: Their Dangerous Bermudian Legacy

The Black Panthers: Their Dangerous Bermudian Legacy, Mel Ayton 2006.

Parliament of the United Kingdom
Preceded by Sydney Marshall	Member of Parliament for Sutton and Cheam; 1954–1972	Succeeded by Graham Tope
Political offices
Preceded by Lord Martonmere	Governor of Bermuda; 1972–1973	Succeeded by Sir Edwin Leather
