= Angus Dalgleish =

British oncologist

Angus Dalgleish FMedSci FRCP FRACP
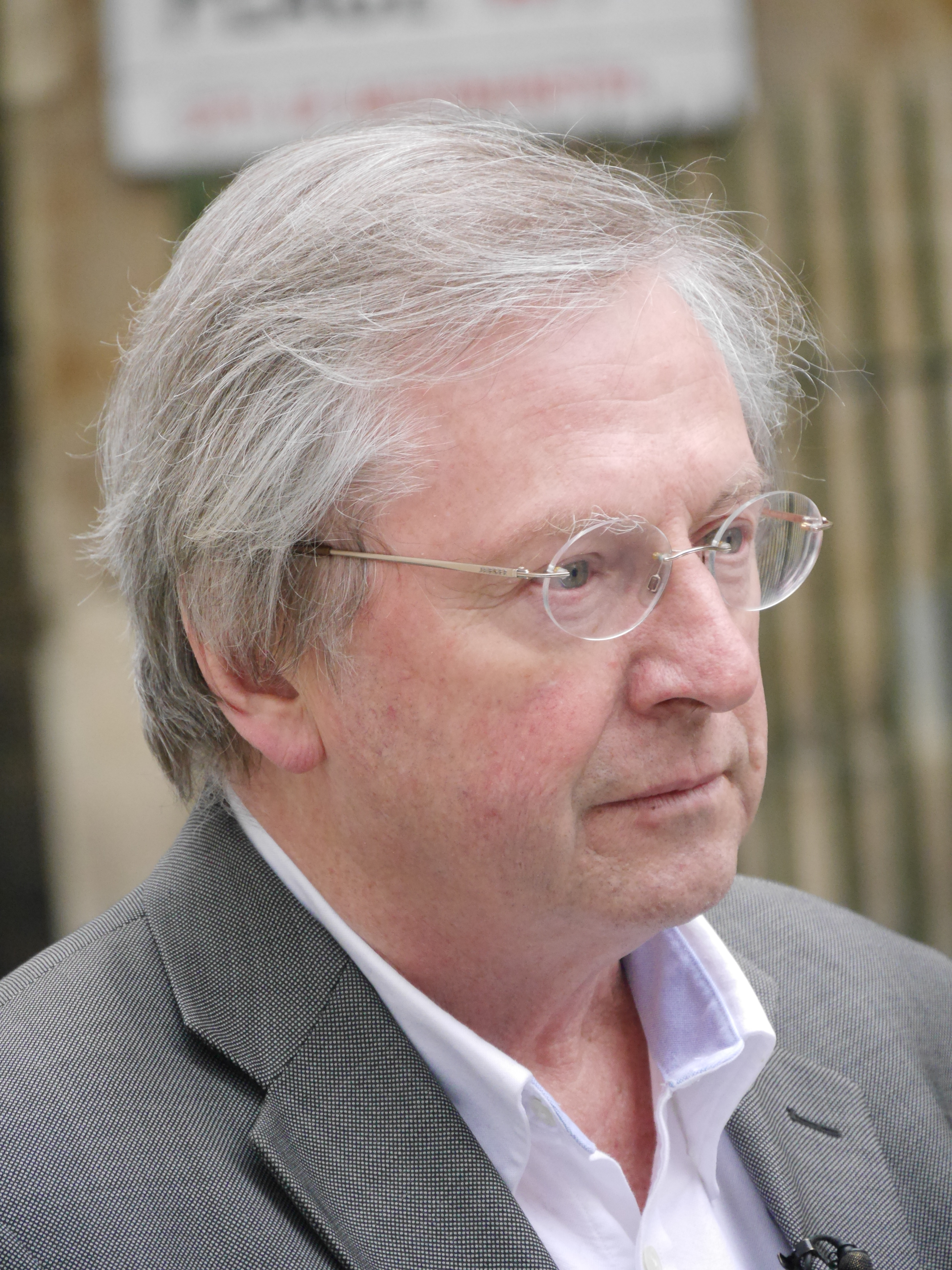
- Dalgleish in 2016
- Born: May 1950 (age 76); Harrow, London, England
- Education: University College London
- Employer: St George's, University of London
- Known for: HIV/AIDS research
- Political party: UK Independence Party (UKIP)
- Website: www.sgul.ac.uk/profiles/gus-dalgleish

Angus George Dalgleish (born May 1950) is a professor of oncology at St George's, University of London, best known for his contributions to HIV/AIDS research. Dalgleish stood in 2015 for Parliament as a UKIP candidate.

== Education ==
Angus George Dalgleish was born in May 1950 in Harrow, London. Initially educated at the Harrow County School for Boys, Dalgleish received a Bachelor of Medicine, Bachelor of Surgery degree from University College London with an intercalated bachelor's degree in Anatomy.

== Career as medical researcher ==
After various positions in the United Kingdom, Dalgleish joined the Royal Flying Doctor Service in Mount Isa, Queensland, then progressed through positions at various hospitals in Brisbane, Australia, before moving to the Ludwig Institute for Cancer Research in Sydney.

After completion of his training, Dalgleish returned to work in the UK in 1984 at the Institute of Cancer Research. He is a co-discoverer of the CD4 receptor as the major cellular receptor for HIV. In 1986, he was appointed to a consulting position at Northwick Park Hospital, in 1991 he was made Foundation Professor of Oncology at St George's, University of London, and in 1994 he was appointed Visiting Professor at the Institute of Cancer Research in London.

In 1997, he founded Onyvax Ltd., a privately funded biotechnology company developing cancer vaccines, where he held the position as Research Director; it was dissolved in 2013. Dalgleish is a member of the medical board in Bionor Pharma. Dalgleish is on the scientific advisory board of Immodulon, and has stock options in Immunor AS, a disclosure he made in order to have his research work published.

During the COVID-19 pandemic, Dalgleish was a proponent of the lab leak theory. While still not generally accepted, this remains a live debate, and it has been claimed that the support of Jay Bhattacharya and John Ratcliffe for the lab leak theory will bring "explosive documents" to light in 2025.

== 2015 candidacy for Parliament ==
Dalgleish was a member of the UK Independence Party and stood as a candidate in Sutton & Cheam, during the 2015 United Kingdom general election finishing fourth with 10.7% of the vote. Dalgleish campaigned for Leave.EU and appeared on the BBC Radio 4 Today programme presenting the case for Brexit. He was an advocate of Leave Means Leave, a Eurosceptic group.

== Awards and honours ==
Dalgleish was elected a Fellow of the Academy of Medical Sciences in 2001 and is also a Fellow of the Royal College of Physicians the Royal College of Pathologists and a Fellow of the Royal Australasian College of Physicians. His citation on election to FMedSci reads:

Professor Angus Dalgleish is Professor of Oncology at St Georges Hospital Medical School London. He has made seminal observations relating to the virology of HIV. In particular he identified CD4 as a major receptive for HIV in humans, produced the first report of a link between Slim Disease in Africa and HIV infection. He also identified the close correlation between the immune response and the presence of tropical spastic paraparesis in patients infected with the HTLV-1 virus.

== Covid controversies ==
In October 2023, following a joint investigation analysing emails leaked in 2022 by Russian hacking group working for the Russian FSB, an article was published by Computer Weekly and Byline Times containing several controversial claims about Angus Dalgleish.

- That Dalgleish was a member of a secret group led by Richard Dearlove (former head of MI6), Gwythian Prins (a historian academic), and John Constable (of the Global Warming Policy Foundation) - who called themselves the "Covid Hunters".
- That in March 2020 the group prepared an 'Urgent Briefing for the Prime Minister and his Advisers' which advised that COVID-19 originated in the Wuhan Institute of Virology (see COVID-19 lab leak ).
- That the group had briefed Boris Johnson that the man-made nature of the virus meant that the best candidate for vaccine development was the Norwegian Biovacc-19. Also that Dalgleish had been given stock options in the company Immunor which held the patents for this vaccine due to his significant involvement in the research behind its development.
- That when the scientific journal Nature Medicine published an article contradicting them on the origin of COVID-19, the group considered this to be COVID-19 misinformation by China.
- That following these suspicions the group had advised Michael Gove to secretly start electronic surveillance on the journal using MI5 resources to uncover them as part of a “China Persons of Influence Network” of senior officials, politicians and academics allegedly under the influence of the communist state. (For examples, see Chinese information operations and information warfare and Chinese espionage in the United States.)
- That the group had then contacted a range of other Western intelligence agencies to brief them on the supposed Chinese activity in a briefing titled 'The Three Interlocking Arms of The Intelligence Case against PRC' which claimed China was “attempting to control the terms of the origin of COVID-19 debate with active help from non-Chinese agents of influence, notably at the scientific journal Nature.
- That the group had worked together previously to replace Theresa May with Boris Johnson and had previously attempted to replace the National Security Council.

In November 2024, Dalgleish was interviewed in Australia on 2GB and repeated his views on the COVID-19 pandemic. He believed the lockdowns and mask mandates in many countries had been "total madness" and that the "vaccines" were wrongly named and had been "largely ineffective at saving lives" while causing many adverse reactions. Australia's pandemic response had been "absolutely appalling". Only Sweden had got it right, with no lockdown mandates, and with vaccines only for people over 70. He said the result had been "the lowest excess death rate in the entire western world." However this claim has been invalidated by multiple data sources that show Sweden was not exceptional in its covid death rates and had a similar outcome to many other EU countries including Ireland and Finland, both which had lockdowns and vaccines.

In a speech to the Reform Party Conference in September 2025 Aseem Malholtra, an adviser to US health secretary Robert F Kennedy Jr, said: "One of Britain's most eminent oncologists Professor Angus Dalgleish said to me to share with you today that he thinks it's highly likely that the Covid vaccines have been a significant factor in the cancers in the royal family."

== Publications and contributions ==
According to Semantic Scholar, Dalgleish has 495 publications, 21,234 citations, and 541 "highly influential citations".

- Smith PL; Piadel K; Dalgleish AG (25 November 2021). "Directing T-Cell Immune Responses for Cancer Vaccination and Immunotherapy". Vaccines. 9 (12). Basel: 1392. doi:10.3390/vaccines9121392. PMC 8708201. article number 1392. "in Special Issue Cancer Immunotherapy and Vaccines Research"
- Sørensen, B; Susrud, A; Dalgleish, AG (2 June 2020). "Biovacc-19: A Candidate Vaccine for Covid-19 (SARS-CoV-2) Developed from Analysis of its General Method of Action for Infectivity". QRB Discovery. 1 e6. doi:10.1017/qrd.2020.8. PMC 7468800.

== Bibliography ==
- Barnard, Paolo; Quay, Steven; Dalgleish, Angus (2021). The Origin of the Virus: The hidden truths behind the microbe that killed millions of people. Clinical Press Ltd. ISBN 978-1-85-457107-6.
- Goddard, Paul; Dalgleish, Angus (2023). The Death of Science: The retreat from reason in the post-modern world. Clinical Press Ltd. ISBN 978-1-85-4571137.
