= Paul Scully =

British politician (born 1968)

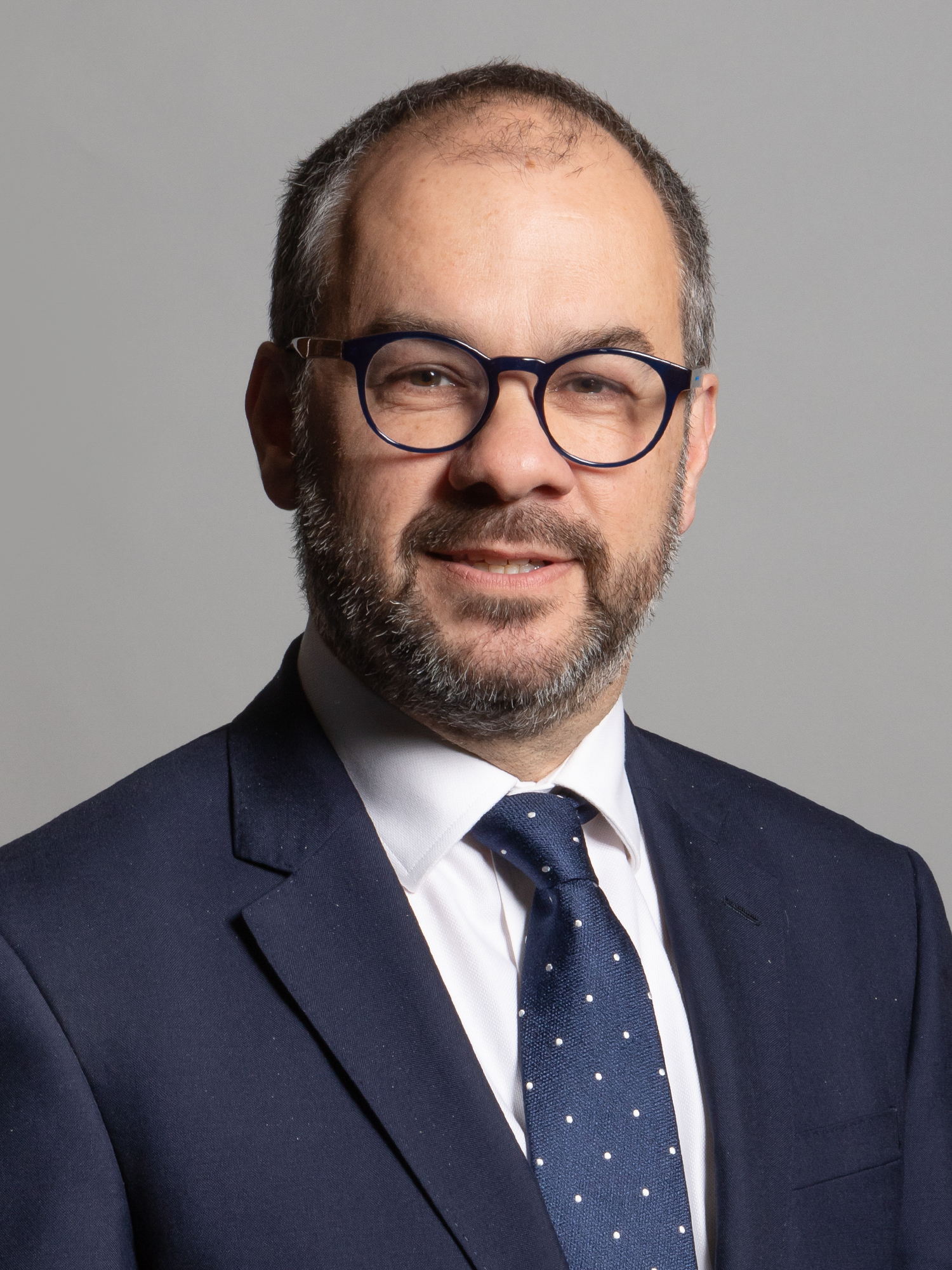
- Official portrait, 2020

Minister for London
- In office 13 February 2020 – 13 November 2023
- Prime Minister: Boris Johnson; Liz Truss; Rishi Sunak
- Preceded by: Chris Philp
- Succeeded by: Greg Hands

Parliamentary Under-Secretary of State for Tech and the Digital Economy
- In office 27 October 2022 – 13 November 2023
- Prime Minister: Rishi Sunak
- Preceded by: Damian Collins
- Succeeded by: Saqib Bhatti

Minister of State for Local Government and Building Safety
- In office 8 July 2022 – 27 October 2022
- Prime Minister: Boris Johnson; Liz Truss
- Preceded by: Kemi Badenoch
- Succeeded by: Lee Rowley

Parliamentary Under-Secretary of State for Small Business, Consumers and Labour Markets
- In office 13 February 2020 – 8 July 2022
- Prime Minister: Boris Johnson
- Preceded by: Kelly Tolhurst
- Succeeded by: Jane Hunt

Deputy Chairman of the Conservative Party
- In office 26 July 2019 – 13 February 2020
- Leader: Boris Johnson
- Preceded by: Helen Whately
- Succeeded by: Ranil Jayawardena

Member of Parliament for Sutton and Cheam
- In office 7 May 2015 – 30 May 2024
- Preceded by: Paul Burstow
- Succeeded by: Luke Taylor

Member of Sutton London Borough Council for Carshalton Central
- In office May 2006 – May 2010

Personal details
- Born: Paul Stuart Scully; 29 April 1968 (age 58) Rugby, Warwickshire, England
- Party: Conservative (since 1997)
- Education: University of Reading
- Website: www.scully.org.uk

Paul Stuart Scully (born 29 April 1968) is a former British politician who served as the Member of Parliament (MP) for Sutton and Cheam from 2015 to 2024. A member of the Conservative Party, he served as Minister for London from February 2020 and Parliamentary Under-Secretary of State for Tech and the Digital Economy from October 2022. He was sacked in both roles at the reshuffle in November 2023.

Scully served as vice-chairman of the Conservative Party for the London region from 2017 to 2019, having been appointed by Theresa May to replace Stephen Hammond who had the Conservative whip withdrawn for rebelling against the government over the EU withdrawal bill. After Boris Johnson was appointed prime minister in July 2019, Scully was promoted to Deputy Chairman of the Conservative Party. He was appointed Parliamentary Under-Secretary of State for Small Business, Consumers and Labour Markets and Minister for London in the February 2020 reshuffle. In July 2022, he became Minister of State at the Department for Levelling Up, Housing and Communities.

In May 2023, Scully announced he would "pause" his ministerial role to seek the Conservative Party's nomination in the 2024 London mayoral election, but failed to even make the shortlist.

== Early life ==
Scully was born in Rugby on 29 April 1968. His father's family was originally from Burma. He was privately educated at Bedford School. He later studied at the University of Reading. He moved to London after graduating and ran a number of small businesses. Scully joined the Conservative Party after the 1997 general election, and had previously voted for the Referendum Party.

== Political career ==
=== Local government ===
Scully unsuccessfully stood as a Conservative candidate in the Wallington South ward of the London Borough of Sutton Council elections in 2002, but was subsequently elected in the Carshalton Central ward in 2006. He was the Leader of the Opposition on Sutton Council for three of his four years as a councillor. Scully lost his seat to the Liberal Democrats at the following local election in 2010.

In addition to his work as a local councillor, Scully worked as a parliamentary aide for Conservative MPs Andrew Pelling, Shailesh Vara and Alok Sharma, and set up a public relations company called Nudge Factory Ltd in 2011.

=== Member of Parliament ===
Scully was selected as the Conservative Party candidate for the marginal Sutton and Cheam seat at the 2015 general election. The constituency is part of the borough in which he had been a councillor. Scully defeated the Liberal Democrat incumbent, Paul Burstow, who had represented the seat since 1997, and was elected as its Member of Parliament (MP). Scully was elected with 41.5% of the vote and a majority of 3,921.

In a parliamentary debate on 22 October 2015, Scully stated, "I am, I believe, the first Member of the British Parliament to be of Burmese heritage." He is reportedly "very proud" of his Burmese heritage.

He visited Myanmar for the first time in February 2016. He has been active in human rights issues in Burma, especially the Rohingya refugee situation and is the Co-Chair of the All-Party Parliamentary Group for Burma. He has written about his experience of being one of the first British MPs to visit the Kutupalong refugee camp during the 2017 mass movement.

In May 2016, it was reported that Scully was one of a number of Conservative MPs being investigated by police in the 2015 United Kingdom general election party spending investigation, for allegedly spending more than the legal limit on constituency election campaign expenses. In May 2017, the Crown Prosecution Service said that, while there was evidence of inaccurate spending returns, it did not "meet the test" for further action.

Scully campaigned for a Leave vote in the 2016 EU referendum, and was a supporter of the campaign group Leave Means Leave.

At the snap 2017 general election, Scully was re-elected with an increased vote share of 51.1% and a majority of 12,698.

In June 2017, comments made by Scully at an election hustings event and on a regional BBC politics programme relating to building a new hospital in Sutton were criticised by health campaigners as representing an acceptance of closing some existing local medical facilities, such as the St Helier Hospital. Scully said that he was still committed to retaining facilities at the St Helier Hospital, where he had previously volunteered.

In September 2017, he was appointed as the Prime Minister's Trade Envoy to Brunei, Thailand and Burma, and was the Parliamentary Private Secretary to Baroness Evans, the Leader of the House of Lords between November 2017 and January 2018.

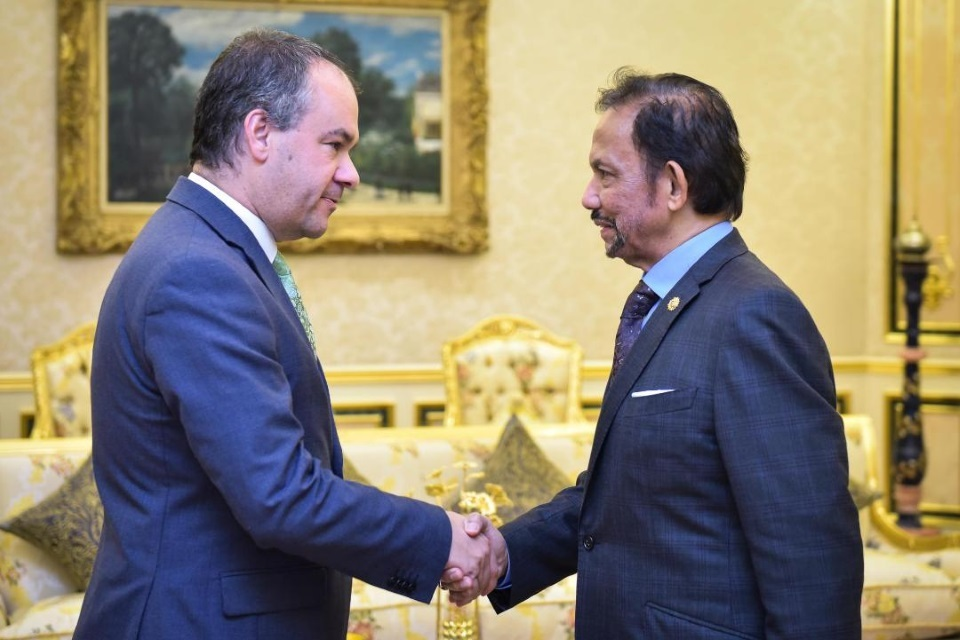
Scully as Trade Envoy meets the Sultan of Brunei Hassanal Bolkiah while on a trade visit to Brunei (November 2018)

On 15 December 2017, Scully was confirmed as the Conservative Party's new vice-chairman for London, following the sacking of Stephen Hammond two days earlier for his failure to vote with the Government on a key vote relating to the United Kingdom departing the European Union. He helped manage the Conservative Party's campaign in the 2018 London local elections, in which the party registered its lowest-ever number of seats in the capital, but made a number of gains on Sutton Council.

At the 2019 general election, Scully was again re-elected, with a decreased vote share of 50% and a decreased majority 8,351.

In February 2020, Scully joined the Department for Business, Energy and Industrial Strategy as the Parliamentary Under-Secretary of State for Small Business, Consumers and Labour Markets, succeeding Kelly Tolhurst. He was also appointed to the position of Minister for London, succeeding Chris Philp.

In July 2021, in response to a question about vaccine passports, Scully described himself as a libertarian conservative.

On 22 October 2021, Scully filibustered a bill which would outlaw the practice of sacking employees and hiring them back on worse terms and conditions, which resulted in the bill failing. Scully said that he did not disagree with the intent of the bill, but did not think it was the best means to achieve it. He said: "The unambiguous message is that bully-boy tactics of fire-and-rehire, for use as a negotiating tactic, is absolutely inappropriate."

On 7 July 2022, he was appointed a Minister at the Department for Levelling Up, Housing and Communities as part of the caretaker government by outgoing Prime Minister Johnson, succeeding Kemi Badenoch. Scully remained in this role and as Minister for London in the Truss ministry. In October 2022, under Prime Minister Rishi Sunak, Scully was appointed as Parliamentary Under-Secretary of State for Tech and the Digital Economy. He also remained in his post as Minister for London. He was removed from both ministerial roles in the November 2023 British cabinet reshuffle.

On 11 June 2023, Scully applied for, but failed to make the shortlist for the 2024 London mayoral election.

In February 2024, Scully was accused of Islamophobia after he made unsubstantiated claims about the existence of "no-go areas" in the London Borough of Tower Hamlets and the Sparkhill district of Birmingham, both of which have large Muslim populations. He subsequently apologised for the comments explaining the comments were blunt and detracted from the prejudice he was speaking out on.

In March 2024, Scully announced that he would not seek re-election as MP for Sutton and Cheam at the next general election.

== Business career ==
In April 2025, Scully joined the advisory board of DeepGreenX Group Inc., a technology company specialising in AI-driven digital finance and green infrastructure. His appointment was reviewed and approved by the UK government's Advisory Committee on Business Appointments (ACOBA), which imposed conditions to mitigate potential conflicts of interest, including restrictions on lobbying and the use of privileged information acquired during his ministerial tenure. In May 2025, DeepGreenX filed a registration statement with the U.S. Securities and Exchange Commission (SEC) as part of its plans to list American Depository Shares (ADSs) on the New York Stock Exchange, highlighting Scully's role as an advisory board member in the company’s strategic disclosures.

In October 2025, the company submitted a formal request to withdraw its planned public offering. In early 2026, a Hong Kong weekly magazine published an investigative report alleging that some former investors of the Hong Kong–based iFree Group had been encouraged to transfer their shareholdings to DeepGreenX in connection with a proposed overseas listing, raising concerns about investor protections and regulatory status. DeepGreenX denied the allegations, stating that it had no direct investment relationship with iFree Group and that the magazine’s report contained factual inaccuracies, adding that it had not been contacted for verification prior to publication.

== Personal life ==
Scully is divorced and has two grown-up children.

Parliament of the United Kingdom
Preceded by Paul Burstow	Member of Parliament for Sutton and Cheam; 2015–2024	Succeeded by Luke Taylor
Party political offices
Preceded by Helen Whately	Deputy Chairman of the Conservative Party; 2019–2020	Succeeded by Ranil Jayawardena
Political offices
Preceded by Chris Philp	Minister for London; 2020–2023	Succeeded by Greg Hands
Preceded by Kelly Tolhurst	Parliamentary Under-Secretary of State for Small Business, Consumers and Labour Markets; 2020–2022	Succeeded by Jane Hunt
Preceded by Kemi Badenoch	Minister of State for Local Government and Building Safety; 2022–2023	Succeeded by Saqib Bhatti
