= Pamela Sharples, Baroness Sharples =

British Conservative Party life peer (1923–2022)

The Right Honourable The Baroness Sharples
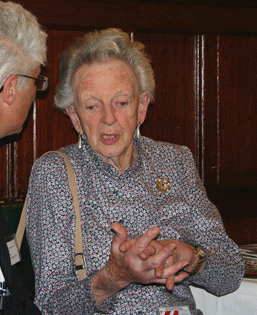
- Sharples in 2011

Member of the House of Lords
- Lord Temporal
- Life peerage 18 June 1973 – 18 December 2017

Personal details
- Born: Pamela Newall; 11 February 1923 England
- Died: 19 May 2022 (aged 99) England
- Party: Conservative
- Spouses: Sir Richard Sharples (m. 1946; died 1973) Patrick de László (m. 1977; died 1980) Robert Swan (m. 1983; died 1995)
- Children: 4

Military service
- Branch/service: Royal Air Force
- Years of service: 1941–1946
- Unit: Women's Auxiliary Air Force
- Battles/wars: Second World War

Pamela Sharples, Baroness Sharples (née Newall; 11 February 1923 – 19 May 2022) was a British life peer of the Conservative Party who was elevated to the peerage in 1973 after the assassination of her husband, Sir Richard Sharples, Governor of Bermuda.

== Early life and education ==
She was the daughter of Lt.-Cdr. Keith William Newall and wife Violet Ruby Ashton (who later married Lord Claud Hamilton, son of the 2nd Duke of Abercorn). She was educated at Southover Manor School in Lewes, East Sussex, and during the Second World War, from 1941 to 1946, she served in the Women's Auxiliary Air Force.

== Family ==
She was married three times. In 1946 she married Sir Richard Sharples, who was assassinated in 1973 while serving as Governor of Bermuda. They had two sons and two daughters. Her second husband, from 1977 until his death in 1980, was Patrick David de László (son of the painter Philip de László), and her third husband, from 1983 until his death in 1995, was Robert Douglas Swan.

== Political and business career ==
Sharples was created a life peer on 18 June 1973 following the assassination of her husband, becoming Baroness Sharples of Chawton in Hampshire. She sat in the House of Lords as a member of the Conservative Party.

In 1995 she became the sole owner of Nunswell Investments Limited, an offshore investment company in The Bahamas. In 2000 she became a director of Nunswell, which was registered in the United Kingdom the same year and, as of 2016, paid taxes to the British government. In April 2016 she was named in the Panama Papers, leaked documents related to offshore banking. Her law firm wrote that the House of Lords "has been notified of Baroness Sharples' oversight in registering her interest as a Director of Nunswell Investments Limited" and that she receives "no remuneration ... nor any income or capital from that company". As of December 2015, her son was a director and shareholder of the company, "not on a personal basis".

Sharples retired from the House of Lords on 18 December 2017. She died on 19 May 2022 at the age of 99.

== Arms ==
Coat of arms of Pamela Sharples, Baroness Sharples

Escutcheon
Argent a Chevron Vert between in chief two Copper Beech Trees eradicated and in base a White Tailed Tropicbird (phaethon lepturus) volant proper (for Sharples) on an Escutcheon of Pretence the Arms of Newall per saltire Argent and Gules a Crozier in fess Or between three Bustards wings elevated and addorsed counterchanged
Supporters
On either side a Great Dane Dog resting the interior hind foot proper on a Portcullis Or
