= Neil Macfarlane (politician) =

British politician (born 1936)

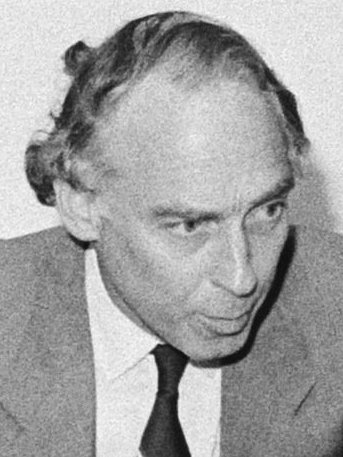
- Neil Macfarlane in 1985

Member of Parliament for Sutton and Cheam
- In office 28 February 1974 – 9 April 1992
- Preceded by: Graham Tope
- Succeeded by: Olga Maitland

Personal details
- Born: 7 May 1936 (age 89)
- Political party: Conservative

Sir David Neil Macfarlane (born 7 May 1936) is a Conservative Party politician in the United Kingdom.

== Political career ==
Macfarlane first stood for Parliament in 1970 at East Ham North, but was defeated by Labour's Reg Prentice. He was elected member of parliament for Sutton and Cheam in February 1974, regaining the seat from the Liberal Graham Tope who had beaten him in a by-election just 14 months earlier.

Macfarlane held some ministerial posts, including Education and Science and the Arts (1979–1981), and the Environment and Sport (1981–1985).

== After Parliament ==
Macfarlane stood down from Parliament in 1992, and was succeeded by Lady Olga Maitland. He wrote, with Michael Herd, a memoir of his time as sports minister, Sport and Politics: a world divided (Willow, 1986). He was knighted in the 1988 New Year Honours.

Parliament of the United Kingdom
Preceded by Graham Tope	Member of Parliament for Sutton and Cheam; February 1974–1992	Succeeded by Olga Maitland
Political offices
Preceded by Hector Monro	Minister for Sport; 1981–1985	Succeeded by Richard Tracey
