= John Montgomerie (chess player) =

Scottish chess player (1911–1995)

Personal information
- Born: 4 September 1911 Glasgow, Scotland
- Died: 21 July 1995 (aged 83)

Chess career
- Country: United Kingdom

John Montgomerie (4 September 1911 – 21 July 1995) was a Scottish chess player, Scottish Chess Championship silver medalist (1937).

== Biography ==
John Montgomerie graduated from Fettes College (Edinburgh) and Corpus Christi College, Oxford. He worked as barrister in the Bar Lincoln's Inn.

John Montgomerie was one of the strongest chess players in Scotland in the 1930s. He won silver medal in Scottish Chess Championship in 1936/1937 (tournament won William Fairhurst).

John Montgomerie played for Scotland in the Chess Olympiad:

- In 1937, at second board in the 7th Chess Olympiad in Stockholm (+1, =1, -14).

Soon after the 7th Chess Olympiad, in connection with employment at his main job, John Montgomerie left the practical chess game. He was engaged in a chess composition. In 1972, at the London-based publishing house Davis-Poynter, John Montgomerie published the book The Quiet Game, the proceeds of the sale of which were donated to the public organization Friends of Chess.
