= Graham Tope, Baron Tope =

British politician and life peer (born 1943)

The Right Honourable The Lord Tope CBE
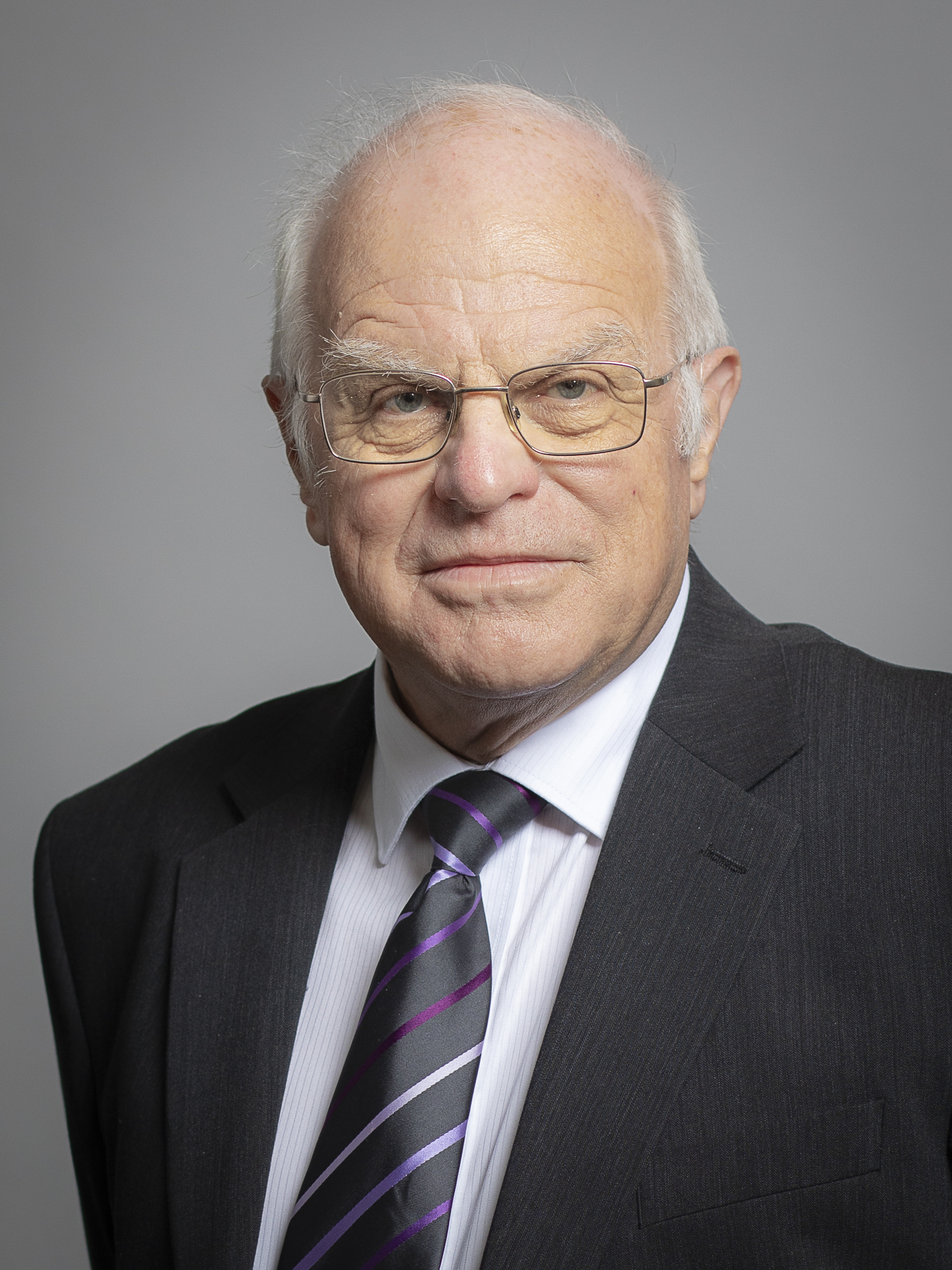
- Official portrait, 2020

Member of the House of Lords
- Lord Temporal
- Life peerage 4 October 1994

Member of the London Assembly as an additional member
- In office 4 May 2000 – 1 May 2008
- Preceded by: Assembly created
- Succeeded by: Caroline Pidgeon

Member of Parliament for Sutton and Cheam
- In office 7 December 1972 – 8 February 1974
- Preceded by: Richard Sharples
- Succeeded by: Neil Macfarlane

Personal details
- Born: Graham Norman Tope; 30 November 1943 (age 82)
- Party: Liberal Democrats (formerly Liberal Party, 1972–1988)

Graham Norman Tope, Baron Tope, CBE (born 30 November 1943) is a British politician and life peer. A member of the Liberal Democrats, he has served in both the House of Commons (1972–1974) and House of Lords (1994–present). Locally he was also a councillor on Sutton London Borough Council from 1974 to 2014 and elected to the London Assembly from 2000 to 2008.

== Career ==
In 1972, Tope captured the seat of Sutton and Cheam at a parliamentary by-election from the Conservatives for the Liberal Party. He became the first Liberal to represent the seat. The Conservatives retook it at the February 1974 general election. Tope contested the seat again in October 1974 without success.

In November 1973, Tope was made spokesperson for the Liberal Party on health, social security and Northern Ireland.

From 1974 to 2014 Tope was a councillor on Sutton London Borough Council. He was leader of the council from 1986 to 1999.

Having been appointed a Commander of the Order of the British Empire (CBE) in the 1991 Birthday Honours, Tope was created a life peer as Baron Tope, of Sutton in the London Borough of Sutton on 4 October 1994. He became the Liberal Democrats' spokesperson on education. He was a member of the European Committee of the Regions and is the only person to have served as a member of a European Institution, a member of the UK Parliament, a member of a regional government structure and as a borough councillor all at the same time.

At the London Assembly, he was leader of the Liberal Democrat Group until 2006, a member of the Audit Panel and member of the Transport Committee. He was also a member of the Metropolitan Police Authority, which oversees the Metropolitan Police. He retired after two terms at the 2008 London Assembly election.

Parliament of the United Kingdom
Preceded by Richard Sharples	Member of Parliament for Sutton and Cheam; 1972–February 1974	Succeeded by Neil Macfarlane
Orders of precedence in the United Kingdom
Preceded by The Lord Dubs	Gentlemen; Baron Tope	Followed by The Lord Hope of Craighead
